= List of songs recorded by Morrissey =

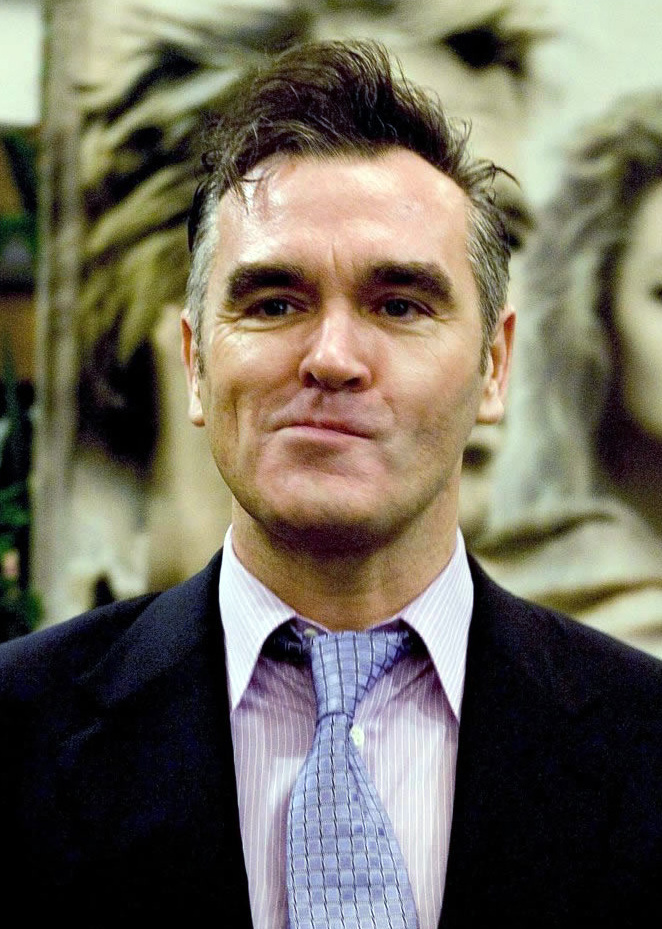
Morrissey in 2005.

A list of songs recorded by English musician Morrissey.

== List ==
Key
| ‡ | Indicates songs written by others |

Name of song, writer(s), original release, and year of release
| Song | Writer(s) | Original release | Year | Ref. |
|---|---|---|---|---|
| "Action Is My Middle Name" | Morrissey; Boz Boorer | Non-album single B-side to "The Last of the Famous International Playboys" (2013 reissue) | 2013 | |
| "All the Lazy Dykes" | Morrissey; Alain Whyte | You Are the Quarry | 2004 | |
| "All the Young People Must Fall in Love" | Morrissey; Boz Boorer | Low in High School | 2017 | |
| "All You Need Is Me" | Morrissey; Jesse Tobias | Years of Refusal | 2009 | |
| "Alma Matters" | Morrissey; Alain Whyte | Maladjusted | 1997 | |
| "Alsatian Cousin" | Morrissey; Stephen Street | Viva Hate | 1988 | |
| "Ambitious Outsiders" | Morrissey; Alain Whyte | Maladjusted | 1997 | |
| "America Is Not the World" | Morrissey; Alain Whyte | You Are the Quarry | 2004 | |
| "Ammunition" | Morrissey; Boz Boorer | Maladjusted | 1997 | |
| "Angel, Angel Down We Go Together" | Morrissey; Stephen Street | Viva Hate | 1988 | |
| "Art-hounds" | Morrissey; Boz Boorer | World Peace Is None of Your Business (Deluxe Edition) | 2014 | |
| "Asian Rut" | Morrissey; Mark E. Nevin | Kill Uncle | 1991 | |
| "At Amber" | Morrissey; Stephen Street | Non-album single B-side to "Piccadilly Palare" | 1990 | |
| "At Last I Am Born" | Morrissey; Michael Farrell | Ringleader of the Tormentors | 2006 | |
| "Back on the Chain Gang" | Chrissie Hynde ‡ | Low in High School (Édition Extrême De Luxe!) | 2018 | |
| "Because of My Poor Education" | Morrissey; Alain Whyte | Non-album single B-side to "I'm Throwing My Arms Around Paris" (CD #1) | 2009 | |
| "Bengali in Platforms" | Morrissey; Stephen Street | Viva Hate | 1988 | |
| "Best Friend on the Payroll" | Morrissey; Alain Whyte | Southpaw Grammar | 1995 | |
| "Billy Budd" | Morrissey; Alain Whyte | Vauxhall and I | 1994 | |
| "Black Cloud" | Morrissey; Boz Boorer | Years of Refusal | 2009 | |
| "Black-eyed Susan" | Morrissey; Alain Whyte | Non-album single B-side to "Sunny" | 1995 | |
| "Bobby, Don't You Think They Know?" | Morrissey; Gustavo Manzur | I Am Not a Dog on a Chain | 2020 | |
| "The Boy Racer" | Morrissey; Alain Whyte | Southpaw Grammar | 1995 | |
| "Break Up the Family" | Morrissey; Stephen Street | Viva Hate | 1988 | |
| "Brow of My Beloved" | Morrissey; Boz Boorer | Non-album single B-side to "Wedding Bell Blues" | 2019 | |
| "The Bullfighter Dies" | Morrissey; Jesse Tobias | World Peace Is None of Your Business | 2014 | |
| "Certain People I Know" | Morrissey; Alain Whyte | Your Arsenal | 1992 | |
| "Children in Pieces" | Morrissey; Jesse Tobias | Non-album single B-side to "All You Need Is Me" | 2009 | |
| "Christian Dior" | Morrissey; Boz Boorer | Non-album single B-side to "In the Future When All's Well" (7" single) | 2006 | |
| "Come Back to Camden" | Morrissey; Boz Boorer | You Are the Quarry | 2004 | |
| "Dagenham Dave" | Morrissey; Alain Whyte | Southpaw Grammar | 1995 | |
| "Darling, I Hug a Pillow" | Morrissey; Mando Lopez | I Am Not a Dog on a Chain | 2020 | |
| "Days of Decision" | Phil Ochs ‡ | California Son | 2019 | |
| "Dear God Please Help Me" | Morrissey; Alain Whyte | Ringleader of the Tormentors | 2006 | |
| "Dial-a-Cliche" | Morrissey; Stephen Street | Viva Hate | 1988 | |
| "Disappointed" | Morrissey; Stephen Street | Non-album single B-side to "Everyday Is Like Sunday" | 1988 | |
| "Do Your Best and Don't Worry" | Morrissey; Alain Whyte | Southpaw Grammar | 1995 | |
| "Don't Interrupt the Sorrow" | Joni Mitchell ‡ | California Son | 2019 | |
| "Don't Make Fun of Daddy's Voice" | Morrissey; Alain Whyte | Non-album single B-side to "Let Me Kiss You" (CD #1) | 2004 | |
| "Drag the River" | Morrissey; Boz Boorer | World Peace Is None of Your Business (Deluxe Edition) | 2014 | |
| "Driving Your Girlfriend Home" | Morrissey; Mark E. Nevin | Kill Uncle | 1991 | |
| "Earth Is the Loneliest Planet" | Morrissey; Gustavo Manzur | World Peace Is None of Your Business | 2014 | |
| "East, West" | Graham Gouldman ‡ | Non-album single B-side to "Ouija Board, Ouija Board" (12" vinyl) | 1989 | |
| "The Edges Are No Longer Parallel" | Morrissey; Alain Whyte | Non-album single B-side to "Roy's Keen" | 1997 | |
| "Everyday Is Like Sunday" | Morrissey; Stephen Street | Viva Hate | 1988 | |
| "Fantastic Bird" | Morrissey; Alain Whyte | Southpaw Grammar (2009 Expanded Edition) | 2009 | |
| "The Father Who Must Be Killed" | Morrissey; Alain Whyte | Ringleader of the Tormentors | 2006 | |
| "First of the Gang to Die" | Morrissey; Alain Whyte | You Are the Quarry | 2004 | |
| "Forgive Someone" | Morrissey; Boz Boorer | World Peace Is None of Your Business (Deluxe Edition) | 2014 | |
| "Found Found Found" | Morrissey; Clive Langer | Kill Uncle | 1991 | |
| "Friday Mourning" | Morrissey; Alain Whyte | Non-album single B-side to "Let Me Kiss You" (CD #2) | 2004 | |
| "Ganglord" | Morrissey; Alain Whyte | Non-album single B-side to "The Youngest Was the Most Loved" (Maxi single) | 2006 | |
| "Get Off the Stage" | Morrissey; Kevin Armstrong | Non-album single B-side to "Piccadilly Palare" (12" vinyl) | 1990 | |
| "The Girl from Tel-Aviv Who Wouldn't Kneel" | Morrissey; Gustavo Manzur | Low in High School | 2017 | |
| "Girl Least Likely To" | Morrissey; Andy Rourke | Non-album single B-side to "November Spawned a Monster" | 1990 | |
| "Glamorous Glue" | Morrissey; Alain Whyte | Your Arsenal | 1992 | |
| "Good Looking Man About Town" | Morrissey; Alain Whyte | Non-album single B-side to "You Have Killed Me" (CD #1) | 2006 | |
| "Hairdresser on Fire" | Morrissey; Stephen Street | Non-album single B-side to "Suedehead" (12" vinyl) | 1988 | |
| "Happy Lovers At Last United" | Morrissey; Stephen Street | Bona Drag (2010 Expanded Edition) | 2010 | |
| "The Harsh Truth of the Camera Eye" | Morrissey; Mark E. Nevin | Kill Uncle | 1991 | |
| "He Cried" | Morrissey; Alain Whyte | Maladjusted | 1997 | |
| "He Knows I'd Love to See Him" | Morrissey; Kevin Armstrong | Non-album single B-side to "November Spawned a Monster" | 1990 | |
| "Heir Apparent" | Morrissey; Alain Whyte | Non-album single B-side to "Alma Matters" | 1997 | |
| "Hold On to Your Friends" | Morrissey; Alain Whyte | Vauxhall and I | 1994 | |
| "Home Is a Question Mark" | Morrissey; Mando Lopez | Low in High School | 2017 | |
| "Honey, You Know Where to Find Me" | Morrissey; Boz Boorer | Southpaw Grammar (2009 Expanded Edition) | 2009 | |
| "How Can Anybody Possibly Know How I Feel?" | Morrissey; Alain Whyte | You Are the Quarry | 2004 | |
| "Human Being" | David Johansen; Johnny Thunders ‡ | Non-album single B-side to "You Have Killed Me" (CD #2) | 2006 | |
| "I Am Hated for Loving" | Morrissey; Alain Whyte | Vauxhall and I | 1994 | |
| "I Am Not a Dog on a Chain" | Morrissey; Jesse Tobias | I Am Not a Dog on a Chain | 2020 | |
| "I Am Two People" | Morrissey; Alain Whyte | Non-album single B-side to "Let Me Kiss You" (CD #2) | 2004 | |
| "I Bury the Living" | Morrissey; Jesse Tobias | Low in High School | 2017 | |
| "I Can Have Both" | Morrissey; Boz Boorer | Non-album single B-side to "Alma Matters" | 1997 | |
| "I Don't Mind If You Forget Me" | Morrissey; Stephen Street | Viva Hate | 1988 | |
| "I Have Forgiven Jesus" | Morrissey; Alain Whyte | You Are the Quarry | 2004 | |
| "I Just Want to See the Boy Happy" | Morrissey; Jesse Tobias | Ringleader of the Tormentors | 2006 | |
| "I Knew I Was Next" | Morrissey; Jesse Tobias | Non-album single B-side to "You Have Killed Me" (CD #2) | 2006 | |
| "I Know It's Gonna Happen Someday" | Morrissey; Mark E. Nevin | Your Arsenal | 1992 | |
| "I Know Very Well How I Got My Name" | Morrissey; Stephen Street | Non-album single B-side to "Suedehead" | 1988 | |
| "I Like You" | Morrissey; Boz Boorer | You Are the Quarry | 2004 | |
| "I Thought You Were Dead" | Morrissey; Jesse Tobias | Non-album single B-side to "Lover-to-Be" | 2018 | |
| "I Will See You in Far-Off Places" | Morrissey; Alain Whyte | Ringleader of the Tormentors | 2006 | |
| "I Wish You Lonely" | Morrissey; Boz Boorer | Low in High School | 2017 | |
| "I'd Love To" | Morrissey; Boz Boorer | Non-album single B-side to "The More You Ignore Me, the Closer I Get" | 1994 | |
| "I'll Never Be Anybody's Hero Now" | Morrissey; Alain Whyte | Ringleader of the Tormentors | 2006 | |
| "I'm Not Sorry" | Morrissey; Boz Boorer | You Are the Quarry | 2004 | |
| "I'm Not a Man" | Morrissey; Jesse Tobias | World Peace Is None of Your Business | 2014 | |
| "I'm OK by Myself" | Morrissey; Jesse Tobias | Years of Refusal | 2009 | |
| "(I'm) The End of the Family Line" | Morrissey; Mark E. Nevin | Kill Uncle | 1991 | |
| "I'm Throwing My Arms Around Paris" | Morrissey; Boz Boorer | Years of Refusal | 2009 | |
| "I've Changed My Plea to Guilty" | Morrissey; Mark E. Nevin | Non-album single B-side to "My Love Life" | 1991 | |
| "If You Don't Like Me, Don't Look at Me" | Morrissey; Jesse Tobias | Non-album single B-side to "The Youngest Was the Most Loved" (7" single) | 2006 | |
| "In the Future When All's Well" | Morrissey; Jesse Tobias | Ringleader of the Tormentors | 2006 | |
| "In Your Lap" | Morrissey; Gustavo Manzur | Low in High School | 2017 | |
| "Interesting Drug" | Morrissey; Stephen Street | Non-album single | 1989 | |
| "Interlude" (Duet with Siouxsie) | Georges Delerue; Hal Shaper ‡ | Non-album single | 1994 | |
| "Irish Blood, English Heart" | Morrissey; Alain Whyte | You Are the Quarry | 2004 | |
| "Israel" | Morrissey; Gustavo Manzur | Low in High School | 2017 | |
| "Istanbul" | Morrissey; Boz Boorer | World Peace Is None of Your Business | 2014 | |
| "It Happens Every Time" | Tim Buckley ‡ | Non-album single B-side to "It's Over" | 2019 | |
| "It's Hard to Walk Tall When You're Small" | Morrissey; Alain Whyte | Non-album single B-side to "Irish Blood, English Heart" (CD #1) | 2004 | |
| "It's Not Your Birthday Anymore" | Morrissey; Alain Whyte | Years of Refusal | 2009 | |
| "It's Over" | Roy Orbison; Bill Dees ‡ | California Son | 2019 | |
| "Jacky's Only Happy When She's Up on the Stage" | Morrissey; Boz Boorer | Low in High School | 2017 | |
| "Jim Jim Falls" | Morrissey; Jesse Tobias | I Am Not a Dog on a Chain | 2020 | |
| "Journalists Who Lie" | Morrissey; Mark E. Nevin | Non-album single B-side to "Our Frank" | 1991 | |
| "Julie in the Weeds" | Morrissey; Boz Boorer | World Peace Is None of Your Business (Deluxe Edition) | 2014 | |
| "Kick the Bride Down the Aisle" | Morrissey; Boz Boorer | World Peace Is None of Your Business | 2014 | |
| The Kid's a Looker | Morrissey; Boz Boorer | Non-album single B-side to "The Last of the Famous International Playboys" (2013 reissue) | 2013 | |
| "King Leer" | Morrissey; Mark E. Nevin | Kill Uncle | 1991 | |
| "Kiss Me a Lot" | Morrissey; Jesse Tobias | World Peace Is None of Your Business | 2014 | |
| "Knockabout World" | Morrissey; Jesse Tobias | I Am Not a Dog on a Chain | 2020 | |
| "Lady Willpower" | Jerry Fuller ‡ | California Son | 2019 | |
| "The Last of the Famous International Playboys" | Morrissey; Stephen Street | Non-album single | 1989 | |
| "Late Night, Maudlin Street" | Morrissey; Stephen Street | Viva Hate | 1988 | |
| "The Lazy Sunbathers" | Morrissey; Alain Whyte | Vauxhall and I | 1994 | |
| "Lenny's Tune" | Tim Hardin ‡ | California Son | 2019 | |
| "Let Me Kiss You" | Morrissey; Alain Whyte | You Are the Quarry | 2004 | |
| "Let the Right One Slip In" | Morrissey; Alain Whyte; Gary Day | Non-album single B-side to "Tomorrow" | 1992 | |
| "Life Is a Pigsty" | Morrissey; Alain Whyte | Ringleader of the Tormentors | 2006 | |
| "Lifeguard On Duty" | Morrissey; Stephen Street | Bona Drag (2010 Expanded Edition) | 2010 | |
| "Lifeguard Sleeping, Girl Drowning" | Morrissey; Boz Boorer | Vauxhall and I | 1994 | |
| "Little Man, What Now?" | Morrissey; Stephen Street | Viva Hate | 1988 | |
| "Loneliness Remembers What Happiness Forgets" | Burt Bacharach; Hal David ‡ | California Son | 2019 | |
| "The Loop" | Morrissey; Mark E. Nevin | Non-album single B-side to "Sing Your Life" (12" vinyl) | 1991 | |
| "Lost" | Morrissey; Spencer Cobrin | Non-album single B-side to "Roy's Keen" | 1997 | |
| "Love Is on Its Way Out" | Morrissey; Gustavo Manzur | I Am Not a Dog on a Chain | 2020 | |
| "Lover-to-Be" | Morrissey; Boz Boorer | Low in High School (Édition Extrême De Luxe!) | 2018 | |
| "Lucky Lisp" | Morrissey; Stephen Street | Non-album single B-side to "The Last of the Famous International Playboys" | 1989 | |
| "Maladjusted" | Morrissey; Boz Boorer | Maladjusted | 1997 | |
| "Mama Lay Softly on the Riverbed" | Morrissey; Alain Whyte | Years of Refusal | 2009 | |
| "Margaret on the Guillotine" | Morrissey; Stephen Street | Viva Hate | 1988 | |
| "Mexico" | Morrissey; Alain Whyte; Gary Day | Non-album single B-side to "First of the Gang to Die" (12" vinyl) | 2004 | |
| "Michael's Bones" | Morrissey; Stephen Street | Non-album single B-side to "The Last of the Famous International Playboys" | 1989 | |
| "Moon River" | Johnny Mercer; Henry Mancini ‡ | Non-album single B-side to "Hold On to Your Friends" | 1994 | |
| "The More You Ignore Me, the Closer I Get" | Morrissey; Boz Boorer | Vauxhall and I | 1994 | |
| "Morning Starship" | Jobriath ‡ | California Son | 2019 | |
| "Mountjoy" | Morrissey; Boz Boorer | World Peace Is None of Your Business | 2014 | |
| "Munich Air Disaster 1958" | Morrissey; Alain Whyte | Non-album single B-side to "Irish Blood, English Heart" (CD #2) | 2004 | |
| "Mute Witness" | Morrissey; Clive Langer | Kill Uncle | 1991 | |
| "My Hurling Days Are Done" | Morrissey; Jesse Tobias | I Am Not a Dog on a Chain | 2020 | |
| "My Life Is a Succession of People Saying Goodbye" | Morrissey; Alain Whyte | Non-album single B-side to "First of the Gang to Die" (CD #1) | 2004 | |
| "My Love, I'd Do Anything for You" | Morrissey; Mando Lopez | Low in High School | 2017 | |
| "The National Front Disco" | Morrissey; Alain Whyte | Your Arsenal | 1992 | |
| "Neal Cassady Drops Dead" | Morrissey; Gustavo Manzur | World Peace Is None of Your Business | 2014 | |
| "Never Again Will I Be a Twin" | Morrissey; Mando Lopez | Low in High School (Édition Extrême De Luxe!) | 2018 | |
| "The Never Played Symphonies" | Morrissey; Alain Whyte | Non-album single B-side to "Irish Blood, English Heart" (CD #2) | 2004 | |
| "No One Can Hold a Candle to You" | James Maker; Phil Huish ‡ | Non-album single B-side to "I Have Forgiven Jesus" (CD #1) | 2004 | |
| "Nobody Loves Us" | Morrissey; Alain Whyte | Non-album single B-side to "Dagenham Dave" | 1995 | |
| "Noise Is the Best Revenge" | Morrissey; Boz Boorer; Gary Day | Non-album single B-side to "There Is a Light That Never Goes Out/Redondo Beach" | 2005 | |
| "November Spawned a Monster" | Morrissey; Clive Langer | Non-album single | 1990 | |
| "Now I Am a Was" | Morrissey; Spencer Cobrin | Non-album single B-side to "Satan Rejected My Soul" | 1997 | |
| "Now My Heart Is Full" | Morrissey; Boz Boorer | Vauxhall and I | 1994 | |
| "Oboe Concerto" | Morrissey; Boz Boorer | World Peace Is None of Your Business | 2014 | |
| "Oh Phoney" | Morrissey; Kevin Armstrong | Bona Drag (2010 Expanded Edition) | 2010 | |
| "Oh Well, I'll Never Learn" | Morrissey; Stephen Street | Non-album single B-side to "Suedehead" (CD and cassette) | 1988 | |
| "On the Streets I Ran" | Morrissey; Jesse Tobias | Ringleader of the Tormentors | 2006 | |
| "Once I Saw the River Clean" | Morrissey; Jesse Tobias | I Am Not a Dog on a Chain | 2020 | |
| "One Day Goodbye Will Be Farewell" | Morrissey; Boz Boorer | Years of Refusal | 2009 | |
| "One of Our Own" | Morrissey; Gustavo Manzur | World Peace Is None of Your Business (Deluxe Edition) | 2014 | |
| "Only a Pawn in Their Game" | Bob Dylan ‡ | California Son | 2019 | |
| "The Operation" | Morrissey; Alain Whyte | Southpaw Grammar | 1995 | |
| "The Ordinary Boys" | Morrissey; Stephen Street | Viva Hate | 1988 | |
| "Ouija Board, Ouija Board" | Morrissey; Stephen Street | Non-album single | 1989 | |
| "Our Frank" | Morrissey; Mark E. Nevin | Kill Uncle | 1991 | |
| "Papa Jack" | Morrissey; Alain Whyte | Maladjusted | 1997 | |
| "Pashernate Love" | Morrissey; Alain Whyte; Gary Day | Non-album single B-side to "You're the One for Me, Fatty" | 1992 | |
| "People Are the Same Everywhere" | Morrissey; Jesse Tobias | Non-album single B-side to "The Last of the Famous International Playboys" (2013 reissue) | 2013 | |
| "Piccadilly Palare" | Morrissey; Kevin Armstrong | Non-album single | 1990 | |
| "Please Help the Cause Against Loneliness" | Morrissey; Stephen Street | Bona Drag (2010 Expanded Edition) | 2010 | |
| "The Public Image" | Morrissey; Alain Whyte | Non-album single B-side to "I Have Forgiven Jesus" (CD #2) | 2004 | |
| "Reader Meet Author" | Morrissey; Boz Boorer | Southpaw Grammar | 1995 | |
| "Roy's Keen" | Morrissey; Alain Whyte | Maladjusted | 1997 | |
| "Safe, Warm Lancashire Home" | Morrissey; Stephen Street | Non-album single B-side to "Glamorous Glue" (2011 reissue) | 2011 | |
| "Satan Rejected My Soul" | Morrissey; Boz Boorer | Maladjusted | 1997 | |
| "Scandinavia" | Morrissey; Boz Boorer | World Peace Is None of Your Business (Deluxe Edition) | 2014 | |
| "Seasick, Yet Still Docked" | Morrissey; Alain Whyte | Your Arsenal | 1992 | |
| "The Secret of Music" | Morrissey; Mando Lopez | I Am Not a Dog on a Chain | 2020 | |
| "Shame Is the Name" | Morrissey; Alain Whyte | Non-album single B-side to "I'm Throwing My Arms Around Paris" (CD #2) | 2009 | |
| "Sing Your Life" | Morrissey; Mark E. Nevin | Kill Uncle | 1991 | |
| "Sister I'm a Poet" | Morrissey; Stephen Street | Non-album single B-side to "Everyday Is Like Sunday" | 1988 | |
| "The Slum Mums" | Morrissey; Alain Whyte | Non-album single B-side to "I Have Forgiven Jesus" (CD #2) | 2004 | |
| "Smiler with Knife" | Morrissey; Boz Boorer | World Peace Is None of Your Business | 2014 | |
| "Some Say I Got Devil" | Melanie Safka ‡ | California Son | 2019 | |
| "Something Is Squeezing My Skull" | Morrissey; Alain Whyte | Years of Refusal | 2009 | |
| "A Song from Under the Floorboards" | Barry Adamson; Howard Devoto; Dave Formula; John McGeoch‡ | Non-album single B-side to "The Youngest Was the Most Loved" (Maxi single) | 2006 | |
| "Sorrow Will Come in the End" | Morrissey; Alain Whyte | Maladjusted | 1997 | |
| "Sorry Doesn't Help" | Morrissey; Jesse Tobias | Years of Refusal | 2009 | |
| "Southpaw" | Morrissey; Alain Whyte | Southpaw Grammar | 1995 | |
| "Speedway" | Morrissey; Boz Boorer | Vauxhall and I | 1994 | |
| "Spent the Day in Bed" | Morrissey; Gustavo Manzur | Low in High School | 2017 | |
| "Spring-Heeled Jim" | Morrissey; Boz Boorer | Vauxhall and I | 1994 | |
| "Staircase at the University" | Morrissey; Boz Boorer | World Peace Is None of Your Business | 2014 | |
| "Suedehead" | Morrissey; Stephen Street | Viva Hate | 1988 | |
| "Such a Little Thing Makes Such a Big Difference" | Morrissey; Stephen Street | Non-album single B-side to "Interesting Drug" | 1989 | |
| "Suffer the Little Children" | Buffy Sainte-Marie ‡ | California Son | 2019 | |
| "Sunny" | Morrissey; Alain Whyte | Non-album single | 1995 | |
| "A Swallow On My Neck" | Morrissey; Alain Whyte | Non-album single B-side to "Sunny" | 1995 | |
| "Sweetie-Pie" | Morrissey; Michael Farrell | Non-album single B-side to "I Just Want to See the Boy Happy" (CD) | 2006 | |
| "The Teachers Are Afraid of the Pupils" | Morrissey; Boz Boorer | Southpaw Grammar | 1995 | |
| "Teenage Dad on His Estate" | Morrissey; Alain Whyte | Non-album single B-side to "First of the Gang to Die" (12" vinyl) | 2004 | |
| "That's Entertainment" | Paul Weller ‡ | Non-album single B-side to "Sing Your Life" | 1991 | |
| "That's How People Grow Up" | Morrissey; Boz Boorer | Years of Refusal | 2009 | |
| "There Speaks a True Friend" | Morrissey; Alain Whyte | Non-album single B-side to "Tomorrow" (12" single) | 1992 | |
| "There's a Place in Hell for Me and My Friends" | Morrissey; Mark E. Nevin | Kill Uncle | 1991 | |
| "This Is Not Your Country" | Morrissey; Alain Whyte | Non-album single B-side to "Satan Rejected My Soul" | 1997 | |
| "This Song Doesn't End When It's Over" | Morrissey; Boz Boorer | Low in High School (Édition Extrême De Luxe!) | 2018 | |
| "To Me You Are a Work of Art" | Morrissey; Alain Whyte | Ringleader of the Tormentors | 2006 | |
| "Tomorrow" | Morrissey; Alain Whyte | Your Arsenal | 1992 | |
| "Tony the Pony" | Morrissey; Mark E. Nevin | Non-album single B-side to "Our Frank" (12" vinyl) | 1991 | |
| "Treat Me Like a Human Being" | Morrissey; Stephen Street | Viva Hate (2012 Remastered Special Edition) | 2012 | |
| "Trouble Loves Me" | Morrissey; Alain Whyte | Maladjusted | 1997 | |
| "The Truth About Ruth" | Morrissey; Gustavo Manzur | I Am Not a Dog on a Chain | 2020 | |
| "Used to Be a Sweet Boy" | Morrissey; Alain Whyte | Vauxhall and I | 1994 | |
| "We Hate It When Our Friends Become Successful" | Morrissey; Alain Whyte | Your Arsenal | 1992 | |
| "We'll Let You Know" | Morrissey; Alain Whyte | Your Arsenal | 1992 | |
| "Wedding Bell Blues" | Laura Nyro ‡ | California Son | 2019 | |
| "What Kind of People Live in These Houses?" | Morrissey; Jesse Tobias | I Am Not a Dog on a Chain | 2020 | |
| "When Last I Spoke to Carol" | Morrissey; Alain Whyte | Years of Refusal | 2009 | |
| "When You Close Your Eyes" | Carly Simon; Billy Mernit ‡ | California Son | 2019 | |
| "When You Open Your Legs" | Morrissey; Boz Boorer | Low in High School | 2017 | |
| "Why Don't You Find Out for Yourself" | Morrissey; Alain Whyte | Vauxhall and I | 1994 | |
| "Wide to Receive" | Morrissey; Spencer Cobrin | Maladjusted | 1997 | |
| "Will Never Marry" | Morrissey; Stephen Street | Non-album single B-side to "Everyday Is Like Sunday" | 1988 | |
| "The World Is Full of Crashing Bores" | Morrissey; Boz Boorer | You Are the Quarry | 2004 | |
| "World Peace Is None of Your Business" | Morrissey; Boz Boorer | World Peace Is None of Your Business | 2014 | |
| "Yes, I Am Blind" | Morrissey; Andy Rourke | Non-album single B-side to "Ouija Board, Ouija Board" | 1989 | |
| "You Have Killed Me" | Morrissey; Jesse Tobias | Ringleader of the Tormentors | 2006 | |
| "You Know I Couldn't Last" | Morrissey; Alain Whyte; Gary Day | You Are the Quarry | 2004 | |
| "You Must Please Remember" | Morrissey; Alain Whyte | Non-album single B-side to "Dagenham Dave" (CD single) | 1995 | |
| "You Should Have Been Nice to Me" | Morrissey; Boz Boorer | Southpaw Grammar (2009 Expanded Edition) | 2009 | |
| "You Were Good in Your Time" | Morrissey; Alain Whyte | Years of Refusal | 2009 | |
| "You're Gonna Need Someone on Your Side" | Morrissey; Mark E. Nevin | Your Arsenal | 1992 | |
| "You're the One for Me, Fatty" | Morrissey; Alain Whyte | Your Arsenal | 1992 | |
| "The Youngest Was the Most Loved" | Morrissey; Jesse Tobias | Ringleader of the Tormentors | 2006 | |
