= List of Morrissey band members =

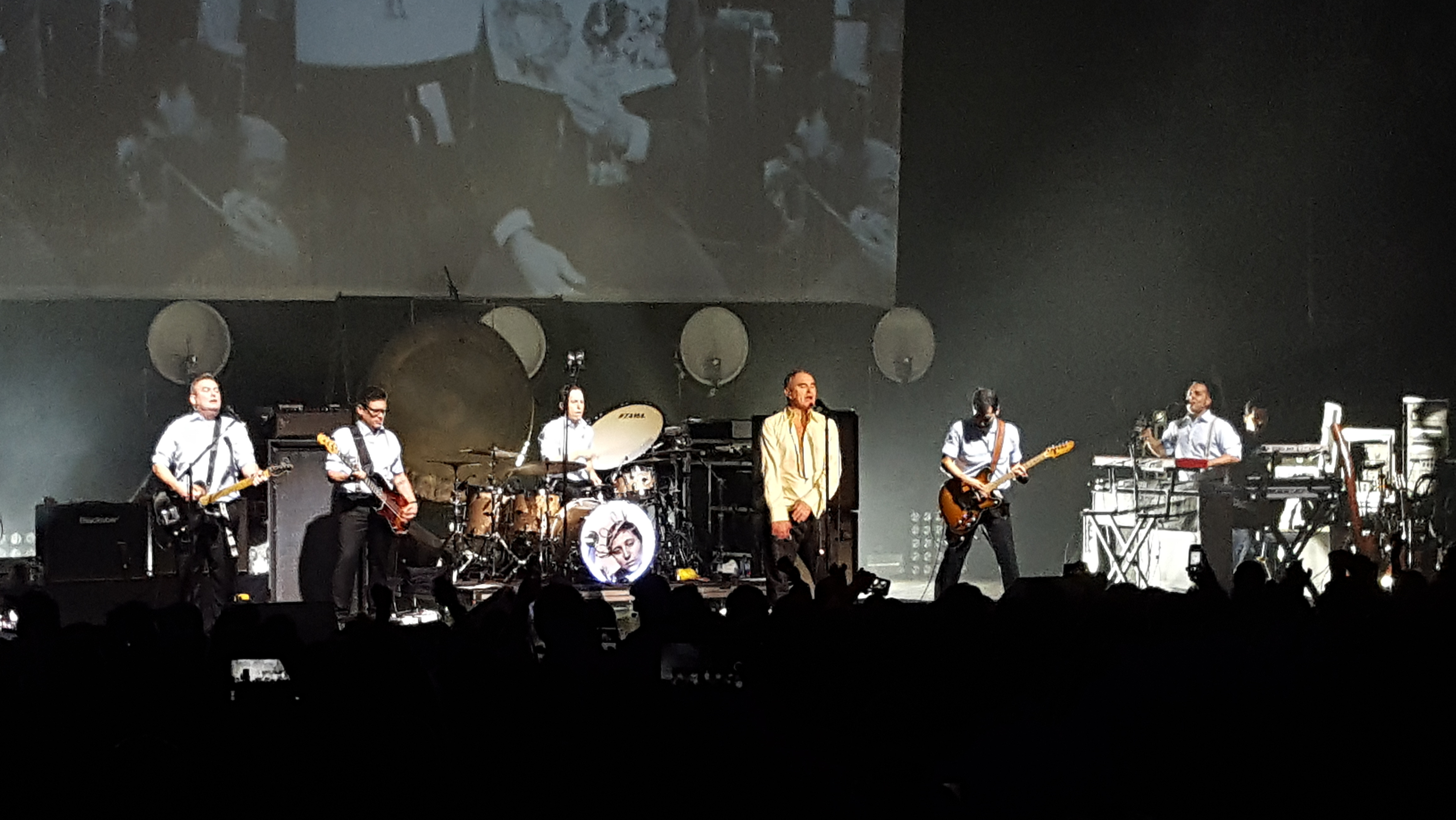
Morrissey and band performing in 2016

Morrissey is an English singer and songwriter who, since the break-up of the Smiths, has worked with several musicians throughout his career as a solo artist. His current touring band consists of guitarist Jesse Tobias (since 2005), drummer Matt Walker (since 2021), bassist Juan Galeano (since 2022), keyboardist Camila Grey and guitarist Carmen Vandenberg (both since 2023)

== History ==
Several months after the Smiths broke up in 1988, Morrissey enlisted Smiths producer Stephen Street to help begin his solo career. His debut album Viva Hate (1988) featured Street on bass and guitar, Vini Reilly on guitar and keyboards and Andrew Paresi on drums. His first solo performance happened on 22 December of the same year, at which he was backed by former Smiths bandmates, Craig Gannon (guitar), Andy Rourke (bass) and Mike Joyce (drums). The three continued to play on Morrissey's singles until 1989 and 1990.

Morrissey hired a new band from 1991's Kill Uncle, consisting of Mark E. Nevin (guitar), Mark Bedford (bass), Andrew Paresi (drums, percussion), Seamus Beaghen and Steven Heart (keyboards), Nawazish Ali Khan (violin) and Linder Sterling (backing vocals). For live performances in the same year he was joined by guitarists Boz Boorer and Alain Whyte, bassist Gary Day and drummer Spencer Cobrin. Day and Cobrin were replaced by Jonny Bridgwood (who Day had originally replaced) and Woodie Taylor in 1993. Spencer Cobrin returned in 1995.

In 1999, Day returned alongside new drummer Spike T. Smith. Dean Butterworth replaced Smith in 2003, joining alongside keyboardist Roger Joseph Manning Jr. Manning was replaced by Michael Farrell in 2004. Guitarist Jesse Tobias also joined in 2005. Matt Chamberlain replaced Butterworth in 2005. Day was also replaced by Solomon Walker in 2007, who brought in his brother, Matt Walker on drums.

Manning returned in 2008 and Whyte left in 2009. Gustavo Manzur also replaced Manning in 2009, as well as Mando Lopez replacing Solomon Walker on bass. Solomon returned in 2021, alongside Whyte and new drummer Brendan Buckley, replacing Lopez, Boorer and Matt Walker respectively. Juan Galeano replaced Walker in 2022. Camila Grey replaced Manzur in 2023, as well as Carmen Vandenberg replacing Whyte. Matt Walker returned in 2024, with Solomon Walker serving as a fill-in bassist across three shows the same year.

== Members ==
=== Current members ===
Image	Name	Years active	Instruments	Release contributions
	Morrissey	1988–present	lead vocals; occasional tambourine	all releases
	Jesse Tobias	2005–present	guitar	all releases from Live at Earls Court (2005) to Make-Up Is a Lie (2026)
	Matt Walker	2007–2020; 2024–present	drums	all releases from Years of Refusal (2009) to I Am Not a Dog on a Chain (2020)
	Juan Galeano	2022-present	bass	Make-Up Is a Lie (2026)
	Camila Grey	2023–present	keyboards	Make-Up Is a Lie (2026)
	Carmen Vandenberg	2023–present	guitar	Make-Up Is a Lie (2026)

=== Former members ===
Image	Name	Years active	Instruments	Release contributions
	Stephen Street	1988; 1989–1991	bass; guitar; keyboards	Viva Hate (1988); "The Last of the Famous International Playboys" & "Interesting Drug" (1989); "Ouija Board, Ouija Board" (1989) songwriting only
	Andrew Paresi	1988; 1989–1991	drums	Viva Hate (1988); "Ouija Board, Ouija Board" (1989); "November Spawned a Monster" & "Piccadilly Palare" (1990); Kill Uncle (1991); "Pregnant for the Last Time" & "My Love Life" (1991)
	Vini Reilly	1988	guitar; keyboards	Viva Hate (1988)
	Andy Rourke	1988–1990	bass	"The Last of the Famous International Playboys" & "Interesting Drug" (1989); "November Spawned a Monster" & "Piccadilly Palare" (1990)
	Mike Joyce	1988–1989	drums	"The Last of the Famous International Playboys" & "Interesting Drug" (1989)
	Craig Gannon	1988–1989	guitar	"The Last of the Famous International Playboys" & "Interesting Drug" (1989)
	Neil Taylor	1989	guitar	"The Last of the Famous International Playboys" & "Interesting Drug" (1989)
	Matthew Seligman	1989 (died 2020)	bass	"Ouija Board, Ouija Board" (1989)
	Kevin Armstong	1989–1990	guitar	"Ouija Board, Ouija Board" (1989); "November Spawned a Monster" & "Piccadilly Palare" (1990)
	Mark E. Nevin	1990–1992	guitar	Kill Uncle (1991); "Pregnant for the Last Time" & "My Love Life" (1991); Your Arsenal (1992) songwriting only
	Mark Bedford	1990–1991	bass	Kill Uncle (1991)
	Boz Boorer	1991–2020	guitar; backing vocals	all releases from "Sing Your Life" (1991) to I Am Not a Dog on a Chain (2020)
	Alain Whyte	1991–2009; 2021–2023; 2026	guitar; backing vocals	all releases from "Sing Your Life" (1991) to Ringleader of the Tormentors (2006); Years of Refusal (2009) songwriting only; Make-Up Is a Lie (2026)
	Spencer Cobrin	1991–1993; 1994–1997	drums	Your Arsenal (1992); Beethoven Was Deaf (1993); Southpaw Grammar (1995); Maladjusted (1997)
	Jonny Bridgwood	1991; 1993–1997	bass	"Pregnant for the Last Time" (1991); Vauxhall and I (1994); Southpaw Grammar (1995); Maladjusted (1997)
	Gary Day	1991–1993; 1999–2006	bass	Your Arsenal (1992); Beethoven Was Deaf (1993); You Are the Quarry (2004); Live at Earls Court (2005); Ringleader of the Tormentors (2006)
	Woodie Taylor	1993–1994	drums	Vauxhall and I (1994); "Boxers" & "Sunny" (1995)
	Spike T. Smith	1999–2002	drums	none
	Dean Butterworth	2003–2005	drums	all releases from You Are the Quarry (2004) to Live at Earls Court (2005)
	Roger Joseph Manning Jr.	2003–2004; 2008; 2020	keyboards; backing vocals	You Are the Quarry (2004); Years of Refusal (2009); I Am Not a Dog on a Chain (2020)
	Michael Farrell	2004–2008	keyboards; backing vocals	all releases from Live at Earls Court (2005) to Years of Refusal (2009)
	Barrie Cadogan	2004	guitar	none - substitute for Alain Whyte
	Matt Chamberlain	2005–2007	drums	Ringleader of the Tormentors (2006)
	Solomon Walker	2007–2014; 2021; 2024	bass	Years of Refusal (2009); World Peace Is None of Your Business (2014)
	Gustavo Manzur	2009-2023; 2026	keyboards; backing vocals; guitar	all releases from World Peace Is None of Your Business (2014) to Make-Up Is a Lie (2026)
	Mando Lopez	2014–2020	bass	all releases from Low in High School (2017) to I Am Not a Dog on a Chain (2020)
	Brendan Buckley	2021-2024; 2026	drums	Make-Up Is a Lie (2026)

== Timeline ==
=== Recording timeline ===
Role	Album													
Role	Viva Hate (1988)	Kill Uncle (1991)	Your Arsenal (1992)	Vauxhall and I (1994)	Southpaw Grammar (1995)	Mal- adjusted (1997)	You Are the Quarry (2004)	Ringleader of the Tormentors (2006)	Years of Refusal (2009)	World Peace Is None of Your Business (2014)	Low in High School (2017)	California Son (2019)	I Am Not a Dog on a Chain (2020)	Make-Up Is a Lie (2026)
Guitars	Vini Reilly, Stephen Street	Mark E. Nevin	Alain Whyte, Boz Boorer	Alain Whyte, Boz Boorer	Alain Whyte, Boz Boorer	Alain Whyte, Boz Boorer	Alain Whyte, Boz Boorer	Alain Whyte, Boz Boorer, Jesse Tobias	Boz Boorer, Jesse Tobias	Boz Boorer, Jesse Tobias	Boz Boorer, Jesse Tobias	Boz Boorer, Jesse Tobias	Boz Boorer, Jesse Tobias	Jesse Tobias, Carmen Vandenberg
Bass	Stephen Street	Mark Bedford	Gary Day	Jonny Bridgwood	Jonny Bridgwood	Jonny Bridgwood	Gary Day	Gary Day	Solomon Walker	Solomon Walker	Mando Lopez	Mando Lopez	Mando Lopez	Juan Galeano
Drums	Andrew Paresi	Andrew Paresi	Spencer Cobrin	Woodie Taylor	Spencer Cobrin	Spencer Cobrin	Dean Butterworth	Matt Chamberlain	Matt Walker	Matt Walker	Matt Walker	Matt Walker	Matt Walker	Brendan Buckley
Key- boards	Vini Reilly	Seamus Beaghen, Steven Heart	None	None	None	None	Roger Manning	Michael Farrell	Roger Manning, Michael Farrell	Gustavo Manzur	Gustavo Manzur	Gustavo Manzur	Gustavo Manzur, Roger Manning	Camila Grey

== Line-ups ==
Period	Members	Releases
October – December 1988 (session only)	Morrissey – vocals; Stephen Street – bass, guitar; Vini Reilly – guitars, keyboards; Andrew Paresi – drums; Richard Koster – violin; Fenella Barton – violin; Rachel Maguire – cello; Mark Davies – cello; Robert Woolhard – cello; John Metcalf – viola	Viva Hate (1988)
December 1988	Morrissey – vocals; Craig Gannon – guitar; Andy Rourke – bass; Mike Joyce – drums	none – one live performance
January 1989	Morrissey – vocals; Craig Gannon – guitar; Andy Rourke – bass; Mike Joyce – drums; Stephen Street – keyboards	"The Last of the Famous International Playboys" (1989)
April 1989	Morrissey – vocals; Craig Gannon – guitar; Andy Rourke – bass; Mike Joyce – drums; Stephen Street – keyboards; Neil Taylor – guitar; Kirsty MacColl – backing vocals	"Interesting Drug" (1989)
November 1989	Morrissey – vocals; Andrew Paresi – drums; Kirsty MacColl – backing vocals; Kevin Armstrong – guitar; Matthew Seligman – bass; Steve Hopkins – piano	"Ouija Board, Ouija Board" (1989)
April 1990	Morrissey – vocals; Andrew Paresi – drums; Kevin Armstrong – guitar; Andy Rourke – bass guitar; Mary Margaret O'Hara – vocals	"November Spawned a Monster" (1990)
October 1990	Morrissey – vocals; Andrew Paresi – drums; Kevin Armstrong – guitar; Andy Rourke – bass guitar	"Piccadilly Palare" (1990)
1990 – 1991	Morrissey – vocals; Andrew Paresi – drums, percussion; Mark E. Nevin – guitar; Mark Bedford – bass guitar; Seamus Beaghen – keyboards; Steven Heart – keyboards; Nawazish Ali Khan – violin; Linder Sterling – backing vocals	Kill Uncle (1991)
1991	Morrissey – vocals; Andrew Paresi – drums, percussion; Mark E. Nevin – guitar; Mark Bedford – bass guitar	"My Love Life" (1991)
1991	Morrissey – vocals; Mark E. Nevin – guitar; Andrew Paresi – drums; Boz Boorer – guitar; Jonny Bridgwood – bass	"Pregnant for the Last Time" (1991)
1991 – 1993	Morrissey – vocals; Boz Boorer – guitar; Alain Whyte – guitar; Gary Day – bass; Spencer Cobrin – drums	At KROQ (1991); Your Arsenal (1992); Beethoven Was Deaf (1993)
1993 – 1994	Morrissey – vocals; Boz Boorer – guitar; Alain Whyte – guitar; Jonny Bridgwood – bass; Woodie Taylor – drums	Vauxhall and I (1994); "Boxers" & "Sunny" (1995)
1994 – 1998	Morrissey – vocals; Boz Boorer – guitar; Alain Whyte – guitar; Jonny Bridgwood – bass; Spencer Cobrin – drums	Southpaw Grammar (1995); Maladjusted (1997)
1999 – 2002	Morrissey – vocals; Boz Boorer – guitar; Alain Whyte – guitar; Gary Day – bass; Spike T. Smith – drums	none – live performances only
2003 – 2004	Morrissey – vocals; Boz Boorer – guitar; Alain Whyte – guitar; Gary Day – bass; Dean Butterworth – drums; Roger Joseph Manning Jr. – keyboards	You Are the Quarry (2004)
2004 – 2005	Morrissey – vocals; Boz Boorer – guitar; Alain Whyte – guitar; Gary Day – bass; Dean Butterworth – drums; Michael Farrell – keyboards	Sessions@AOL (2004)
2005	Morrissey – vocals; Boz Boorer – guitar; Alain Whyte – guitar; Gary Day – bass; Dean Butterworth – drums; Michael Farrell – keyboards; Jesse Tobias – guitar	Live at Earls Court (2005); Ringleader of the Tormentors (2006)
2005 – 2007	Morrissey – vocals; Boz Boorer – guitar; Alain Whyte – guitar; Gary Day – bass; Michael Farrell – keyboards; Jesse Tobias – guitar; Matt Chamberlain – drums	none – live performances only
2007	Morrissey – vocals; Boz Boorer – guitar; Alain Whyte – guitar; Michael Farrell – keyboards; Jesse Tobias – guitar; Matt Chamberlain – drums; Solomon Walker – bass	none – live performances only
2007 – 2008	Morrissey – vocals; Boz Boorer – guitar; Alain Whyte – guitar (live only); Michael Farrell – keyboards; Jesse Tobias – guitar; Solomon Walker – bass; Matt Walker – drums	Years of Refusal (2009)
2008 – 2009	Morrissey – vocals; Boz Boorer – guitar; Alain Whyte – guitar (live only); Jesse Tobias – guitar; Solomon Walker – bass; Matt Walker – drums; Roger Joseph Manning Jr. – keyboards	Years of Refusal (2009)
2009 – 2014	Morrissey – vocals; Boz Boorer – guitar; Jesse Tobias – guitar; Solomon Walker – bass; Matt Walker – drums; Roger Joseph Manning Jr. – keyboards	Years of Refusal (2009)
2014	Morrissey – vocals; Boz Boorer – guitar; Jesse Tobias – guitar; Solomon Walker – bass; Matt Walker – drums; Gustavo Manzur – keyboards	World Peace Is None of Your Business (2014)
2014 – 2021	Morrissey – vocals; Boz Boorer – guitar; Jesse Tobias – guitar; Matt Walker – drums; Gustavo Manzur – keyboards; Mando Lopez – bass	Low in High School (2017); California Son (2019); I Am Not a Dog on a Chain (2020)
May 2021 – late 2021	Morrissey – vocals; Jesse Tobias – guitar; Gustavo Manzur – keyboards; Alain Whyte – guitar; Solomon Walker – bass; Brendan Buckley – drums	none – live performances only
May 2022 – March 2023	Morrissey – vocals; Jesse Tobias – guitar; Gustavo Manzur – keyboards; Alain Whyte – guitar; Brendan Buckley – drums; Juan Galeano – bass	none – live performances only
July 2023 – February 2024	Morrissey – vocals; Jesse Tobias – guitar; Brendan Buckley – drums; Juan Galeano – bass; Camila Grey – keyboards; Carmen Vandenberg – guitar	none – live performances only
July 2024 – present	Morrissey – vocals; Jesse Tobias – guitar; Juan Galeano - bass; Camila Grey – keyboards; Carmen Vandenberg – guitar; Matt Walker – drums	Make-Up Is a Lie (2026) (without Walker)

== Other musicians ==
- From Viva Hate
  - Richard Koster, Fenella Barton — violins
  - Rachel Maguire, Mark Davies, Robert Woolhard — cellos
  - John Metcalf - viola
- From Bona Drag
  - Kirsty Maccoll - backing vocals on "Interesting Drug"
  - Mary Margaret O'Hara - backing vocals on "November Spawned a Monster"
  - Stephen Hopkins - piano on "Ouija Board, Ouija Board"
- From Kill Uncle
  - Seamus Beaghen and Steven Heart – keyboards
  - Nawazish Ali Khan – violin
- From Ringleader of the Tormentors
  - Ennio Morricone - string arrangement on "Dear God Please Help Me"
  - Laura Adriani, Gaia e Andrea Baroni, Niccolo Centioni, Julia D'Andrea, Alice e Ester Diodovich, Marco Lorecchio, Charlotte Patrignani - Children's choir on "The Youngest Was the Most Loved", "The Father Who Must Be Killed" and "At Last I Am Born"
- From Years of Refusal
  - Roger Joseph Manning Jr. – keyboards
  - Mark Isham – trumpet on "I'm Throwing My Arms Around Paris", "When Last I Spoke to Carol" and "One Day Goodbye Will Be Farewell"
  - Jeff Beck – guitar on "Black Cloud"
  - Michael Farrell – keyboards, accordion, cowbell on "That's How People Grow Up"
  - Kristopher Pooley – Backing vocals on "Mama Lay Softly on the Riverbed", "When Last I Spoke to Carol" and "One Day Goodbye Will Be Farewell"
  - Kristeen Young – additional vocals on "That's How People Grow Up"
  - Chrissie Hynde – backing vocals on "Shame Is the Name"
- From World Peace Is None of Your Business
  - Kristeen Young – backing vocals
- From Low in High School
  - H.E.R. – violin on "The Girl from Tel-Aviv Who Wouldn't Kneel" and "Israel"
  - Steve Aho – orchestration
  - Songa Lee – violin
  - Kathleen Sloan – violin
  - Erik Arvinder – viola
  - Andy Martin – trombone
  - Fred Simmons – trombone
- From California Son
  - Steve Aho – orchestration on "Loneliness Remembers What Happiness Forgets" and "Lady Willpower"
  - Billie Joe Armstrong – backing vocals on "Wedding Bell Blues"
  - Brigette Bryant – group vocals on "Wedding Bell Blues"
  - Ed Droste^{[a]} – backing vocals on "Only a Pawn in Their Game"
  - Ariel Engle – backing vocals on "Don't Interrupt the Sorrow"
  - Sameer Gadhia – backing vocals on "Days of Decision"
  - Petra Haden – backing vocals on "When You Close Your Eyes"
  - Sean Hurley – bass guitar on "It's Over" and "Loneliness Remembers What Happiness Forgets"
  - Little Willie Iniesta – dog barking/vocals on "When You Close Your Eyes"
  - Dave Levita – acoustic guitar
  - LP – additional vocals on "It's Over"
  - Roger Joseph Manning Jr. - keyboards
  - Arnold McCuller – group vocals on "Wedding Bell Blues"
  - Lydia Night – backing vocals on "Wedding Bell Blues"
  - Valerie Pinkston – group vocals "Wedding Bell Blues"
  - Zac Rae – organ, upright piano, keyboards on "Days of Decision" and "Some Say I Got Devil"
- From I Am Not a Dog on a Chain
  - Steve Aho – orchestration on "Knockabout World"
  - Daniel Cayotte – recitation on "The Secret of Music"
  - Sally Chae – backing vocals on "Darling, I Hug a Pillow"
  - Mike Daly – drum programming and synthesizer on "Once I Saw the River Clean"
  - Glendale Tab & Apple Choir – kids choir on "My Hurling Days Are Done"
  - Thelma Houston – vocals on "Bobby, Don't You Think They Know?"
  - Sean Hurley – bass guitar on "What Kind of People Live in These Houses?"
  - Victor Indrizzo – drums on "What Kind of People Live in These Houses?"
  - Greg Leisz – pedal steel guitar on "What Kind of People Live in These Houses?"
  - Danny Levin – trumpet on "Darling, I Hug a Pillow"
  - Roger Manning – harmonium on "The Truth About Ruth", Mellotron on "Love Is on Its Way Out", organ on "The Truth About Ruth", piano on "My Hurling Days Are Done", string and horn arrangements on "Knockabout World", synthesizer on "Jim Jim Falls", "Bobby, Don't You Think They Know?", "I Am Not a Dog on a Chain", "What Kind of People Live in These Houses?", "Knockabout World", "Once I Saw the River Clean", "The Secret of Music" and "My Hurling Days Are Done", backing vocals on "What Kind of People Live in These Houses?", "Knockabout World" and "My Hurling Days Are Done"
  - Karla Manzur – backing vocals on "Love Is on Its Way Out"
  - Rose Mary – laughing on "The Secret of Music"
  - David Ralicke – saxophone on "Bobby, Don't You Think They Know?"
  - Bridget Regan – fiddle on "Once I Saw the River Clean"
  - Megan Sluiter – laughing on "The Secret of Music"
- From Make-Up Is a Lie
  - Ambroise Sage – string arrangement on "Notre Dame"
  - Karen Ann - backing vocal on "Zoom Zoom the Little Boy" and "The Monsters of Pig Alley"

== Studio personnel ==
- Stephen Street, producer, 1988 (Viva Hate)
- Clive Langer, Alan Winstanley, producer, 1991 (Kill Uncle)
- Mick Ronson, producer, 1992 (Your Arsenal)
- Steve Lillywhite, producer, 1994-1997 (Vauxhall and I, Southpaw Grammar, and Maladjusted)
- Jerry Finn, producer, 2004, 2009 (You Are the Quarry, Years of Refusal)
- Tony Visconti, producer, 2006 (Ringleader of the Tormentors)
- Joe Chiccarelli, producer, 2013-2026 (World Peace Is None of Your Business, Low in High School, California Son, I Am Not a Dog on a Chain, Make-Up Is a Lie)
