= Bonfire of Teenagers =

Unreleased studio album by Morrissey

Studio album (unreleased) by Morrissey
- Recorded: 2020–2021
- Studio: Los Angeles, California, U.S.
- Label: Capitol
- Producer: Andrew Watt

Singles from Bonfire of Teenagers
- 1. "Rebels Without Applause" Released: 25 November 2022

Bonfire of Teenagers is an unreleased studio album by the English singer Morrissey. Described by the singer as "the best album of [his] life", Bonfire of Teenagers was produced by Andrew Watt in 2020 and 2021; it features a number of guest appearances from various musicians, such as Iggy Pop, Chad Smith, Flea and Josh Klinghoffer.

Bonfire of Teenagers was originally announced in May 2021. In October 2022, Bonfire of Teenagers was given a tentative release date of February 2023 in the United States by Capitol Records. A lone track, "Rebels Without Applause", from the then-forthcoming album was released as a digital-only single in November 2022. The album, however, was postponed (and later shelved) following Morrissey's departure from Capitol in December of that year.

In February 2023, Morrissey confirmed that Capitol will not release Bonfire of Teenagers but would still hold onto the rights to it. In October 2023, Morrissey told Fox 5 New York that Capitol had offered to sell the album back to him. In April 2024, he announced that he had regained the rights to Bonfire of Teenagers and the 2014 album World Peace Is None of Your Business, which was also distributed through Capitol. Bonfire of Teenagers currently remains unreleased.

== Background ==
In March 2020, Morrissey released his thirteenth studio album I Am Not a Dog on a Chain through BMG Rights Management. Eight months later, he was dropped by BMG following the appointment of a new executive at the label. Morrissey then announced his intention to sell his next completed album to "the highest (or the lowest) bidder". On 29 October 2022, it was announced that Morrissey had signed with Capitol Records in the United States, who set a release date of the album for February 2023, although Morrissey did not sign with a UK label. As part of his deal with the label, Capitol also acquired the rights to reissue his previous solo albums Southpaw Grammar (1995), You Are the Quarry (2004), Ringleader of the Tormentors (2006), Years of Refusal (2009) and World Peace Is None of Your Business (2014).

== Composition ==
Bonfire of Teenagers was produced by Andrew Watt and recorded in Los Angeles, California in 2020 and 2021. The album features guest appearances from Iggy Pop, Red Hot Chili Peppers' members Chad Smith and Flea, as well as ex-RHCP guitarist Josh Klinghoffer.

The album's title track is about the 2017 Manchester Arena bombings, which Morrissey described as "England's 9/11".

=== Miley Cyrus contributions ===
In 2020, American singer Miley Cyrus recorded backing vocals for the song "I Am Veronica". According to Morrissey, Cyrus, a long-time admirer of him and The Smiths, volunteered to provide her vocals for the song, and later offered to appear in a music video for the song. He reflected favourably on his time working with Miley Cyrus, and described "every minute" he spent with her as "loving and funny".

Following his departure from Capitol Records in December 2022, Morrissey reported that Cyrus had requested to have her backing vocals removed from the song. Subsequently, rumours arose that Morrissey's political views were the reason behind Cyrus' decision to remove her vocals from the track; Morrissey denied this, stating that she had "backed off for reasons unconnected to me" due to "a major clash with a key figure in 'the circle' ", although he refused to disclose who it was. He also denied accusations he was far-right, and blamed four anonymous, individual "cancel vultures" with access to "the Legacy Media" for spreading misinformation about him.

== Release and promotion ==
Bonfire of Teenagers was first announced on 31 May 2021 through Morrissey's website.

Morrissey debuted several new songs from Bonfire of Teenagers live during his tours in 2022, such as "I Am Veronica" in May 2022, and the songs "Rebels Without Applause" "Sure Enough, The Telephone Rings", "I Live in Oblivion", and the title track, which were first performed at Morrissey's Las Vegas concert residency on 1 July 2022. On 28 September 2022, "Kerouac's Crack" was played live for the first and only time. On 11 November 2022, the album's final song, "Saint In A Stained Glass Window", was performed live for the first time at the Toyota Arena in Ontario, California, and at additional shows following its debut. On October 31, 2024, "I Ex-Love You" made its live debut in Houston, Texas.

On 29 October 2022, Morrissey announced that Bonfire of Teenagers had been given a tentative release date of February 2023. However, on 14 November 2022, Morrissey announced that the album had been delayed by Capitol. On 25 November 2022, Morrissey released the first single off the album, "Rebels Without Applause". Morrissey criticized an "absence of any promotion" of the single, which he described as "quite sad" and "noticeable".

On 23 December 2022, Morrissey announced that he had "voluntarily parted company" with his management firms, Maverick and Quest, and also "voluntarily withdrawn from any association with Capitol Records". Morrissey described Bonfire of Teenagers at this point as being "control[led]" by Capitol. He also announced that Miley Cyrus wanted her backing vocals taken off from the record.

On 7 February 2023, Morrissey announced that while Universal Music Group (Capitol's parent company) would still control Bonfire of Teenagers, they would not release the album. He also stated that "although he does not believe that Capitol Records in Los Angeles signed Bonfire of Teenagers in order to sabotage it, he is quickly coming around to that belief." A week later on 14 February 2023, Morrissey went on to accuse Capitol of promoting Satanism with Sam Smith, who two days prior had attracted controversy after performing their song "Unholy" with Kim Petras at the BRIT Awards 2023.

In an interview with Fox 5 New York on October 20, 2023, Morrissey revealed that Capitol had made an offer to sell the album back to him. In April 2024, Morrissey announced that he had paid Capitol for the rights to the album and claimed that every major label in London had turned down the opportunity to release it.

== Track listing ==
All lyrics are written by Morrissey; all music is composed by Morrissey and Jesse Tobias, except for "Rebels Without Applause", written by Morrissey, Andrew Watt, Boz Boorer, Chad Smith and Josh Klinghoffer, and "Diana Dors", written by Morrissey and Boorer.

Bonfire of Teenagers track listing
No.	Title	Length
1.	"I Am Veronica"
2.	"Rebels Without Applause"	3:24
3.	"Kerouac's Crack"
4.	"Ha Ha Harlem"
5.	"I Live in Oblivion"
6.	"Bonfire of Teenagers"
7.	"My Funeral"
8.	"Diana Dors"
9.	"I Ex-Love You"
10.	"Sure Enough, the Telephone Rings"
11.	"Saint in a Stained Glass Window"

== Personnel ==
- Morrissey – vocals, lyrics, songwriting

Additional musicians

- Chad Smith – drums
- Flea
- Josh Klinghoffer – guitar, percussion, keys
- Iggy Pop (on "Ha Ha Harlem")
- Miley Cyrus – backing vocals (on "I Am Veronica")
- Boz Boorer – songwriting (on "Rebels Without Applause" and "Diana Dors")

Production

- Andrew Watt – producer, songwriting
