= Satellite of Love =

1973 single by Lou Reed

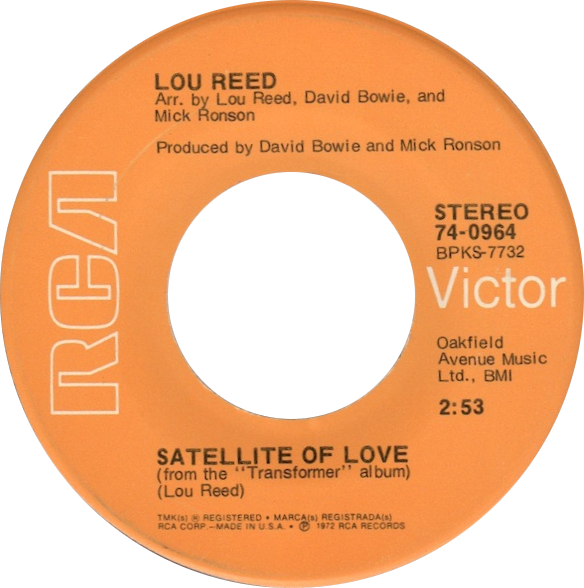
- Side A of the 1973 US single

Single by Lou Reed

from the album Transformer
- A-side: "Vicious" (Europe)
- B-side: "Walk and Talk It" (North America and Australia)
- Released: February 1973
- Studio: Trident (London)
- Genre: Glam rock; pop
- Length: 3:42
- Label: RCA Victor
- Songwriter: Lou Reed
- Producers: David Bowie; Mick Ronson

Lou Reed singles chronology
"Walk on the Wild Side" / "Perfect Day" (1972)	"Satellite of Love" (1973)	"Vicious" (1973)

Official audio
- "Satellite of Love" on YouTube

"Satellite of Love" is a song by American musician Lou Reed. It is the second single from his 1972 album Transformer. At the time of its release, it achieved minor US chart success (No. 119), though it later became a staple of his concerts and compilation albums.

== Background and recording ==
"Satellite of Love" was composed in 1970 while Reed was still a member of the Velvet Underground. Fellow member Doug Yule, in a 2005 interview, recalled Reed's first mentioning the song to him in the summer of 1970 while they were riding in the back of a limousine with Steve Sesnick: "Steve was there going on about "how we needed airplay", and Lou said "I have this song 'Satellite of Love', and he mentioned the satellite that had just gone up which was a big deal in the news at the time, cause the space race was happening, and Steve Sesnick said 'Yeah, yeah – that'll do it!'" While the band had soon recorded a demo track in the summer of 1970 during the sessions for Loaded, it did not make the final album.

The song is about a man who observes a satellite launch on television, and contemplates what Reed describes as feelings of "the worst kind of jealousy" about his unfaithful girlfriend. The chorus is:

I watched it for a little while
I love to watch things on TV
Satellite of love
Satellite of love

David Bowie, who produced the album with Mick Ronson, provided background vocals, especially for the final chorus. Reed wrote later: "He has a melodic sense that's just well above anyone else in rock & roll. Most people could not sing some of his melodies. He can really go for a high note. Take 'Satellite of Love', on my Transformer album. There's a part at the very end where his voice goes all the way up. It's fabulous."

The existence of the original Velvet Underground version was unknown until the release of the box set Peel Slowly and See in 1995. It also appears on the 1997 Rhino Records 2-CD version of the Loaded album.

In addition to being more up-tempo, the band's version contains a significant change in the lyrics. The lines:

I've been told that you've been bold
With Harry, Mark, and John
Monday, Tuesday, Wednesday to Thursday
With Harry, Mark, and John

were originally recorded as:

I've been told baby you've been bold
With Winkin, Blinkin, and Nod
Monday, Tuesday, Wednesday to Thursday
To Winkin, Blinkin, and Nod

Reflecting on the original lyrics, Reed said, "Jesus. Best left forgotten. Obviously, I didn't want to use real names yet. I probably wanted to make sure I wasn't using a name that really meant something to me."

== Personnel ==
- Lou Reed – guitar, lead vocals
- David Bowie and the Thunderthighs – backing vocals
- Trevor Bolder – trumpet
- Herbie Flowers – tuba
- Mick Ronson – piano, recorder
- Klaus Voormann – bass
- John Halsey – drums

== Reception ==
Cash Box called it "another strange effort that should attract a varied crowd of record buyers" and "stands a great commercial shot at scoring many chart points." Record World called it a "cosmic composition" and said that "David Bowie's genius is there in the production."

== Certifications ==
Region	Certification	Certified units/sales
United Kingdom (BPI)	Silver	200,000^{‡}
^{‡} Sales+streaming figures based on certification alone.

== Satellite of Love '04 version ==
"Satellite of Love '04"

Single by Lou Reed (remixes by Dab Hands & Groovefinder)
- Released: July 2004
- Genre: House
- Length: 3:05 (Dab Hands Retouch Radio Edit); 6:53 (Dab Hands Retouch); 8:00 (Groovefinder Remix)
- Label: NuLife Recordings
- Songwriter: Lou Reed
- Producers: Mick Ronson; David Bowie; Groovefinder; Dab Hands

Music video
- "Satellite of Love '04" on YouTube

A single containing a remix by British producers Dab Hands, real names Mark Wilkinson, Richard Searle and Leo Elstob, was released around July 2004, reaching number 10 on the UK Singles Chart and number 2 on the UK Dance Chart. The single also contains a remix by British producer Groovefinder, whose remix served as the "original remix and idea" for the Dab Hands remix. The Dab Hands remix was used for a music video that was directed and animated by Sam Brady, also released in 2004.

=== Track listings ===
- UK single
1. "Satellite of Love '04" (Dab Hands Retouch Radio Edit) – 3:05
2. "Satellite of Love '04" (Dab Hands Retouch) – 6:53
3. "Satellite of Love '04" (Groovefinder Remix) – 8:00
- UK & Europe 12-inch single

A1. "Satellite of Love '04" (Dab Hands Retouch)
A2. "Satellite of Love '04" (Dab Hands Retouch Radio Edit)
B1. "Satellite of Love '04" (Groovefinder Remix)

=== Charts ===
Chart (2004)	Peak position
Netherlands (Single Top 100)	100
UK Singles (Official Charts)	10

== Morrissey version ==
"Satellite of Love"

Single by Morrissey
- Released: 2 December 2013
- Length: 3:46
- Label: Parlophone
- Songwriter: Lou Reed
- Producers: David Millward, Mick Ronson

Morrissey singles chronology
"The Last of the Famous International Playboys" (2013)	"Satellite of Love" (2013)	"World Peace Is None of Your Business" (2014)

Morrissey's live cover of the song was digitally released on 2 December 2013 as a tribute to Reed, following his death in 2013. The song was recorded on 25 November 2011 in at the Chelsea Ballroom of Cosmopolitan of Las Vegas in Nevada. The 7" and 12" vinyl version and a three-track digital version were also released on January 28, 2014. All three versions of the single were supported by additional live tracks, including a rendition of the Smiths' song "Vicar in a Tutu", a cover of Buzzcocks' song "You Say You Don't Love Me" and his 1992 song "You're Gonna Need Someone on Your Side". The cover topped the U.S. Billboard Hot Singles Sales chart.

=== Track listing ===
12"

A-side

1. "Satellite of Love" (Live)
2. "You're Gonna Need Someone on Your Side"

B-side

1. "Vicar in a Tutu" (Live)
2. "All You Need Is Me" (Live)

7"

A-side

1. "Satellite of Love" (Live)

B-side

1. "You're Gonna Need Someone on Your Side"
2. "You Say You Don't Love Me" (Live) (Buzzcocks cover)

Digital download

1. "Satellite of Love" (Live)
2. "You're Gonna Need Someone on Your Side"
3. "Mama Lay Softly on the Riverbed" (Live)

=== Credits and personnel ===
- Morrissey – lead vocals
- Boz Boorer – guitar, mixing
- Jesse Tobias – guitar
- Gustavo Manzur – piano, backing vocals
- Solomon Walker – bass
- Matt Walker – drums
- David Millward – recording, production
- Scott Minshall – design
- Bill Inglot – mastering
- Dan Hersch – mastering
- Renaud Monfourny – photography
- Mick Ronson – production ("You're Gonna Need Someone on Your Side")

=== Charts ===
Chart (2014)	Peak position
US Billboard Hot Singles Sales	1
