= Alex Lusty =

- Born: 9 April 1973 (age 53); England
- Genres: Rap, punk, urban folk, alternative/experimental
- Occupations: Lyricist, rapper, singer, producer
- Years active: 1999–present
- Labels: Shifty Disco, Rotator, Hoolie Tunes, Revolver, Drive By Shouting
- Website: www.lusty-music.co.uk

Alex Lusty (born 9 April 1973) is a British rapper.

== Early influences ==
While growing up, Lusty listened to hip hop. His work has been influenced by Public Enemy (band), Beastie Boys, Melle Mel, KRS-One, Kool G Rap, Rakim, Kool Keith, and Nas. Lusty is also a Morrissey fan and has attended more than 80 Morrissey concerts, it this fandom led directly to the creation of his projects The OneThree and Happy Martyr. Lusty also cites Half Man Half Biscuit as his favourite band.

== Musical projects ==
=== Frigid Vinegar ===
Alex Lusty's first release was "Dogmonaut 2000" under the guise Frigid Vinegar in 1999. The single sampled It's Not Unusual by Tom Jones and was first released on Oxford-based Shifty Disco records. The single was championed by DJ Steve Lamacq on the evening session where it went on to be one of the year's most requested records. Frigid Vinegar performed the track "Jack Biscuit" live on Lamacq's show from Maida Vale studios. Frigid Vinegar recorded 4 tracks in session for Lamacq, one of the tracks being "Lamacqmanaut 2000" a reworking of "Dogmonaut 2000" with several lyric changes paying homage to the DJ. The track also found its way onto a CD compilation of Lamacq session tracks (Bootleg Session 3) that was given away with the Melody Maker magazine. "Dogmonaut 2000" was also played on BBC daytime shows by DJs Mark and Lard, Chris Moyles, Jo Whiley and Dave Pearce, and appeared on the UK singles chart. Frigid Vinegar also appeared 10 times on the Radio 1 roadshow playing to over 200,000 people. The year was ended with four university gigs supporting the Shirehorses the comedy band of DJs Mark and Lard

The next single "How Cheap Is Your Love?" was released on Rotator records the following year and was both the Melody Maker and Daily Mirror's single of the week. It was again championed by Lamacq on Radio 1 and made it to number 5 in the chart of the year.

More singles followed: "Jesus Presley Superstar" and "Diddleysquat". "Diddleysquat" featured Family Fortunes game show host Les Dennis singing the chorus and appearing in the video. The last Frigid Vinegar single, "Champagne", was released 1 January 2002. Following its release Lusty assembled a 5-piece band to back him for a UK tour that year. In addition to headlining, Frigid Vinegar also supported Echobelly.

=== Acarine ===
It was then Lusty teamed with Brett Gordon to form Acarine. The first single "Blinder" sampled the theme from the 1970s television show Minder and was played by Zane Lowe and Chris Moyles. The next single "God Shoots Jesus Saves" sampled the 1980 movie The Long Good Friday and was released on limited edition numbered 7-inch vinyl only. Acarine were then signed to CNR, a subsidiary of RoadRunner records, where they released the singles "Screw Your Head On" and "Organ Donor", as well as the 14 track album Call It On. The duo, along with live drummer Paul Kodish and Scratch DJ Matt Lewis, played the Glastonbury and Glade festival. They also toured with Chumbawamba and headlined shows in London at Koko, Dublin Castle, 93 Feet East, Bar Fly and Liberty. In addition, they supported the Cockney Rejects at the first Rejects' London show in 20 years.

Gigs in London were attended by ex-football hooligan turned author Cass Pennant. A track on the album was written and recorded about Pennant, and they performed at his book launch for Rolling with the 657 Crew about Portsmouth F.C. hooligans. Ex-Stoke City hooligan Mark Chester followed suit and had Acarine perform at the launch for his book Naughty Forty. Director Lexi Alexander then asked Acarine to provide a song for his film Green Street starring Elijah Wood which was about West Ham United hooligans. Acarine recorded the song "Stand Your Ground" for Green Street. The band also appeared in the film as extras. Subsequently, a proposed gig in Southend was cancelled by the police and the local Council following concerns about violence from rival hooligans.

=== The OneThree ===
In December 2004, Lusty met Morrissey and Polecats guitarist Boz Boorer backstage at an after show party at Morrissey's Earl Court show in London. Alex and Boz discussed recording together, and soon after The OneThree was born. Lusty wrote the lyrics and provided vocals, while Boz wrote the music and played guitar. Brett Gordon was again involved, this time playing bass, songwriting and handling the production as well as all chorus and backing vocals and contributing to arrangement. A 13 track album, Life Goes On, was recorded and released on Revolver Records in August 2005. The album was well-reviewed and BBC Radio 2's Janice Long and BBC 6 Music's Phil Jupitus both played the album's lead track Dive In.

=== Loner Party ===
A second album for The OneThree was planned. Lusty had an album's worth of lyrics written, but Boz Boorer was unavailable as he was away on a world tour with Morrissey. Lusty and Gordon decided to put the lyrics to an alt, lo fi project called Loner Party. Again, Lusty provided the lyrics and vocals while Brett provided the music. The 14 tracks were released on the album Protest Is Dead. The album was signed by Electronica label CCT Records and was released for download in May 2007.

The Loner Party album was the last release Lusty made with Gordon.

=== Lusty and Buzz ===
In September 2008, Lusty joined up with the 'mysterious' Buzz as Lusty And Buzz for a single called Playin Dirty, a wry look at the pornographic film business. The video was even given credence by appearances from well-known established porn stars Lolly Badcock, Amber Leigh, Rio Mariah and Sensi.

=== Who Shot Who? ===
Lusty then teamed up with old friend and ex-Nightingales and Goldblade guitarist Peter Byrchmore. They combined Peter's love of punk and Lusty's love of hip hop to form Who Shot Who?, an alternative punk/rap project. The first single Have You Seen Annette? was released on Lusty's own label, Drive-By Shouting Records. The video was shot by Terry Stephens and featured UK porn star Shay Hendrix. Gigs throughout the UK followed with bands 999, Anti Nowhere League, Sham 69, The Lurkers, Total Chaos and at the Nice and Sleazy Festival. The 13 track album Onwards And Upwards was released and tracks were played by Rodney Bingenheimer on legendary LA Radio station KROQ-FM. Reviews followed in Big Cheese and Rock Sound magazine. A second single, The Murder Of a Good Man, was released on download. The song was in tribute to the murdered weapons of mass destruction inspector, Dr David Kelly. More gigs followed including ones in Dublin with Paranoid Visions and at the Bearded Theory Festival. Lusty and Byrchmore have never ruled out writing new material for another Who Shot Who? album.

=== Happy Martyr ===
Happy Martyr was born when Lusty and Boz Boorer finally found time to work on a second album together. The plan was to record some acoustic folk rap, a very stripped down affair inspired by a shared love of Johnny Cash, and which Boorer describes as "a MC fronting early Tyrannosaurus Rex." The album was recorded between London and Boorer's studio at Serra Vista in Portugal. Serra Vista was also the location for the video, shot by Terry Stephens, for the debut single Painkillers, released 4 April 2011. Painkillers got its first airplay via Janice Long on her Radio 2 show, and was released on Lusty's Drive By Shouting Records label via download. The duo's first show was in London at the 12 Bar in April 2010. The album was completed in breaks between Boorer's hectic touring schedule with Morrissey. The second single Sleep Tight was released on 4 July 2011, with Terry Stephens again directing and filming the video. Both singles received very positive reviews. A short autumn tour took place taking in Birmingham, Manchester, London and Dublin. This Small Town from the upcoming album was released as a teaser track on soundcloud 11 December 2011. Kiss Me Like You Stole It, a track from the as yet to be released album, was released on YouTube as a video. Directed and filmed by David J. Harris, the video is shot in black and white and features scenes from Brighton Rock in the background. The 13 track debut Happy Martyr, One Square Mile, was released on Floating World Records 30 January 2012. A 6-city tour was undertaken 20–28 January in support of the album, visiting Southend, Swindon, Winchester, London, Manchester and Birmingham. The London show featured percussionist Woodie Taylor, who played on Morrissey's Vauxhall and I. The fourth Happy Martyr single was "Christmas Kisses", released for download 17 December 2012.

September 2013 saw the release of a new single produced by Markus Kienzl. A short tour followed with Conflict and ex Morrissey drummer Spike Smith playing drums.

On 18 August 2014, the second Happy Martyr album Nothing Like Love was released via CD and download on the band's own Suitcase Records. It was preceded by a video for the track 'All lies lead to the truth' shot in and around Camden. There were no live shows to promote the album due to Boz's commitments to the Morrissey tour.

In 2016, Lusty and Boorer were briefly reunited when Lusty provided vocals for the track "Noizey Fryday" on Boz's solo album Age Of Boom.

=== Solo work ===
In 2012, Lusty returned to rap. The first single, "Self Medication", was released on his website on 24 September. The video for the single was filmed and edited by Terry Stephens. Lusty continued working on his debut solo album, completing production in the latter part of 2012. The second single, "Country Bumpkin", was released 21 January 2013. The video was again filmed and produced by Terry Stephens and was released 14 January 2013.

The album Public Mental Breakdown was released in February 2013 as a 13 track free download via Lusty's website. A third video was taken from the album Bad Places again filmed by Terry Stephens and starred Lusty and Sensi as TV detectives in a spoof of 1970s cop shows.

January 2014 saw Lusty released brand new single 'Where You're At' which sampled Rakim in the chorus. The video featured British adult actress Michelle Thorne who played Lusty's therapist.

A new album Meet Uncle Splash was released on both CD and download in February on Drive-By Shouting, again with 13 tracks. Gigs with Pharorahe Monch, Akala and Ugly Duckling followed to promote it.

In May 2014, a video for the album's first track "Just Like Me" was unveiled which featured friends and associates of Lusty.

=== With Markus Kienzl ===
In June 2014, Lusty teamed up with Austrian producer and member of seminal electronica act Sofa Surfers to release the 4 track EP 'For Gods Sake' on Fabrique records, http://www.fabrique.at/store/all-releases/markus-kienzl A video for the track 'Terror' was released as an early taster as well as a video for 'Well' which was shot and recorded in Vienna and used to launch the EP.

Markus asked Lusty to guest on the EP with him after remixing the Happy Martyr single 'Empty Handed'.

=== Rats From A Sinking Ship ===
At the beginning of 2015 Lusty formed another band, Rats From A Sinking Ship with the guitarist from Ilkeston Jamie Price. The idea was to form a hard sounding, hard-hitting political band. Demo's were quickly turned into recordings and the debut album 'Rise As One' was released on 22 August 2015 on CD and download. Lusty's ninth studio album release.

The band's live debut came at Cargo in London supporting Pop Will Eat Itself. Rats burst onto the scene with the anti-war 'Kill one kill two' video. A song that was championed by legendary Philadelphia rapper Vinnie Paz who went on to make a cameo in the band's second video release 'No Nazi'

A third video was made from the album, this time for the title track which featured shocking clips of Police brutality. Gigs followed from Glasgow to Nottingham to Brighton, Sheffield, Gateshead, Canterbury, Manchester, Derby, Coventry, Swindon, Birmingham and the Great British Alternative Festival in Skegness.

Another full tour for 2016 took place including supports with S*M*A*S*H and Senser. The band's second album 'The Peasants' Revolt was released on 17 September on the Drive-By Shouting label. The album was launched at a gig at Avant-Garde in Glasgow the night of the 17th. The first video released from the album was 'Hang Him' an attack on former Prime Minister Tony Blair. A track on the album 'Fuct Up' also featured special guest Philadelphia rap legend Vinnie Paz.

The next video released from the album was the more acoustic-based 'If You Must Shoot Animals Use A Camera' with its hard-hitting anti trophy hunting message.

A further 23 more gigs across the country took place in 2017/2018 including two in Glasgow and Cloggerfest festival in Staffordshire.

Rats From A Sinking Ship released their third album (and Lusty's thirteenth) Fight the Future on 17 March 2018, again on CD and download on Lusty's Drive-By Shouting label.

Two videos were released from it, 'Cursory Rhymes' and the anti-Sun newspaper 'A Disgusting Filthy Rag' which drew the backing of the 'Total Eclipse of the Sun' organisation in Liverpool.

2019 began with the release of a limited edition 7 inch vinyl E.P 'With Love and Violence featuring the lead track 'Love Is The Answer'. The artwork featured a portrait painting of the late Rik Mayall as the EP's title was a quote from him. The lead track on the B side was the self-explanatory 'If You Hunt Then You're A Cunt'.

2019 proved to be a very busy year with lots of gigs up and down the country as well as an appearance at the world-famous Rebellion Festival punk four-day festival in Blackpool. The Rats also found time to record and release yet another album, this time a joint venture with long time Lusty collaborator Markus Kienzl who programmed and produced the album, creating a new crossover sound. The first track and video released from the album was 'Looney Left' featuring the poet, singer, author and actor Benjamin Zephaniah in September. The following month the Rats fourth album was released as ever on Drive-By Shouting records entitled 'We Are Heathen'.

Not wanting to rest on their laurels the band headed straight back to the studio in January 2020 to begin work on another E.P. Recorded in Nottingham the lead track was a clever cover of the old Del Amitri classic from 1989 Nothing Ever Happens. The E.P was released in March 2020 with an accompanying video where Lusty played a washed up comedian in gold lame called Jimmy Giggle. The three other tracks on the E.P were 'Muggins', 'Stop Making Stupid People Famous and 'Corrie 94'.

RFASS released their fifth album 'Glamorous Terrorists' on 31 October 2020. The album was recorded entirely during the Coronavirus pandemic lockdown with the band not been in the same room once. The Varukers drummer Kev Frost recorded the drums for the band. The first video released from the ten track LP was the aptly appropriate COVID 19 related 'Wuhan Calling' a playful reworking of The Clash's London Calling.

Rats From A Sinking Ship finally said goodbye in 2022 with a compilation / 'best of' album entitled 'Now Rats What I Call Music' a cheeky play on words of the popular 80's and 90's 'Now That's What I Call Music' series. The album also included two new songs especially recorded, 'Epilogue' and 'Epitaph'. https://thegingerquiff.com/rats-from-a-sinking-ship-now-rats-what-i-call-music-review/

=== Halfway People ===
Also in 2022 Lusty recorded an album with the Anglo-American project 'Halfway People' entirely over Skype and the internet alongside old friend and guitarist John Hernandez from Texas, the idea being to mix Texan country, Americana and Rockabilly with the British twist of Lusty's wry and sometime bleak humour and trademark melancholy. They recruited Art Villalobos on bass guitar and Gus Arellano and soon recorded and released material, with the single 'Punches' being the first. Also recruited to produce, play guitar, and drums was Doug Preston. A 12 track LP called 'The Transatlantic Express' came out that summer and received a glowing review on the Louder than War website https://louderthanwar.com/halfway-people-the-transatlantic-express-album-review/. The track "Devil Dog" featured guitar work by Boz Boorer.

=== Lusty (later) ===
In 2023 Lusty wrote, recorded and produced his first solo album in ten years. Quoted as saying in an interview with the Ginger Quiff blog, "was an album I had wanted to make for years now and an album I could only make alone to make it as authentic as I wanted." Also, "It is definitely the most personal record I have ever made, and I’m very proud of it. It was quite cathartic, writing the whole thing and producing it alone, something I’d never done before." https://thegingerquiff.com/lusty-im-going-to-make-your-death-all-about-me-album-review/ Lusty was a far departure from his previous 'boom bap' hip hop solo material and instead channeled an alternative lo-fi sound. A video was released to promote the album for the second track on the LP, 'Out Of Life'.

Then, as alluded to in the interview, Lusty returned less than a year later with the follow-up album. 'If We Can't Live Together, Then We Die Together' was released on Valentine's Day 2024. Again, reviewed and championed by the trusty Ginger Quiff who mused 'The mood of these songs swings between angry resignation, stark despair and brutal cynicism as Lusty sings his songs of life, death, love, loss, isolation and loneliness. The rawness of the songs and the vivid imagery in the lyrics suggest that many of the themes explored and the stories told come directly from personal experience'. https://thegingerquiff.com/lusty-if-we-cant-live-together-then-we-die-together-album-review/ The album was released on limited edition numbered CD as well as the usual download. A video was released for the track 'Like A Young Ken Barlow'.

=== Albums ===
- Acarine – Call It On, CNR, 2004
- The OneThree – Life Goes On, Revolver Records, 2005
- Loner Party – Protest Is Dead, CCT Records, 2007
- Who Shot Who? – Onwards and Upwards, Drive By Shouting Records, 2010
- Happy Martyr – One Square Mile, Floating World Records, 2012
- Lusty – Public Mental Breakdown, Drive Shouting Records 2013
- Lusty – Meet Uncle Splash, Drive By Shouting Records 2014
- Happy Martyr – Nothing Like Love, Suitcase Records 2014
- Kienzl And Lusty – For Gods Sake EP, Fabrique Records 2014
- Rats From A Sinking Ship – Rise As One, Drive By Shouting Records 2015
- Rats From A Sinking Ship – The Peasants' Revolt, Drive By Shouting Records 2016
- Frigid Vinegar - Viva Lou Ferringo, Drive By Shouting Records 2017
- Rats From A Sinking Ship – Fight The Future, Drive By Shouting Records 2018
- Rats From A Sinking Ship - With Love and Violence EP, Drive By Shouting Records 2019
- Rats From A Sinking Ship and Markus Kienzl - We Are Heathen, Drive By Shouting Records 2019
- Rats From A Sinking Ship - Nothing Ever Happens EP, Drive By Shouting Records 2020
- Rats From A Sinking Ship - Glamorous Terrorists, Drive By Shouting Records 2020
- Rats From A Sinking Ship - Now Rats What I Call Music, Drive By Shouting Records 2022
- Halfway People - The Transatlantic Express, Drive By Shouting Records 2022
- Lusty - I'm Gonna Make Your Death All About Me, Drive By Shouting Records 2023
- Lusty - If We Can't Live Together, Then We Die Together, Drive By Shouting Records 2024
