= Boz Boorer =

English guitarist and music producer

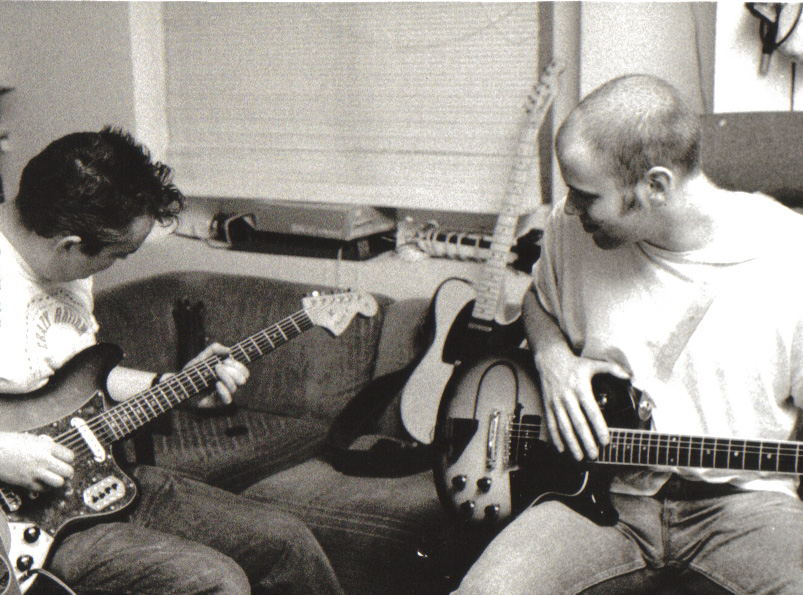
- Boz Boorer (left)

Background information
- Born: Martin James Boorer; 19 May 1962 (age 64); Edgware, Middlesex, England
- Genres: Rockabilly; pop; rock and roll
- Occupations: Guitarist; singer; songwriter; producer
- Years active: 1978–present
- Labels: EMI; RCA Victor; Mercury; Vee-Jay; Sanctuary; Fabrique
- Website: bozboorer.co.uk

Martin James "Boz" Boorer (born 19 May 1962) is an English guitarist and producer. He founded the new wave rockabilly group the Polecats, and starting in 1991 had a 30-year collaboration with singer Morrissey as co-writer, guitarist and musical director.

== Early life ==
Boz Boorer fell in love with music at an early age. He decided to play an instrument when buying T. Rex's Electric Warrior at age nine: it "basically made me want to be in a band, made me want to learn to play the guitar", which he did in 1974. The albums that impacted him the most in the 1970s during his formative years, were the Beatles's White Album, Alice Cooper's School's Out, Faces's Ooh La La, David Bowie's Hunky Dory, New York Dolls, the Sex Pistols, the Rolling Stones's Sticky Fingers, Siouxsie and the Banshees's The Scream and Elvis Presley. Elvis's The Sun Sessions was influential in his love for rockabilly.

== The Polecats ==
The band Cult Heroes was formed in 1977 by Tim Worman (known as Tim Polecat, vocalist), Boz Boorer (guitarist and vocalist), Phil Bloomberg (bassist), and Chris Hawkes (drummer). After finding much difficulty persuading promoters to book them on the rockabilly circuit with a name sounding "too punk", they adopted Hawkes' suggested band name The Polecats. Hawkes later was replaced by Neil Rooney. Three years after forming, the band signed to the fledgling British rockabilly label Nervous Records, and released the single "Rockabilly Guy" in 1979.

By 1980, the Polecats had signed to Mercury Records. The same year, they released their most successful LP Polecats Are Go!. The band had UK chart success with a David Bowie cover "John, I'm Only Dancing", a reworking of "Rockabilly Guy", and another cover version of the T.Rex song "Jeepster". In 1983, they entered the charts in the United States with their song "Make a Circuit with Me". Shortly after, John Buck replaced Neil Rooney on drums. Boorer left the group in the same year but in 1989 he led a Polecats reunion which produced a live album and a new studio set. Raucous Records released a compilation album of Boz Boorer's work titled Between The Polecats in early 2001. The band tours when time permits, and the most recent gig was at The Hot Rod Hayride in Bisley, Surrey, UK, on 30 July 2016.

== Morrissey ==
Boorer, along with guitarist Alain Whyte, joined Morrissey in 1991, when the singer assembled a new band to tour in promotion of his album Kill Uncle. With Whyte, he is credited with successfully synthesizing jangle pop and American rockabilly to create a new sound for Morrissey that helped to revitalize his career. From 1991 through 2021, Boorer worked not only as one of Morrissey's co-writers and guitarists but also as the band's musical director.

In 1994, Boorer produced a record for Morrissey for the first time: it was for the single "Interlude", a duet between Morrissey and Siouxsie Sioux, a one-off released under the banner of both artists. Notably, Boorer directed the strings section.

== Solo career and other work ==
Boorer has released solo material between his recording and touring. In 2008, he released the album Miss Pearl. Besides having a solo career, writing and playing for Morrissey and touring occasionally with the Polecats, Boorer has worked with other artists, including Adam Ant, Kirsty MacColl, Joan Armatrading, Jools Holland, and Edwyn Collins. He was in Ant's full time band in 1993-1994 for the Persuasion tour and the recording of the Wonderful album before being replaced by Kris Dollimore in 1995 due to Boorer's commitments with Morrissey. He also worked with his wife's band, the Shillelagh Sisters, between 1983 and 1998.

In 2009, Boorer produced the debut EP by Tiguana Bibles, Child of the Moon.

He and his wife own a studio in Portugal, Serra Vista Studio. In summer 2010, Boorer recorded, produced and mixed Portuguese garage/blues/rock band Murdering Tripping Blues' second album, Share the Fire.

In 2011, Happy Martyr was formed with rapper Alex Lusty. The plan was to record some acoustic, stripped-down hip-hop, which Boorer described as "an MC fronting early Tyrannosaurus Rex". The albums One Square Mile and Nothing Like Love were released in 2012 and 2014 respectively.

In August 2012, Boorer released his fourth solo album, Some of the Parts, and the single "Slippery Forces" on Fabrique Records. The song "Saunders Ferry Lane" features the vocals of James Maker. "Sunday Morning Coming Down" is a cover of the Kris Kristofferson song. John Moore of Black Box Recorder and the Jesus and Mary Chain appears as a special guest on diverse instruments.

In June 2014, Boorer teamed up with Art Brut singer Eddie Argos for a new solo single, "Girl from Atlanta", which was included on his solo album Age of Boom in 2016 for Fabrique Records. The album included tracks "Le Stalker" with vocals by Georgina Baillie, and "More Alexandria Then Rome" with vocals and lyrics by Tom Walkden of Wolventrix and The Afterword.

== Personal life ==
Boorer has been married to Lyn since 1981, and they have two daughters.

== Discography ==
=== Albums ===
==== Solo albums ====
- Between the Polecats (2001)
- My Wild Life (2003)
- Miss Pearl (2008)
- Some of the Parts (2012)
- Age of Boom (2016)
- Back to Neo (2023)
- Morrissey: Reimagined (2024)

==== With the Polecats ====
- Polecats Are Go! (1981)
- Live in Hamburg (1981)
- Cult Heroes (1984)
- Live and Rockin' (1989)
- Won't Die (1996)
- Nine (1997)
- Pink Noise (1999)
- The Best of the Polecats (2000)
- Rockabilly Guys: The Best of the Polecats (2001)
- Not Nervous! Rare 1980 Demos Remastered (2006)
- Rockabilly Cats (2008)

==== With Happy Martyr ====
- One Square Mile (2012)
- Nothing Like Love (2014)

=== Singles ===
==== Solo singles ====
- "Slippery Forces" (2012)
- "Girl from Atlanta" (feat. Eddie Argos) (2014)
- "Age of Boom" (2016)
- "A Good Day Tomorrow" (feat. Lusty) (2022)
- "Initials BB" (feat. James Maker) (2022)

==== With the Polecats ====
- "Rockabilly Guy" (1979)
- "John I'm Only Dancing" (1981) No. 35 UK
- "Rockabilly Guy" No. 35 UK
- "Jeepster" No. 53 UK
- "Make a Circuit with Me" (1983) No. 76 UK

==== With Happy Martyr ====
- "Sleep Tight" (2011)
- "Painkillers" (2012)
- "Kiss Me Like You Stole It" (2012)
- "Christmas Kisses" (2012)
- "Empty Handed" (2013)
- "All Lies Lead to the Truth" (2014)

=== Appearances/songwriting credits ===
==== Albums ====
===== Shillelagh Sisters =====
- Tyrannical Mex (1993)
- Sham'Rock & Roll (2002)

===== Morrissey =====
- Your Arsenal (1992)
- Vauxhall and I (1994)
- Southpaw Grammar (1995)
- Maladjusted (1997)
- You Are the Quarry (2004)
- Ringleader of the Tormentors (2006)
- Years of Refusal (2009)
- World Peace Is None of Your Business (2014)
- Low in High School (2017)
- California Son (2019)
- I Am Not a Dog on a Chain (2020)
- Bonfire of Teenagers (unreleased)

===== John's Children =====
- John's Children: Black & White (2011, Acid Jazz AJXCD 234)

===== Adam Ant =====
- Wonderful (1995) UK No. 24 US No. 143
- Adam Ant Is the Blueblack Hussar in Marrying the Gunner's Daughter (2013) UK No. 25 US No. 205

==== Singles ====
===== Shillelagh Sisters =====
- "Give Me My Freedom" (1984) UK No. 100.
- "Passion Fruit" (1984) UK No. 140

===== Morrissey =====
- "Sing Your Life" (1991) UK#33
- "Pregnant for the Last Time" (1991) UK#25
- "My Love Life" (1991) UK#29
- "We Hate It When Our Friends Become Successful" (1992) UK#17
- "You're the One for Me, Fatty" (1992) UK#19
- "Tomorrow" (1992)
- "Certain People I Know" (1992) UK#35
- "The More You Ignore Me, the Closer I Get" (1994) UK#8 †
- "Hold on to Your Friends" (1994) UK#48
- "Interlude" (with Siouxsie Sioux) [1994] UK#25
- "Now My Heart Is Full" (1994) †
- "Boxers" (1995) UK#23
- "Dagenham Dave" (1995) UK#26
- "The Boy Racer" (1995) UK#36
- "Sunny" (1995) UK#42
- "Alma Matters" (1997) UK#16
- "Roy's Keen" (1997) UK#42
- "Satan Rejected My Soul" (1997) UK#39 †
- "Irish Blood, English Heart" (2004) UK#3
- "First of the Gang to Die" (2004) UK#6
- "Let Me Kiss You" (2004) UK#8
- "I Have Forgiven Jesus" (2004) UK#10
- "There Is a Light That Never Goes Out" / "Redondo Beach" (2005) UK#11
- "You Have Killed Me" (2006) UK#3
- "The Youngest Was the Most Loved" (2006) UK#14
- "In the Future When All's Well" (2006) UK#17
- "I Just Want to See the Boy Happy" (2006) UK#16
- "That's How People Grow Up" (2008) UK#14 †
- "All You Need Is Me" (2008) UK#24
- "I'm Throwing My Arms Around Paris" (2009) UK#21 †
- "Something Is Squeezing My Skull" (2009) UK#46
- "Everyday Is Like Sunday" (reissue) [2010] UK#42
- "Glamorous Glue" (2011) UK#69
- "Suedehead" (Mael Mix) [2012]
- "The Last of the Famous International Playboys" (reissue) [2013]
- "Satellite of Love" (live) [2013]
- "World Peace Is None of Your Business" (2014) UK#83 †
- "Istanbul" (2014) †
- "Earth Is the Loneliest Planet" (2014)
- "The Bullfighter Dies" (2014)
- "Kiss Me a Lot" (2015)
- "Spent the Day in Bed" (2017) UK#69
- "Jacky's Only Happy When She's Up on the Stage" (2017) †
- "My Love, I'd Do Anything for You" (2018)
- "All the Young People Must Fall in Love" (2018) †
- "Back on the Chain Gang" (2018)
- "Lover-To-Be" (2019) †
- "Wedding Bell Blues" (2019)
- "It's Over" (2019)
- "Bobby, Don't You Think They Know?" (2020)
- "Honey, You Know Where to Find Me" (2020) †
- "Cosmic Dancer” (live with David Bowie) / "That's Entertainment" [2020]
- "Rebels Without Applause" (2022) †

† Written by Boorer

===== Adam Ant =====
- "Wonderful" (1995) UK No. 32 US No. 39
- "Gotta Be a Sin" (1995) UK No. 45

=== Songwriting credits with Morrissey ===
- "Now My Heart Is Full", "Spring-Heeled Jim", "The More You Ignore Me, the Closer I Get", "Lifeguard Sleeping, Girl Drowning" and "Speedway" from Vauxhall and I
- "The Teachers Are Afraid of the Pupils" and "Reader Meet Author" from Southpaw Grammar – "Honey, You Know Where to Find Me" and "You Should Have Been Nice to Me" (only on remastered version)
- "Maladjusted", "Ammunition" and "Satan Rejected My Soul" from Maladjusted - "I Can Have Both" (only on 2009 re-release).
- "Come Back to Camden", "I'm Not Sorry", "The World Is Full of Crashing Bores" and "I Like You" from You Are the Quarry
- "I'm Throwing My Arms Around Paris", "That's How People Grow Up", "Black Cloud" and "One Day Goodbye Will Be Farewell" from Years of Refusal
- "Christian Dior" from Swords - "The Slum Mums" (only on Digital Bonus Track version).
- "World Peace Is None of Your Business", "Istanbul", "Staircase at the University", "Mountjoy" and "Oboe Concerto" from World Peace Is None of Your Business – "Drag the River", "Scandinavia", "Julie in the Weeds" and "Art Hounds" (only on deluxe version)
- "I Wish You Lonely", "Jacky's Only Happy When She's Up on the Stage", "All the Young People Must Fall in Love" and "Who Will Protect Us from the Police" from Low in High School – "Lover-To-Be" and "This Song Doesn't End When It's Over" (only on deluxe version)
- "Rebels Without Applause" and "Diana Dors" from Bonfire of Teenagers
- "Jack the Ripper", "You've Had Her", "I'd Love To", "Mexico", "Noise Is the Best Revenge", "The Public Image", "Action Is My Middle Name", "The Kid's a Looker" and "Brow of My Beloved" are tracks that appeared on B-sides of Morrissey singles.
- "Kit", "I Know Who I Love", "I'm Playing Easy to Get", "Blue Dreamers Eyes" and "I Couldn't Understand Why People Laughed" are unreleased tracks.

Preceded by new role in band	Adam Ant second guitarist 1993 - 1994	Succeeded by Kris Dollimore
