= Earth Is the Loneliest Planet =

Single by Morrissey

from the album World Peace Is None of Your Business
- Released: 3 June 2014
- Recorded: La Fabrique in Saint-Rémy-de-Provence, France, February 2014
- Genre: Alternative rock
- Length: 3:38
- Label: Harvest/Capitol
- Songwriter(s): Morrissey, Gustavo Manzur
- Producer(s): Joe Chiccarelli

Morrissey singles chronology
"Istanbul" (2014)	"Earth Is the Loneliest Planet" (2014)	"The Bullfighter Dies" (2014)

"Earth Is the Loneliest Planet" is a song by English singer Morrissey. It is the fifth track on his World Peace Is None of Your Business album and was released as the third single off the album via digital download on 3 June 2014, through Harvest and Capitol Records.

Due to changes in global music consumption, the physical versions of the first four singles from this album were released together as one 10" vinyl.

== Music video ==
The accompanying music video, directed by Natalie Johns, was also released on 3 June 2014. As with the preceding videos from the album, it is presented in spoken word and features a cameo by Pamela Anderson.

== Track listing ==
Digital download

1. "Earth Is the Loneliest Planet" – 3:38

== Personnel ==
- Morrissey – vocals

Additional musicians

- Boz Boorer – guitar
- Jesse Tobias – guitar
- Solomon Walker – bass
- Matthew Walker – drums
- Gustavo Manzur – keyboards

Technical personnel

- Joe Chiccarelli – production
