= The Bullfighter Dies =

- Indonesian promotional cassette cover

Single by Morrissey

from the album World Peace Is None of Your Business
- Released: 17 June 2014
- Recorded: February 2014
- Studio: La Fabrique in Saint-Rémy-de-Provence, France
- Genre: Alternative rock
- Length: 2:03
- Label: Harvest/Capitol
- Songwriters: Morrissey, Tobias
- Producer: Joe Chiccarelli

Morrissey singles chronology
"Earth Is the Loneliest Planet" (2014)	"The Bullfighter Dies" (2014)	"Kiss Me a Lot" (2015)

"The Bullfighter Dies" is a song by English singer Morrissey. It is the seventh track on his World Peace Is None of Your Business album and was released as the fourth single from the album via digital download on 17 June 2014, through Harvest and Capitol Records. On 8 January 2015, Morrissey informed fans that a 45 RPM vinyl of "The Bullfighter Dies" had been scheduled for a global release by Harvest, but was scrapped at the last minute by Steve Barnett. The B-side was intended to be the original French mix of the song "One of Our Own".

Due to changes in global music consumption, the physical versions of the first four singles from this album were released together as one 10" vinyl.

== Music video ==
The accompanying music video, directed by Natalie Johns, coincided with the release of the digital download. As with the preceding videos from the album, it is presented in spoken word. The spoken word video had previously leaked online on 18 May 2014.

== Critical reception ==
Spin magazine commented on the song, stating that "it's a brief but stirring two minutes, packed with sunny guitar leads and Moz's charming lilt. In short, it's a whole lot less morose than the downcast spoken word video might have led you to believe."

== Personnel ==
- Morrissey – vocals

Additional musicians

- Boz Boorer – guitar
- Jesse Tobias – guitar
- Solomon Walker – bass
- Matthew Walker – drums
- Gustavo Manzur – keyboards

Technical personnel

- Joe Chiccarelli – production
