= World Peace Is None of Your Business (song) =

Single by Morrissey

from the album World Peace Is None of Your Business
- Released: 13 May 2014
- Recorded: La Fabrique in Saint-Rémy-de-Provence, France, February 2014
- Genre: Alternative rock
- Length: 4:21
- Label: Harvest/Capitol
- Songwriter(s): Morrissey, Boz Boorer
- Producer(s): Joe Chiccarelli

Morrissey singles chronology
"Satellite of Love" (2013)	"World Peace Is None of Your Business" (2014)	"Istanbul" (2014)

"World Peace Is None of Your Business" is a song by English singer Morrissey. It was released on 13 May 2014 as the first single from his tenth studio album of the same name (2014), through Harvest and Capitol Records. The single was accompanied by a music video, directed by Natalie Johns. The song was recorded in France with Morrissey's touring band which features guitarists Boz Boorer and Jesse Tobias, bassist Solomon Walker, drummer Matthew Walker and keyboardist Gustavo Manzur and was produced by Joe Chiccarelli, who is known for his production work for Beck and The Strokes.

Due to changes in global music consumption, the physical versions of the first four singles from this album were released together as one 10" vinyl.

The song was previously debuted live on 7 May 2014 at the San Jose Civic Auditorium in San Jose, California.

== Artwork ==
The artwork and the release date of the single was revealed on 12 May 2014. It features "Morrissey dressed in a crisp white T-shirt and blue jeans and hanging out with a dog after writing some graffiti." The artwork has been described as "very Morrissey-esque" and was praised by Pitchfork Media staff writer Evan Minsker.

== Music video ==
The accompanying music video, directed by Natalie Johns, was also released on 13 May 2014. It features Morrissey performing the spoken word rendition of the song over a "jazzy piano backing." Nancy Sinatra also makes a cameo appearance in the video. The spoken word rendition of the song was compared to Radiohead track "Fitter Happier" from OK Computer (1997) and the "Choose Life" monologue in the film, Trainspotting (1996).

== Track listing ==
Digital download

1. "World Peace Is None of Your Business" – 4:21

== Personnel ==
- Morrissey – vocals

Additional musicians

- Boz Boorer – guitar
- Jesse Tobias – guitar
- Solomon Walker – bass
- Matthew Walker – drums
- Gustavo Manzur – keyboards

Technical personnel

- Joe Chiccarelli – production
