= Kiss Me a Lot =

Single by Morrissey

from the album World Peace Is None of Your Business
- Released: 26 March 2015
- Recorded: La Fabrique in Saint-Rémy-de-Provence, France, February 2014
- Genre: Alternative rock
- Length: 4:03
- Label: Atom Factory
- Songwriter(s): Morrissey, Tobias
- Producer(s): Joe Chiccarelli

Morrissey singles chronology
"The Bullfighter Dies" (2014)	"Kiss Me a Lot" (2015)	"Spent the Day in Bed" (2017)

"Kiss Me a Lot" is a song by English singer Morrissey. It is the eighth track on his World Peace Is None of Your Business album and was released as the fifth single off the album via digital download on 26 March 2015, through Atom Factory.

Of the release, Morrissey stated: "I humbly ask for all and any support with this download release, which, has always been waiting in the wings if not for unpleasant circumstances familiar enough not to be repeated here. Thank you to Atom Factory for making this happen, and here's to sound reason, good times, and music that matters."

Furthermore, artwork for the download has been enhanced by Rob English at Atom Factory using a previously unseen photograph taken by Terry Richardson.

On 5 April 2015, the official video for the song was announced on True-To-You, directed by Morrissey's nephew, Sam Esty Rayner. (Rayner had previously appeared as a young James Dean in his uncle's video for the song "Suedehead".)

== Track listing ==
Digital download

1. "Kiss Me a Lot" - 4:03

== Personnel ==
- Morrissey – vocals

Additional musicians

- Boz Boorer – guitar
- Jesse Tobias – guitar
- Solomon Walker – bass
- Matthew Walker – drums
- Gustavo Manzur – keyboards

Production

- Joe Chiccarelli – production
