= Istanbul (Morrissey song) =

Single by Morrissey

from the album World Peace Is None of Your Business
- Released: 20 May 2014
- Recorded: La Fabrique in Saint-Rémy-de-Provence, France, February 2014
- Genre: Alternative rock
- Length: 4:40; 3:20 (radio edit)
- Label: Harvest/Capitol
- Songwriter(s): Morrissey, Boorer
- Producer(s): Joe Chiccarelli

Morrissey singles chronology
"World Peace Is None of Your Business" (2014)	"Istanbul" (2014)	"Earth Is the Loneliest Planet" (2014)

"Istanbul" is a song by English singer Morrissey. It is the fourth track on his World Peace Is None of Your Business album and was released as the second single off the album via digital download on 20 May 2014, through Harvest and Capitol Records.

Due to changes in global music consumption, the physical versions of the first four singles from this album were released together as one 10" vinyl.

Joe Chiccarelli, the album's producer, stated that "Morrissey wanted to evoke the feeling of the hectic and chaotic streets of the city of Istanbul, so he used a cigar-box guitar, a lap steel guitar and a complicated and bussy drum rhythm, plus an actual gong as percussion, as well as vocal samples from a field recording taken in the streets of Istanbul by guitarist Jesse Tobias."

== Music video ==
The accompanying music video, directed by Natalie Johns, was also released on 20 May 2014. As with the previous single, it features Morrissey performing the song in spoken word.

== Track listing ==
Digital download

1. "Istanbul" – 4:40

== Personnel ==
- Morrissey – vocals

Additional musicians

- Boz Boorer – guitar
- Jesse Tobias – guitar
- Solomon Walker – bass
- Matthew Walker – drums
- Gustavo Manzur – keyboards

Technical personnel

- Joe Chiccarelli – production
