= Pregnant for the Last Time =

1991 single by Morrissey

Single by Morrissey
- B-side: "Skin Storm"; "Cosmic Dancer" (live); "Disappointed" (live)
- Released: 15 July 1991
- Genre: Rockabilly
- Length: 2:43
- Label: His Master's Voice
- Songwriters: Morrissey; Mark Nevin
- Producers: Clive Langer; Alan Winstanley

Morrissey singles chronology
"Sing Your Life" (1991)	"Pregnant for the Last Time" (1991)	"My Love Life" (1991)

Professional ratings
Review scores
Source	Rating
AllMusic	3/5 stars

"Pregnant for the Last Time" is a song by the English singer Morrissey, released as a non-album single in July 1991. The song was co-written by Mark E. Nevin, who plays guitar on the track. This was the first time Morrissey worked with guitarist Boz Boorer, who also plays guitar on the track and consistently worked with Morrissey until 2020. The single reached number 25 on the UK Singles Chart. B-side "Skin Storm" was originally written and performed by Bradford, while another B-side, "Cosmic Dancer", is a cover of a T. Rex song.

== Critical reception ==
The single was described in NME as a "lovely little music hall ditty" and "far more sprightly and accessible than most of Kill Uncle" in a very positive review. In a retrospective review, Ned Raggett of AllMusic wrote "The title track itself is very rockabilly-glam, from the tribal drums to the heavy guitar twangs, though the curious lyric keeps it from being a Morrissey classic."

== Live performances ==
The song was only performed live by Morrissey on his 1991 Kill Uncle tour.

== Track listings ==
7-inch vinyl and cassette

1. "Pregnant for the Last Time"
2. "Skin Storm" (Bradford cover)

12-inch vinyl and CD

1. "Pregnant for the Last Time"
2. "Skin Storm" (Bradford cover)
3. "Cosmic Dancer" (T. Rex cover) (live in Utrecht, The Netherlands, 1 May 1991)
4. "Disappointed" (live in Utrecht, The Netherlands, 1 May 1991)

Country	Record label	Format	Catalogue number
UK	His Master's Voice	7-inch vinyl	POP1627
UK	His Master's Voice	12-inch vinyl	12POP1627
UK	His Master's Voice	Compact disc	CDPOP1627
UK	His Master's Voice	Cassette	TCPOP1627

== Personnel ==
- Morrissey – voice
- Mark E. Nevin – guitar
- Boz Boorer – guitar
- Jonny Bridgwood – bass
- Andrew Paresi – drums

== Charts ==
Chart performance for "Pregnant for the Last Time"
Chart (1991)	Peak position
Australia (ARIA)	71
Ireland (IRMA)	9
UK Singles (Official Charts)	25

== See also ==
- Morrissey discography
