= Now My Heart Is Full =

Single by Morrissey

from the album Vauxhall and I
- Released: 23 August 1994
- Genre: Alternative rock
- Length: 4:58
- Label: Sire
- Songwriters: Morrissey, Boz Boorer
- Producer: Steve Lillywhite

Morrissey singles chronology
"Interlude" (1994)	"Now My Heart Is Full" (1994)	"Boxers" (1995)

Professional ratings
Review scores
Source	Rating
AllMusic	3/5 stars

"Now My Heart Is Full" is a song by British singer Morrissey from his fourth solo album Vauxhall and I. The song's refrain of "Dallow, Spicer, Pinkie, Cubitt" references the gangsters from Graham Greene's 1938 novel Brighton Rock and the film of the same name.

In an interview published in Les Inrockuptibles in 1995, Morrissey stated "This song was the definitive expression of my change to adulthood, of my maturity. And, to be honest, I was very happy to be able to sing this text, to have reached this state. After this song I could perfectly retire: I've come full circle."

Phoebe Bridgers named it to her list of five essential Morrissey songs, commenting, "This song best encapsulates Morrissey for me."

== Critical reception ==
Ned Raggett of AllMusic wrote "Morrissey's quiet purr at the start turns into one of his best, most soaring performances by the end."

== Track listings ==
=== Cassette ===
No.	Title	Length
1.	"Now My Heart Is Full"	4:57
2.	"Moon River"	4:43

=== CD ===
No.	Title	Length
1.	"Now My Heart Is Full"	4:57
2.	"Moon River" (extended)	9:38
3.	"Jack the Ripper" (live in Paris 12/12/1992)	4:14
