= Wolventrix =

- Origin: London
- Genres: Indie rock
- Years active: 1999 – present
- Label: Fabrique Records
- Members: Alex Billig (keyboards, backing vocals); Tony Creaton (bass guitar); Tristan Gilchrist (drums); Chris Potter (electric guitar); Tom Walkden (lead vocals, acoustic guitar)
- Website: http://www.wolventrix.com

Wolventrix are an indie rock band based in London, UK, comprising Alex Billig (keyboards, backing vocals), Tony Creaton (bass guitar), Tristan Gilchrist (drums), Chris Potter (electric guitar) and Tom Walkden (lead vocals, acoustic guitar).

Their music has been described as reminiscent of Suede, Conor Oberst and The Divine Comedy among others.

== History ==
The five members met in Oxford in 1999. After various individual stints overseas they were all living in London, England by 2006 where they began to play regular gigs, including support slots for The Electric Soft Parade, Ooberman, and The Wave Pictures. The band signed to Fabrique Records of Vienna and released The Berlin EP in February 2009. The single "Wings" was remixed by Spoonface, Konsorten TM and Kava, the last of which received national airplay on Austria's FM4. Their debut album "Ours Till Dawn" was produced by Victor Gangl in Vienna and released at the end of 2011, receiving strong reviews both in the UK and on the continent. The video for Wanderlust, the second single from the album, was featured on NME.com and placed on rotation by Austrian music channel Go TV. Wolventrix's music has been used in ad campaigns for Die Wien Holding and H&M.

== Discography ==
- The Berlin EP (2009)
- Ours Till Dawn (2011)
- The Berlin EP (re-release) (2019)
