= Make-Up Is a Lie =

2026 studio album by Morrissey

Studio album by Morrissey
- Released: 6 March 2026
- Recorded: January to late 2023
- Studios: La Fabrique Studios in St-Remy, France
- Genres: Alternative rock; pop rock
- Length: 49:48
- Label: Sire
- Producer: Joe Chiccarelli

Morrissey chronology
I Am Not a Dog on a Chain (2020)	Make-Up Is a Lie (2026)	Deluxe Notre-Dame (2026)

Singles from Make-Up Is a Lie
- 1. "Make-Up Is a Lie" Released: 9 January 2026; 2. "Notre-Dame" Released: 6 February 2026; 3. "Amazona" Released: 27 February 2026; 4. "The Monsters of Pig Alley" Released: 6 March 2026; 5. "Kerching Kerching" Released: 16 October 2026; 6. "Zoom Zoom the Little Boy" Released: 16 October 2026

Make-Up Is a Lie is the fourteenth solo album by the English singer Morrissey. The album was released on 6 March 2026.

== Content ==
Morrissey announced the tentative production and release of a new album titled Without Music the World Dies on 8 December 2022. The album was recorded in January and February 2023 at La Fabrique Studios in St-Remy, France, and was produced by Joe Chiccarelli, making it his fifth collaboration with the singer. It was produced outside the bounds of a record contract, as Morrissey had parted ways with his former label Capitol Records in December 2022. The album was initially scheduled to consist of twelve songs, collectively written by Morrissey and members of his band, but this was later reduced to ten songs.

On 20 February 2023, Morrissey announced Without Music the World Dies had been completed. He then offered the album up to any record labels or private investors willing to distribute the finished album.

In December 2024, Morrissey declared: "There are two albums ... The second one was re-recorded in France in late 2023, and given a new title. We scrapped half of the tracks and we recorded six new ones, and so it is not the album from the beginning of 2023". In June 2025, he announced that the album has been renamed to You're Right, It's Time saying "The second album will be released first". He also recorded a cover of Roxy Music's "Amazona". In the same interview, You're Right, It's Time was said to be scheduled for release in September 2025.

On 9 January 2026, it was announced Morrissey had returned to Sire Records to release the album, now entitled Make-Up Is a Lie, preceded by a single of the same name.

When first played live, the song "Notre-Dame" was sung with the words: "Before investigations, they said: 'This is not terrorism!'." The Independent wrote that it echoed a "right-wing conspiracy theory", claiming that the 2019 fire at Notre-Dame de Paris was "deliberate" and part of "anti-Christian attacks".

On March 6, the album's release day, Morrissey released a music video for "The Monsters of Pig Alley". An EP, Deluxe Notre-Dame, followed, with two further 7" vinyl singles - "Kerching Kerching" and "Zoom Zoom the Little Boy" - being released in October 2026.

== Critical reception ==
Professional ratings
Aggregate scores
Source	Rating
Metacritic	59/100
Review scores
Source	Rating
The Guardian	2/5 stars
The Independent	3/5 stars
Mojo	4/5 stars
Paste	D−
Pitchfork	6.1/10
PopMatters	7/10
Record Collector	3/5 stars
Rolling Stone	2.5/5 stars
The Times	2/5 stars
Uncut	3.5/5 stars

Make-Up Is a Lie received mixed reviews upon release. On Metacritic, which assigns a normalised rating out of 100 to reviews from mainstream publications, Make-up Is a Lie received an average score of 59 based on 13 reviews, indicating "mixed or average reviews".

== Track listing ==
Make-Up Is a Lie track listing
No.	Title	Writer(s)	Length
1.	"You're Right, It's Time"	Morrissey; Camila Grey	3:48
2.	"Make-Up Is a Lie"	Morrissey; Grey	3:09
3.	"Notre-Dame"	Morrissey; Alain Whyte	4:08
4.	"Amazona"	Bryan Ferry; Phil Manzanera	4:11
5.	"Headache"	Morrissey; Gustavo Manzur	4:20
6.	"Boulevard"	Morrissey; Whyte	5:40
7.	"Zoom Zoom the Little Boy"	Morrissey; Jesse Tobias	3:12
8.	"The Night Pop Dropped"	Morrissey; Tobias	4:24
9.	"Kerching Kerching"	Morrissey; Grey	2:53
10.	"Lester Bangs"	Morrissey; Grey	3:42
11.	"Many Icebergs Ago"	Morrissey; Manzur	5:24
12.	"The Monsters of Pig Alley"	Morrissey; Whyte	4:57
Total length:			49:48

Deluxe edition bonus tracks
No.	Title	Writer(s)	Length
13.	"Hello Hell"	Morrissey; Whyte	3:56
14.	"Happy New Tears"	Morrissey; Whyte	3:34

== Personnel ==
Personnel as given listed inside the record.

- Morrissey – vocal, lyrics, vocal melodies

=== Additional personnel ===
- Camila Grey – keyboards, programming, backing vocal on "Kerching Kerching"
- Carmen Vandenberg – electric guitar, acoustic guitar on "Boulevard", "Lester Bangs", and "The Monsters of Pig Alley"
- Juan Galeano – bass; Prophet synth, programming, and keyboards on "Notre Dame", upright bass on "Headache", "Boulevard", and "Many Icebergs Ago", bowed bass on "Boulevard", backing vocal on "Lester Bangs"
- Brendan Buckley – drums
- Jesse Tobias – electric guitar, acoustic guitar, bass on "Headache", electric sitar on "Zoom Zoom the Little Boy", bass 6 on "Kerching Kerching", mandolin on "Many Icebergs Ago"
- Alain Whyte – backing vocal on "Notre Dame", guitars on "Headache", electric guitar on "Zoom Zoom the Little Boy"
- Gustavo Manzur – keyboards on "Headache" and "The Night Pop Dropped"
- Ambroise Sage – string arrangement on "Notre Dame"
- Keren Ann - backing vocal on "Zoom Zoom the Little Boy" and "The Monsters of Pig Alley"

=== Production ===
- Joe Chiccarelli – production ,engineering
- Bill Mims – engineering
- Patrick Dillett – mixing

== Charts ==
Chart performance for Make-Up Is a Lie
Chart (2026)	Peak position
Austrian Albums (Ö3 Austria)	20
Belgian Albums (Ultratop Flanders)	12
Belgian Albums (Ultratop Wallonia)	8
Dutch Albums (Album Top 100)	48
French Albums (SNEP)	42
French Rock & Metal Albums (SNEP)	2
German Albums (Offizielle Top 100)	9
German Rock & Metal Albums (Offizielle Top 100)	3
Greek Albums (IFPI)	48
Hungarian Albums (MAHASZ)	24
Irish Albums (Official Charts)	27
Japanese Rock Albums (Oricon)	17
Japanese Western Albums (Oricon)	13
Norwegian Physical Albums (IFPI Norge)	4
Portuguese Albums (AFP)	163
Scottish Albums (Official Charts)	2
Swedish Physical Albums (Sverigetopplistan)	4
Swiss Albums (Schweizer Hitparade)	15
UK Albums (Official Charts)	3
US Top Album Sales (Billboard)	14
