= California Son =

Studio album by Morrissey
- Released: 24 May 2019
- Recorded: July–August 2018
- Studio: Sunset Sound, Hollywood, California
- Length: 40:08
- Label: étienne, BMG
- Producer: Joe Chiccarelli

Morrissey chronology
Low in High School (2017)	California Son (2019)	I Am Not a Dog on a Chain (2020)

Singles from California Son
- 1. "Wedding Bell Blues" Released: 8 April 2019

California Son is the twelfth solo studio album by English singer Morrissey. Released on 24 May 2019 on the singer's label étienne and licensed on BMG, the album is a collection of cover versions. The single "Wedding Bell Blues", initially written and sung by Laura Nyro in 1966, featured Billie Joe Armstrong of Green Day on backing vocals.

Recorded in 2018, the album was produced by Joe Chiccarelli, a frequent collaborator of Morrissey. California Son was released to generally mixed or average reviews.

== Background ==
In September 2018, photographs of Morrissey and American singer-songwriter LP were uploaded to the former's website Morrissey Central with a caption mentioning a "new album" and crediting LP as a collaborator on two tracks. On 5 December 2018, the album title, California Son, its track list, and its producer, Joe Chiccarelli, were officially announced. Chiccarelli had produced Morrissey's two previous studio albums World Peace Is None of Your Business and Low in High School. The release date of 24 May 2019 and the artwork were revealed in February 2019.

== Promotion ==
=== Singles ===
"It's Over" featuring LP was released as a promotional single on 26 February 2019. A promotional CD was released exclusively in France.

"Wedding Bell Blues" featuring Billie Joe Armstrong of Green Day was released as a single on 8 April 2019. It was later made available as a yellow 7" vinyl on 10 May 2019, with an artwork designed by Morrissey using a still from the film Ride the Wild Surf (1964) showing Fabian.

=== Live performances ===
From 2 May to 11 May 2019, Morrissey performed a seven-day Broadway residency at the Lunt-Fontanne Theater. The setlist included material from California Son.

On 13 May 2019, Morrissey performed "Morning Starship" on The Tonight Show Starring Jimmy Fallon. His appearance sparked controversy due to a pin he was wearing that depicted the logo of British far-right party For Britain.

== Critical reception ==
Professional ratings
Aggregate scores
Source	Rating
Metacritic	57/100
Review scores
Source	Rating
AllMusic	3/5 stars
The A.V. Club	B
Exclaim!	1/10
The Independent	2/5 stars
Mojo	3/5 stars
NME	2/5 stars
Pitchfork	5.9/10
Rolling Stone	3.5/5 stars
Variety	B+
Uncut	7/10

On Metacritic, which assigns a normalised rating out of 100 to reviews from mainstream publications, California Son received an average score of 57 based on 15 reviews, indicating "mixed or average reviews".

In a positive review for The Telegraph, Neil McCormick rated California Son four out of five stars and described it as "sumptuous", writing that "if a great cover version should reveal new dimensions in both song and singer, then this album is filled with them". Josh Modell of The A.V. Club gave the album a B rating and wrote that "without the baggage of his political views—which is where the letter grade on this review comes from—California Son would be a worthy addition to a mostly stellar catalog, offering insight into a great singer and lyricist's taste and breathing new life into mostly forgotten songs", adding that "his music taste is impeccable". He particularly praised Morrissey's "fantastically bombastic" version of "It's Over". Writing for Variety, A. D. Amorosi opined that "Morrissey hasn't sounded this passionately committed to song — any song — since 2004's You Are the Quarry" and praised his "impactful, clarion-clear renditions". However, he described California Son as "epically overproduced" and considered some of the song choices "odd" in regard to the political views expressed by the singer in the years preceding the album's release.

In a negative review for The Guardian, Laura Snapes felt that Morrissey's political views made it "impossible to hear a number of the covers on California Son in anything but a chilling light". Although she noted "vaguely intriguing gender wrinkles", she questioned his motivation to record "protest-adjacent covers" and criticised both his vocal performance and the production of the album. Rating the album 1/10, Oliver Thompson of Exclaim! echoed Snapes's comments, viewing the song choices as "completely opposed" to Morrissey's political opinions and writing that "California Son displays an ambiguity that reeks of grotesque hypocrisy". He also panned the "lack of finesse in his vocals" and the production of the album, which he described as "the definition of clinical".

== Track listing ==
No.	Title	Writer(s)	Original artist	Length
1.	"Morning Starship"	Jobriath	Jobriath	3:29
2.	"Don't Interrupt the Sorrow"	Joni Mitchell	Joni Mitchell	4:06
3.	"Only a Pawn in Their Game"	Bob Dylan	Bob Dylan	3:46
4.	"Suffer the Little Children"	Buffy Sainte-Marie	Buffy Sainte-Marie	3:30
5.	"Days of Decision"	Phil Ochs	Phil Ochs	2:56
6.	"It's Over"	Roy Orbison; Bill Dees	Roy Orbison	2:52
7.	"Wedding Bell Blues"	Laura Nyro	Laura Nyro	2:56
8.	"Loneliness Remembers What Happiness Forgets"	Burt Bacharach; Hal David	Allison Durbin	2:10
9.	"Lady Willpower"	Jerry Fuller	Gary Puckett & The Union Gap	3:06
10.	"When You Close Your Eyes"	Carly Simon; Billy Mernit	Carly Simon	3:30
11.	"Lenny's Tune"	Tim Hardin	Nico	3:30
12.	"Some Say I Got Devil"	Melanie Safka	Melanie	4:09
Total length:				39:57

== Personnel ==
Credits adapted from the liner notes.

- Morrissey – lead vocals
- Steve Aho – orchestration, music copying, musician contractor (all for tracks 8 and 9)
- Chris Allgood – mastering
- Billie Joe Armstrong – backing vocals (track 7)
- Boz Boorer – acoustic guitar (tracks 1, 3, 4, 5, 8), electric rhythm guitar (track 3), electric guitar (track 10), mandolin (track 11)
- Brigette Bryant – group vocals (track 7)
- Joe Chiccarelli – production, recording, mixing, stylophone (track 1), drum programming (track 5)
- Ed Droste^{[a]} – backing vocals (track 3)
- Chris Dugan – additional engineering
- Ariel Engle – backing vocals (track 2)
- Lars Fox – digital editing
- Ryan Freeland – mixing
- Sameer Gadhia – backing vocals (track 5)
- Petra Haden – backing vocals (track 10)
- Sean Hurley – bass (tracks 6, 8)
- Little Willie Iniesta – dog barking/vocals (track 10)
- Tim Kvasnosky – additional engineering
- Emily Lazar – mastering
- Dave Levita – acoustic guitar
- Liam Lynch – art and design
- LP – additional vocals (track 6)
- Roger Manning – synthesisers, keyboards, string arrangement (track 8), horn arrangement (tracks 8, 9), backing vocals (track 9), electric piano
- Gustavo Manzur – synthesisers (tracks 1, 9), accordion (track 3)
- Arnold McCuller – group vocals (track 7)
- Bill Mims – recording
- Michael Muller – photography (front cover)
- Lydia Night – backing vocals (track 7)
- Marcus Paquin – additional engineering
- Valerie Pinkston – group vocals (track 7)
- Zac Rae – organ, upright piano, keyboards (track 5, 12)
- Ken Sluiter – mixing
- Jesse Tobias – electric guitar, 12-string electric guitar, slide guitar, electric rhythm guitar, fuzz guitar, electric baritone guitar, backbeat guitar, acoustic guitar (track 6), ebow guitar
- Matthew Ira Walker – drums, drum programming (track 3, 10)

Notes

- ^{^a} On the limited edition vinyl release, Ed Droste is incorrectly credited as Ed Drooste.

== Charts ==
Chart performance for California Sun
Chart (2019)	Peak position
Austrian Albums (Ö3 Austria)	32
Belgian Albums (Ultratop Flanders)	18
Belgian Albums (Ultratop Wallonia)	47
Czech Albums (ČNS IFPI)	99
Dutch Albums (Album Top 100)	97
French Albums (SNEP)	66
German Albums (Offizielle Top 100)	13
Irish Albums (IRMA)	27
Italian Albums (FIMI)	58
Scottish Albums (OCC)	2
Spanish Albums (PROMUSICAE)	29
Swiss Albums (Schweizer Hitparade)	32
UK Albums (OCC)	4
US Billboard 200	95
