= Only a Pawn in Their Game =

Song by Bob Dylan

from the album The Times They Are a-Changin'
- Released: January 13, 1964
- Recorded: August 7, 1963
- Genre: Folk; blues
- Length: 3:33
- Label: Columbia
- Songwriter: Bob Dylan
- Producer: Tom Wilson

"Only a Pawn in Their Game" is a song written by Bob Dylan about the assassination of civil rights activist Medgar Evers in Jackson, Mississippi, on June 12, 1963. Showing support for African-Americans during the American Civil Rights Movement, the song was released on Dylan's The Times They Are a-Changin' album in 1964.

== Lyrics ==
The lyrics attribute blame for the killing and other racial violence to the rich white politicians and authorities who manipulated poor whites into directing their anger and hatred at black people. The song suggests that Evers's killer does not deserve to be remembered by name in the annals of history, unlike the man he murdered ("They lowered him down as a king"), because he was "only a pawn in their game."

== Recording and performances ==
Dylan first performed "Only a Pawn in Their Game" at a voter registration rally in Greenwood, Mississippi on July 6, 1963, at the request of Pete Seeger. He sang it again at the Newport Folk Festival on 26 July. Two weeks later, on August 7, he recorded several takes of the song at Columbia's studios in New York City, selecting the initial attempt for release on The Times They Are a-Changin'.

Dylan performed the song at the March on Washington for Jobs and Freedom on August 28, 1963, where Martin Luther King Jr. gave his "I Have a Dream" speech. Dylan stated of the experience, in the documentary No Direction Home, "I looked up from the podium and I thought to myself, 'I've never seen such a large crowd.' I was up close when King was giving that speech. To this day, it still affects me in a profound way." Nevertheless, he received only scattered applause for the song, reflecting that many marchers did not agree with the sentiments of the song which exonerate Evers's murderer as a poor white man manipulated by race-baiting politicians and the injustices of the social system.

The lyrics actually reiterate the claim that the murderer "can't be blamed. He's only a pawn in their game." In fact, the state twice prosecuted the murderer in 1964, but each time the all white jury failed to reach a verdict. Dylan no longer played the song after October 1964. In 1969 the murderer had the original indictment dismissed. However, when these first trials were shown to be held unfairly and with new evidence available the murderer was eventually found guilty on February 5, 1994.

== In popular culture ==
Hip hop group Public Enemy reference it in their 2007 Dylan tribute song "Long and Whining Road": "Only a pawn in the game, chastised for naming names / What was said and who said it, anti-nothing so forget it".

In August 2020, John Mellencamp released the song "A Pawn in the White Man's Game" to his website along with a video to YouTube. The song was a re-working of "Only a Pawn in Their Game" with new lyrics that reflected the racial conflicts in the U.S. that followed in the wake of the murder of George Floyd while in custody of Minneapolis police officers. The video, which included a warning that it might be seen as "inappropriate for some viewers", featured footage of protesters and police clashing violently in 2020 and 1968. YouTube eventually removed the video for violating their community guidelines.

Morrissey recorded the song for his 2019 cover album California Son.

== See also ==
- Civil rights movement in popular culture
