= Hold On to Your Friends =

Single by Morrissey

from the album Vauxhall and I
- B-side: "Moon River"
- Released: 30 May 1994
- Recorded: June–August 1993
- Genre: Alternative rock
- Length: 4:02
- Label: Parlophone (UK)
- Songwriters: Morrissey, Alain Whyte
- Producer: Steve Lillywhite

Morrissey singles chronology
"The More You Ignore Me, the Closer I Get" (1994)	"Hold On to Your Friends" (1994)	"Interlude" (1994)

"Hold On to Your Friends" is a song by Morrissey, released as a single in May 1994. It was the second single taken from the number 1 album Vauxhall and I. Morrissey claimed, "It was written about somebody I know, in relation of their treatment towards me." Morrissey ranked it as his eleventh best solo single in a 2026 post.

Reaching number 48 in the UK Singles Chart, the single became Morrissey's lowest charting single until "Glamorous Glue" in 2011, which reached number 69.

== Track listings ==
=== 7" vinyl and cassette ===
1. "Hold On to Your Friends"
2. "Moon River"

=== 12" vinyl and CD ===
1. "Hold On to Your Friends"
2. "Moon River" (extended version)

Country	Record label	Format	Catalogue number
UK	Parlophone	7" vinyl	R6383
UK	Parlophone	12" vinyl	12R6383
UK	Parlophone	Compact disc	CDR6383
UK	Parlophone	Cassette	TCR6383

== Musicians ==
- Morrissey: voice
- Alain Whyte: guitar
- Boz Boorer: guitar
- Jonny Bridgwood: bass guitar
- Woodie Taylor: drums

== Reception ==
Ned Raggett of AllMusic thought the song featured a strong performance from the group but was "not one of the album's immediately strongest points", although it "isn't a bad listen at all." He was more impressed by the cover version of Moon River on the B-side which had a "surprisingly affecting" performance from Morrissey and a good production.

== Live performances ==
The song was performed live by Morrissey on his 1995 and 1997 tours.
