= I Am Not a Dog on a Chain =

Studio album by Morrissey
- Released: 20 March 2020
- Recorded: 2019
- Studio: Studio La Fabrique, Saint-Rémy-de-Provence, France; Sunset Sound, Hollywood
- Genre: Alternative rock; pop rock
- Length: 49:26
- Label: BMG
- Producer: Joe Chiccarelli

Morrissey chronology
California Son (2019)	I Am Not a Dog on a Chain (2020)	Make-Up Is a Lie (2026)

Singles from I Am Not a Dog on a Chain
- 1. "Bobby, Don't You Think They Know?" Released: 10 January 2020; 2. "Love Is On Its Way Out" Released: 31 January 2020; 3. "Knockabout World" Released: 21 February 2020

I Am Not a Dog on a Chain is the thirteenth solo studio album by Morrissey, released through BMG on 20 March 2020. It is Morrissey's first album of original material since 2017's Low in High School. It was produced by Joe Chiccarelli, and lead single "Bobby, Don't You Think They Know?" features vocals from Thelma Houston.

== Recording and promotion ==
The album was produced by Joe Chiccarelli and recorded at Studio La Fabrique in Saint-Rémy-de-Provence, France, as well as Sunset Sound in Hollywood.

In a press release, Morrissey called the album "the very best of me" and "too good to be true [...] too true to be considered good". Producer Joe Chiccarelli described it as Morrissey's "boldest and most adventurous album yet", claiming that he has "pushed the boundaries yet again – both musically and lyrically".

== Critical reception ==
Professional ratings
Aggregate scores
Source	Rating
Metacritic	62/100
Review scores
Source	Rating
The A.V. Club	B−
AllMusic	3.5/5 stars
The Independent	2/5 stars
NME	3/5 stars
Pitchfork	6.1/10
The Telegraph	4/5 stars

I Am Not a Dog on a Chain currently holds a score of 62 out of 100 - indicating "generally favourable" reviews - on review aggregator Metacritic, based on 13 reviews. Josh Modell of The A.V. Club gave the album a B− and felt that the lyrical content was the weakest but that Morrissey displayed songcraft and "a great vocal performance". The editorial staff of AllMusic gave the album 3.5 out of five stars, with reviewer Stephen Thomas Erlewine summing up his review by calling the album "one of the better latter-day Morrissey records" but decrying how "placid and complacent he's been for the better part of a decade". Mina Tavakoli of Pitchfork rated the album 6.1 out of 10 and called it "frequently ridiculous, mildly captivating, and occasionally repetitive, pocked by moments of goofiness that come from the runoff of a man eager to chase old miseries and find new ones to berate".

Writing for The Independent, Jake Cudsi rated the album two out of five stars, opining that it "has its moments, but they are brief and virtually lost amid the more experimental forays". Laura Snapes of The Guardian also gave the album two out of five stars, judging that Morrissey plays the "victim" and is "often lost among the strident music as he hectors people afraid to be themselves", though his "coyness undermines his apparent glee as a truth-teller". Associated Press wrote: "Morrissey delivers his best musical performance in years"

== Track listing ==
No.	Title	Writer(s)	Length
1.	"Jim Jim Falls"	Morrissey, Jesse Tobias	3:44
2.	"Love Is on Its Way Out"	Morrissey, Gustavo Manzur	3:15
3.	"Bobby, Don't You Think They Know?"	Morrissey, Manzur	5:46
4.	"I Am Not a Dog on a Chain"	Morrissey, Tobias	3:53
5.	"What Kind of People Live in These Houses?"	Morrissey, Tobias	3:42
6.	"Knockabout World"	Morrissey, Tobias	3:25
7.	"Darling, I Hug a Pillow"	Morrissey, Mando Lopez	4:47
8.	"Once I Saw the River Clean"	Morrissey, Tobias	4:20
9.	"The Truth About Ruth"	Morrissey, Manzur	3:45
10.	"The Secret of Music"	Morrissey, Lopez	7:52
11.	"My Hurling Days Are Done"	Morrissey, Tobias	5:01
Total length:			49:26

== Personnel ==
- Morrissey – vocals (all tracks)

Additional musicians

- Steve Aho – orchestration (track 6), conductor (track 6), contractor (track 6)
- Boz Boorer – string arrangements (track 1), saxophone solo (track 3), acoustic guitar (tracks 4, 8, 11), electric guitar (track 7), mandolin (tracks 8, 9), zither (track 9), clarinet (track 10)
- Joe Chiccarelli – production, engineering, drum programming (tracks 1, 10, 11), additional synthesizer (track 10)
- Daniel Cayotte – recitation (track 10)
- Sally Chae – backing vocals (track 7)
- Mike Daly – drum programming and synthesizer (track 8)
- Glendale Tab & Apple Choir – kids choir (track 11)
- Thelma Houston – vocals (track 3)
- Sean Hurley – bass guitar (track 5)
- Victor Indrizzo – drums (track 5)
- Greg Leisz – pedal steel guitar (track 5)
- Danny Levin – trumpet (track 7)
- Mando Lopez – bass guitar (tracks 1–4, 6–8, 10, 11), bass solo (track 8)
- Roger Manning – harmonium (track 9), Mellotron (track 2), organ (track 9), piano (track 11), string and horn arrangements (track 6), synthesizer (tracks 1, 3–6, 8, 10, 11), backing vocals (tracks 5, 6, 11)
- Gustavo Manzur – drum programming (track 2), nylon string guitar (track 2), Mellotron (track 11), piano (tracks 1, 3, 9), synthesizer (tracks 2, 6), backing vocals (track 2), accordion (track 10)
- Karla Manzur – backing vocals (track 2)
- Rose Mary – laughing (track 10)
- David Ralicke – saxophone (track 3)
- Bridget Regan – fiddle (track 8)
- Megan Sluiter – laughing (track 10)
- Jesse Tobias – acoustic guitars (tracks 5, 11), electric guitars (tracks 1–9, 11), recitation (track 10), electric sitar (track 1), guitar solo (track 6), cigar box guitar (track 10)
- Matt Walker – drums (tracks 1–4, 6–11), percussion (tracks 3–7, 9, 11)

Technical personnel

- John Fekner – photography
- Miro La Gagioia – assistant engineering
- Liam Lynch – artwork, design
- Ken Sluiter – mixing
- Chris Stewart – cover photo
- Jose Vergara – photography
- Emily Lazar – mastering engineering
- Chris Allgood – assistant mastering engineering

== Charts ==
Chart performance for I Am Not a Dog on a Chain
Chart (2020)	Peak position
Austrian Albums (Ö3 Austria)	32
Belgian Albums (Ultratop Flanders)	80
Dutch Albums (Album Top 100)	80
French Albums (SNEP)	117
German Albums (Offizielle Top 100)	13
Irish Albums (Official Charts)	47
Italian Albums (FIMI)	89
Norwegian Vinyl Albums (VG-lista)	1
Portuguese Albums (AFP)	12
Scottish Albums (Official Charts)	1
Spanish Albums (Promusicae)	7
Swiss Albums (Schweizer Hitparade)	56
UK Albums (Official Charts)	3
UK Independent Albums (Official Charts)	1
US Independent Albums (Billboard)	44

== See also ==
- List of 2020 albums
