= World Peace Is None of Your Business =

Studio album by Morrissey
- Released: 15 July 2014
- Recorded: La Fabrique in Saint-Rémy-de-Provence, France, February 2014
- Genre: Alternative rock; pop rock
- Length: 54:35
- Label: Harvest; Capitol
- Producer: Joe Chiccarelli

Morrissey chronology
Very Best of Morrissey (2011)	World Peace Is None of Your Business (2014)	Low in High School (2017)

Singles from World Peace Is None of Your Business
- 1. "World Peace Is None of Your Business" Released: 13 May 2014; 2. "Istanbul" Released: 20 May 2014; 3. "Earth Is the Loneliest Planet" Released: 3 June 2014; 4. "The Bullfighter Dies" Released: 17 June 2014; 5. "Kiss Me a Lot" Released: 26 March 2015

World Peace Is None of Your Business is the tenth solo studio album by the English rock singer Morrissey, recorded in February 2014 and released on 15 July 2014. It was produced by Joe Chiccarelli and was distributed by record label Harvest. The album entered at number 2 on the UK Albums Chart and peaked in the US at number 14 on the Billboard 200.

== Recording and cover ==
World Peace Is None of Your Business was recorded at La Fabrique in Saint-Rémy-de-Provence in France during February 2014 in a studio where Nick Cave had also worked.

The album's cover features an image of Morrissey crouching down and offering a pen to a chocolate Labrador.

== Promotion ==
The album's lead single, "World Peace Is None of Your Business", was released on 13 May 2014, alongside an accompanying music video featuring Nancy Sinatra next to Morrissey performing the song in spoken word. On 20 May a second spoken word video was then released for the album's second single, "Istanbul". Purchasers who pre-ordered the album received a free mp3 download of the song. On 3 June the digital download and spoken word video for the third single, "Earth Is the Loneliest Planet", was made available. The video features Pamela Anderson. On 17 June the studio version and spoken word video of "The Bullfighter Dies", the fourth single, was put on Morrissey's official YouTube channel. The spoken word video had previously leaked online on 18 May. In addition to the four singles, "Kick the Bride Down the Aisle" debuted live prior to the album's official release.

On 7 July 2014 a four-track 10" vinyl EP was released, featuring the four singles, for Record Store Day.

== Release and promotion ==
World Peace Is None of Your Business was released on 15 July 2014 by record label Harvest.

A Deluxe Edition was also released with more material. Of these other tracks, "Scandinavia" had been played live many times in 2011 and 2012, and also performed as part of the Studio in Session bonus feature on the Morrissey: 25 Live DVD and Blu-ray release. "Art-hounds" had been played live only once, on 7 August 2011. The four spoken word videos are available in audio form on a Japanese deluxe version, as well as the other 18 tracks.

In 2021, Morrissey himself appeared to rank the album as the best of his career.

=== Harvest Records controversy ===
On 20 August 2014 Morrissey announced that, due to disagreements with his record label Harvest, the album would be dropped only three weeks after its release.

On 8 January 2015, Morrissey advised fans that a 45 of "The Bullfighter Dies" was scheduled for a global release by Harvest, but was scrapped by Steve Barnett at the last minute. The B-side was to be the original French mix of the song "One of Our Own". Further vinyl singles, including "Istanbul", "Kiss Me a Lot" and "Neal Cassady Drops Dead" were to include other French mixes of several songs as their B-sides: "Scandinavia", "Smiler with Knife" and "Art-hounds", and were available to pre-order from amazon.fr. However, these were also presumably scrapped. The album was still officially available for digital download via online music stores, but was removed at a later date.

== Reception ==
Professional ratings
Aggregate scores
Source	Rating
Metacritic	70/100
Review scores
Source	Rating
AllMusic	3.5/5 stars
The A.V. Club	C−
Billboard	77/100
The Guardian	4/5 stars
Mojo	4/5 stars
NME	9/10
The Observer	4/5 stars
Pitchfork	5.9/10
Rolling Stone	3.5/5 stars
Spin	7/10

At Metacritic, which assigns a weighted average score out of 100 to reviews and ratings from mainstream critics, the album has received a metascore of 70, based on 36 reviews which indicates 'Generally favorable reviews".

In political magazine National Review and in a review titled "World Summit" Armond White wrote that "Morrissey challenges pop and political orthodoxies." Alexis Petridis concluded a four of five star review for The Guardian with "Not as great as you might have hoped, but far better than you might have feared, a little more reliant on others than a man who ended his Autobiography claiming that "I have never had anything in my life that I did not make for myself" might care to admit, World Peace Is None of Your Business may be as good as it gets at this stage in his career, which is good enough." In a more mixed review for Clash Magazine Benji Taylor wrote "though the bleakly beautiful is still there, the flashes are sporadic." Pitchfork gave an average rating saying, "At times the intricate arrangements come across as a means of covering up unmemorable songwriting". In Truck & Driver's regular music reviews, Shaun Connors concluded one of five star assessment with "Lyrically, with his self-absorbed anti-views so all-prevalent in the alternative universe Morrissey inhabits, is it any surprise this collection of rants to [bad] music covers such cheerful events as a bullfighter dying and a student’s suicide? Maybe the latter listened to this album once too often…"

== Track listing ==
No.	Title	Writer(s)	Length
1.	"World Peace Is None of Your Business"	Morrissey, Boz Boorer	4:21
2.	"Neal Cassady Drops Dead"	Morrissey, Gustavo Manzur	4:02
3.	"I'm Not a Man"	Morrissey, Jesse Tobias	7:50
4.	"Istanbul"	Morrissey, Boorer	4:40
5.	"Earth Is the Loneliest Planet"	Morrissey, Manzur	3:38
6.	"Staircase at the University"	Morrissey, Boorer	5:30
7.	"The Bullfighter Dies"	Morrissey, Tobias	2:05
8.	"Kiss Me a Lot"	Morrissey, Tobias	4:03
9.	"Smiler with Knife"	Morrissey, Tobias	5:13
10.	"Kick the Bride Down the Aisle"	Morrissey, Tobias	5:18
11.	"Mountjoy"	Morrissey, Boorer	5:08
12.	"Oboe Concerto"	Morrissey, Boorer	4:07
Total length:			54:35

Deluxe edition bonus tracks
No.	Title	Writer(s)	Length
13.	"Scandinavia"	Morrissey, Boorer	3:34
14.	"One of Our Own"	Morrissey, Manzur	3:33
15.	"Drag the River"	Morrissey, Boorer	4:40
16.	"Forgive Someone"	Morrissey, Tobias	3:10
17.	"Julie in the Weeds"	Morrissey, Boorer	3:59
18.	"Art-Hounds"	Morrissey, Boorer	5:06
Total length:			78:37

== Personnel ==
- Morrissey – lead vocals

Additional personnel

- Boz Boorer – guitar, QChord, clarinet, sax
- Jesse Tobias – guitars
- Solomon Walker – bass guitar
- Matt Walker – drums, tubular bells, percussion
- Gustavo Manzur – keyboards, piano, organ, synths, trumpet, accordion, flamenco guitar, didgeridoo, QChord, backing vocals
- Kristeen Young – backing vocals

Technical

- Joe Chiccarelli – production, mixing
- Ken Sluiter – mixing
- Bob Ludwig – mastering

== Charts ==
=== Weekly charts ===
Chart (2014)	Peak position
Australian Albums (ARIA)	58
Austrian Albums (Ö3 Austria)	17
Belgian Albums (Ultratop Wallonia)	13
Belgian Albums (Ultratop Flanders)	7
Danish Albums (Hitlisten)	2
French Albums (SNEP)	53
Dutch Albums (Album Top 100)	28
German Albums (Offizielle Top 100)	8
Irish Albums (IRMA)	4
Italian Albums (FIMI)	21
Scottish Albums (OCC)	5
Swedish Albums (Sverigetopplistan)	29
Swiss Albums (Schweizer Hitparade)	30
UK Albums (OCC)	2
UK Album Downloads (OCC)	7
US Billboard 200	14
US Top Rock Albums (Billboard)	3

=== Year-end charts ===
Chart (2014)	Position
Belgian Albums (Ultratop Flanders)	181

== Certifications and sales ==
Certifications and sales for World Peace Is None of Your Business
Region	Certification	Certified units/sales
United States	—	25,000
