= Solomon Walker =

American bass guitarist

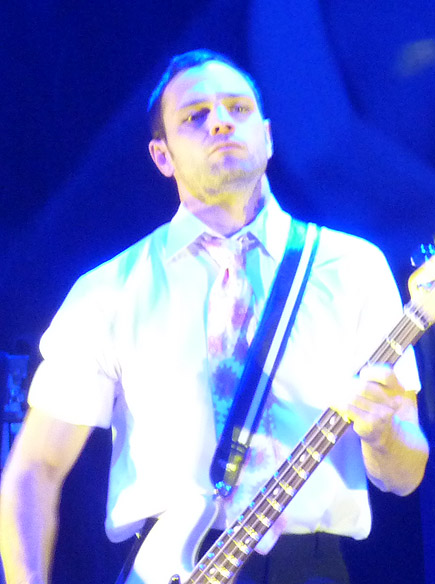
Walker in 2011

Solomon Walker is an American bass guitarist. From 2007 to 2014, again in 2021 and since 2024, he played with Morrissey and appears on his albums Years of Refusal and World Peace Is None of Your Business. From 2018 to 2024, he was a member of the Bryan Adams band.

== Biography ==
Walker is a native of Wilmette, Illinois. He is the brother of Matt Walker, a drummer. He began playing electric and upright bass at age 12.

=== Career ===
Early in his career, Walker was a member of the groups Year of the Rabbit, The Joy Circuit, and Cupcakes (1996-2000).

From 2007 to 2014, Walker was a member of Morrisey's band. In 2012, he performed with Morrissey on Late Night with Jimmy Fallon. In 2013, Walker starred in the Morrissey documentary about their tour in Morrissey: 25 Live, which received mixed reviews. On November 6, 2014, Morrisey announced that Walker was granted a leave of absence from the band, for "compassionate reasons".

In 2011, he toured with Liz Phair.

In 2018, Walker joined the Bryan Adams band. In 2022, he appeared in the music video for the song "Kick Ass".

In 2023, he helped on production of a single by Evidence of a Struggle.

== Personal life ==
Walker relocated to West Hollywood, California, in 2001.
