= Wildwood (film) =

2026 animated film by Travis Knight

- Theatrical release poster
- Directed by: Travis Knight
- Screenplay by: Chris Butler
- Based on: Wildwood by: Colin Meloy; Carson Ellis
- Produced by: Travis Knight; Sam Wilson
- Starring: Carey Mulligan; Peyton Elizabeth Lee; Jacob Tremblay; Richard E. Grant; Awkwafina; Amandla Stenberg; Tom Waits; Charlie Day; Blythe Danner; Arthur Knight; Angela Bassett; Mahershala Ali
- Cinematography: Caleb Deschanel
- Edited by: Christopher Murrie-Green
- Music by: Dario Marianelli
- Production company: Laika
- Distributed by: Fathom Entertainment
- Release dates: October 11, 2026 (BFI); October 23, 2026 (United States)
- Running time: 132 minutes
- Country: United States
- Language: English
- Budget: $100 million
- Box office: $75 million

Wildwood is a 2026 American stop-motion animated fantasy film directed by Travis Knight and written by Chris Butler, based on the 2011 novel of the same name written by Colin Meloy and illustrated by Carson Ellis. Produced by Laika, the film stars Carey Mulligan, Peyton Elizabeth Lee, Jacob Tremblay, Richard E. Grant, Awkwafina, Amandla Stenberg, Tom Waits, Charlie Day, Blythe Danner, Arthur Knight, Angela Bassett, and Mahershala Ali. In the film, a teenage girl named Prue (Lee) and her classmate Curtis (Tremblay), in search of her kidnapped baby brother, venture into an enchanted forest on the brink of war, where they encounter Alexandra (Mulligan), an outcast with a mysterious and sordid past following the tragic loss of her son.

Just weeks after the release of Meloy's novel, in September 2011, Laika announced plans to adapt Wildwood as an animated feature. Production was confirmed in September 2021, with Knight directing and co-producing with Arianne Sutner, and Butler writing the script. Most of the cast was revealed in August 2022. Production took place at Laika's facility studio in Hillsboro, Oregon, with Caleb Deschanel serving as the cinematographer.

Wildwood premiered at the BFI London Film Festival on October 11, 2026, and was released in the United States by Fathom Entertainment on October 23, 2026. With a theatrical runtime of 132 minutes, it is the longest stop-motion-animated film by run-time and Laika's first film to receive a PG-13 rating. The film received critical acclaim and has grossed $75 million worldwide against a $100 million budget.

== Plot ==
Portland adolescent Prue McKeel defies her parents' instructions and takes her baby brother Mac outside to play. While at a park with Prue's classmate Curtis Mehlberg, Mac is abducted by a murder of crows, which Prue and Curtis pursue into the Impassable Wilderness on the edge of town. Inside the forest, the two are pursued by uniformed anthropomorphic coyotes, led by Maksim. Curtis distracts them to allow Prue to escape. He is then brought before their leader, the dowager governess Alexandra, who explains that she is at war with bandits over control of the Impassable Wilderness—known to its inhabitants as "Wildwood"—and captures and imprisons some of them, including their leader Brendan, in the aftermath of a skirmish. A rat named Septima cautions Curtis not to trust Alexandra.

Prue is picked up by Wildwood's postmaster general, Richard, who takes her to the governor's mansion in South Wood. Along the way, they encounter the General, a colossal golden eagle. At the mansion, the governor, Lars, reveals that the woods are closed off to outsiders and imprisons Prue to hide her arrival. After receiving a message from Owl Rex, prince of the Avian Principality, Prue manages to escape and meet with him. Owl Rex relays Alexandra's tragic past: her beloved son, Alexei, had died during a horseback outing with his parents, but his body was never found, causing her husband, the former governor, to die of grief. Using black magic, Alexandra placed Alexei's soul into a new mechanical body, only for him to commit suicide upon discovering the truth behind his existence, leading to Alexandra's arrest for witchcraft and eventual exile.

Curtis finds Mac in the coyote warren, but is subsequently imprisoned with the bandits. Owl Rex is arrested by Lars' forces, but has the General fly Prue to the enigmatic mystic Iphigenia in North Wood. They are shot down en route by the coyotes, resulting in the General's death and Prue's capture. When Alexandra's attempts to divert Prue's suspicions fail, she convinces Prue that Mac has died. A devastated Prue returns home, where her parents reveal that, after struggling with infertility, they enlisted Alexandra to help them conceive their first child through magic. In exchange, they promised Alexandra their second-born child. They attempted to avoid this by only having one child, but failed when they unexpectedly had Mac. This magic granted Prue the ability to cross into Wildwood. Realizing that Mac is still alive, Prue sneaks back into the woods to find Iphigenia.

Alexandra prepares to march on the bandits' ancestral land, where she intends to sacrifice Mac on an altar in order to wake and take control of Wildwood's ivy to locate Alexei's body so she can revive him; however, the woods' inhabitants know she will lose control of its power, destroying their world. Septima frees Curtis, who helps Brendan and the other bandits escape with him. After meeting Prue, Iphigenia and the people of North Wood prepare for war. Knowing that they all share the mutual goal of stopping Alexandra, Prue negotiates an alliance between the two armies.

On the battlefield, Alexandra's army is pincered and crushed by the combined forces, though Brendan is wounded and Septima dies protecting Curtis. Maksim attacks Prue but is killed by Curtis, allowing Prue to reach the altar. Iphigenia and Prue attempt to reason with Alexandra, but she refuses to listen. Prue's hand is cut in the struggle. Absorbing her magic-infused blood, the ivy is made to obey her commands, causing a botanical tornado that saves Mac. Enraged, Alexandra attempts to sacrifice Prue instead. As Prue begs Alexandra to stop, the ivy fatally impales Alexandra and consumes her body, before Prue finally manages to take control and calm the ivy.

In the aftermath, Alexandra's coyotes abandon their uniforms and flee. Prue and the bandits stage a coup against Lars, taking control of South Wood and freeing Owl Rex. Prue, Curtis, and Mac return home, where Prue makes peace with her parents and, though haunted by the losses of her journey, begins to come to terms with the complexities of adulthood. Prue later plays with Mac, who is now allowed to go outside.

== Voice cast ==
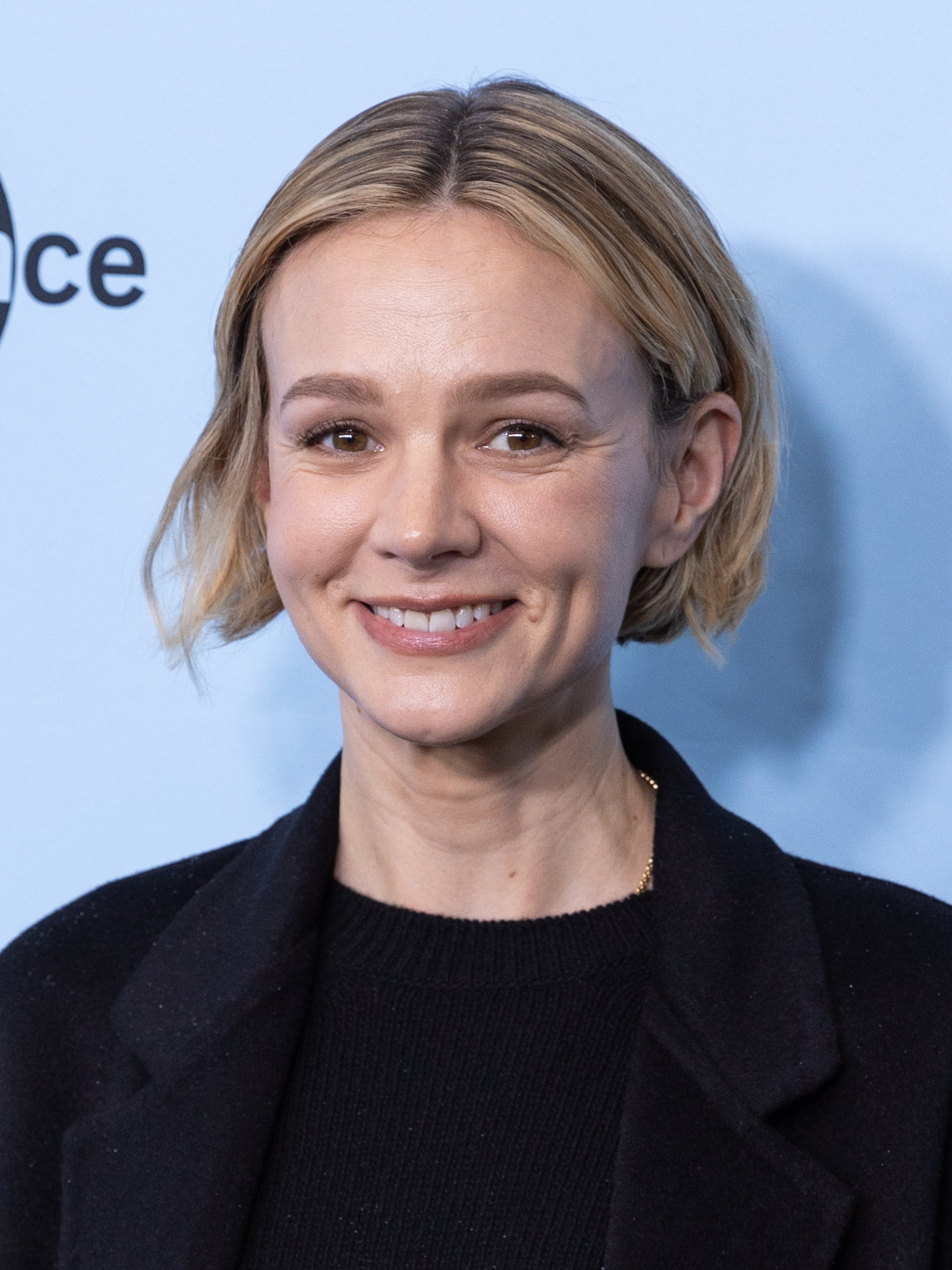
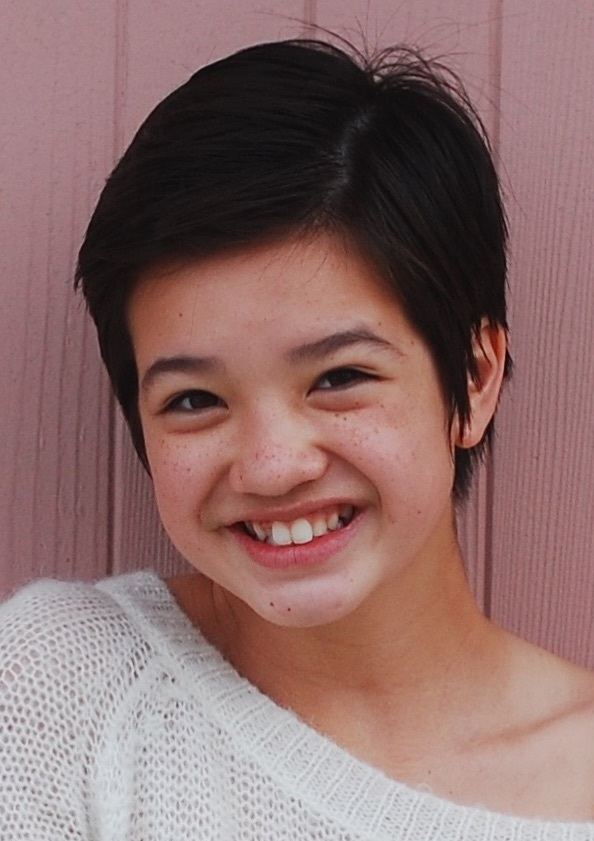
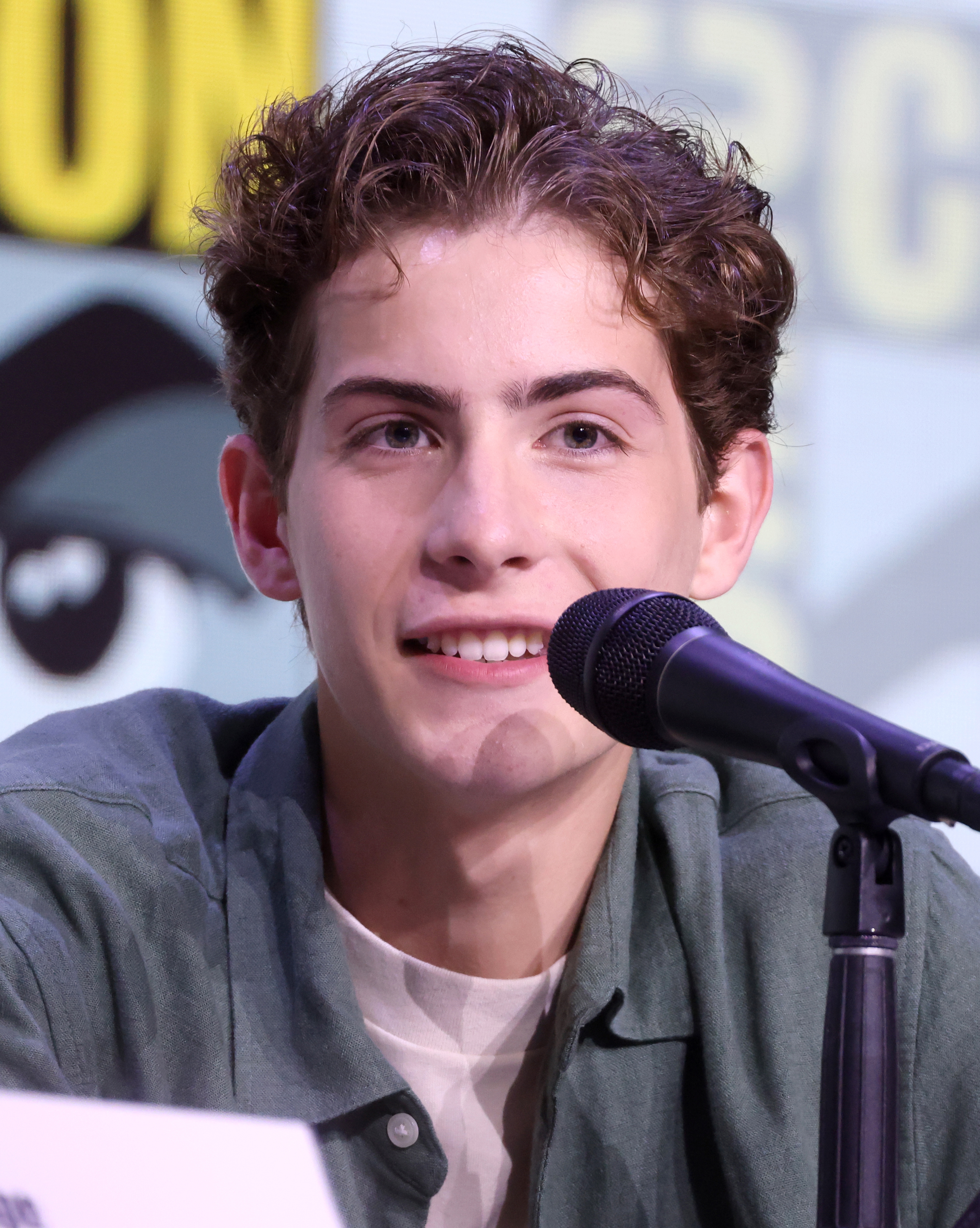
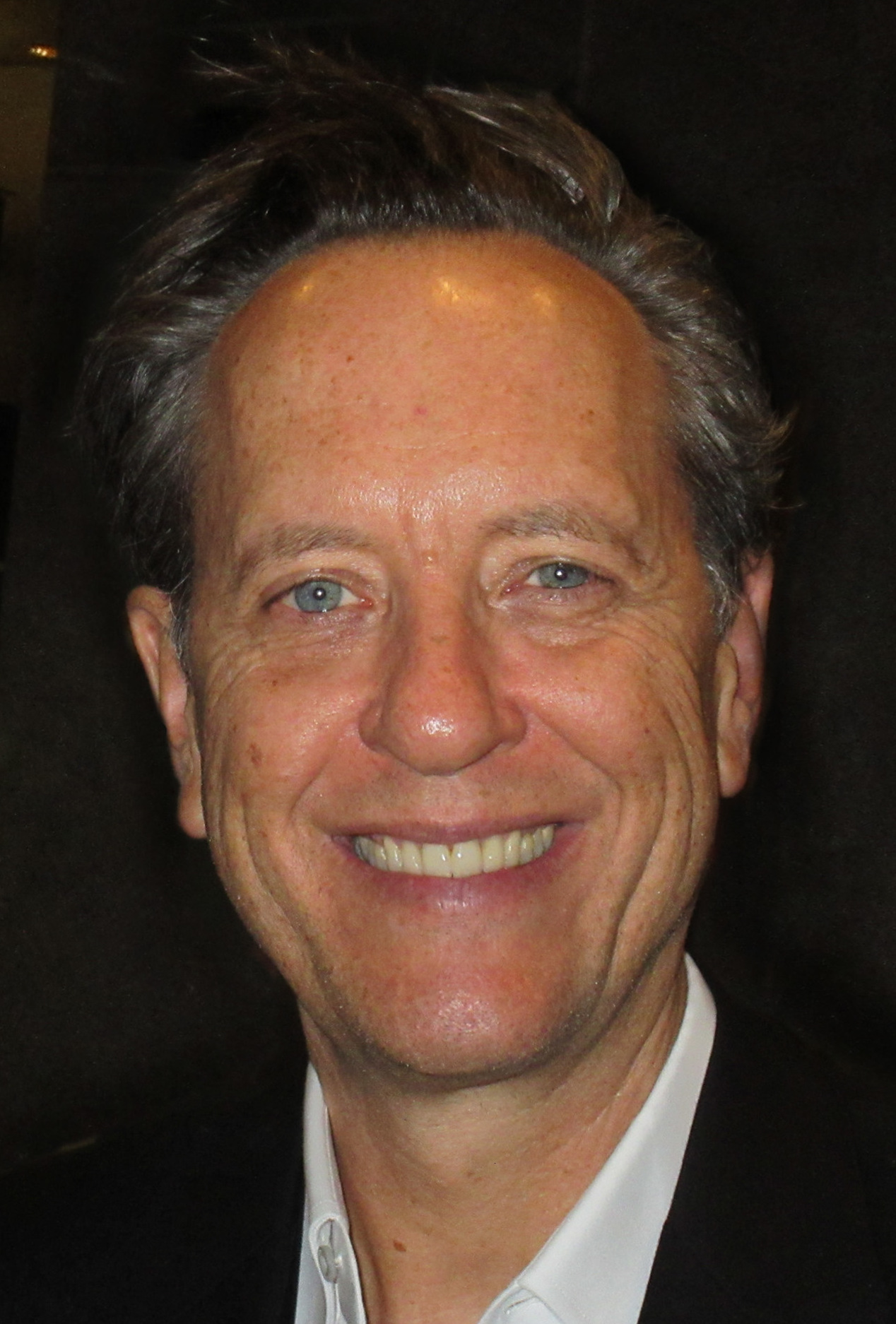
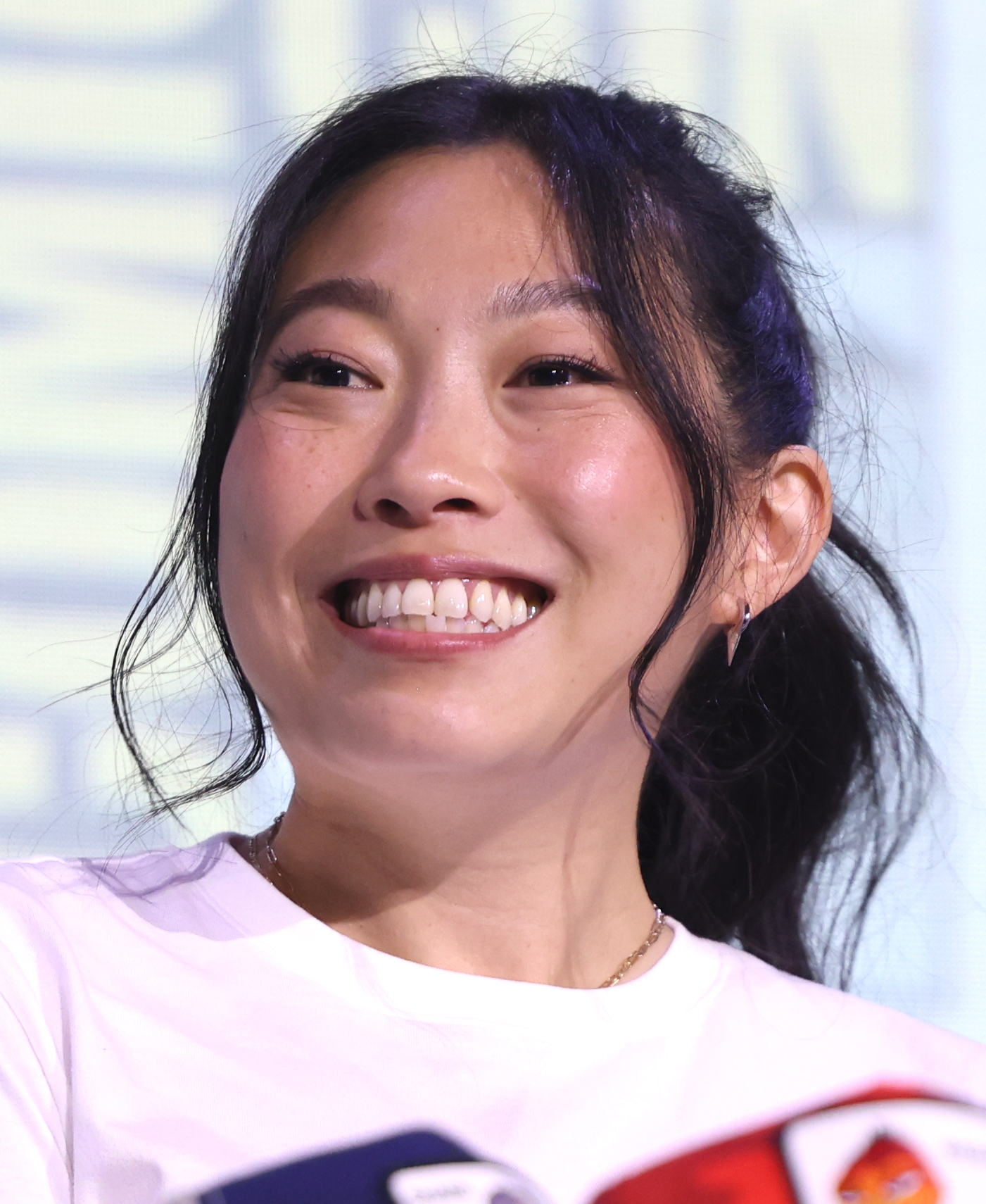
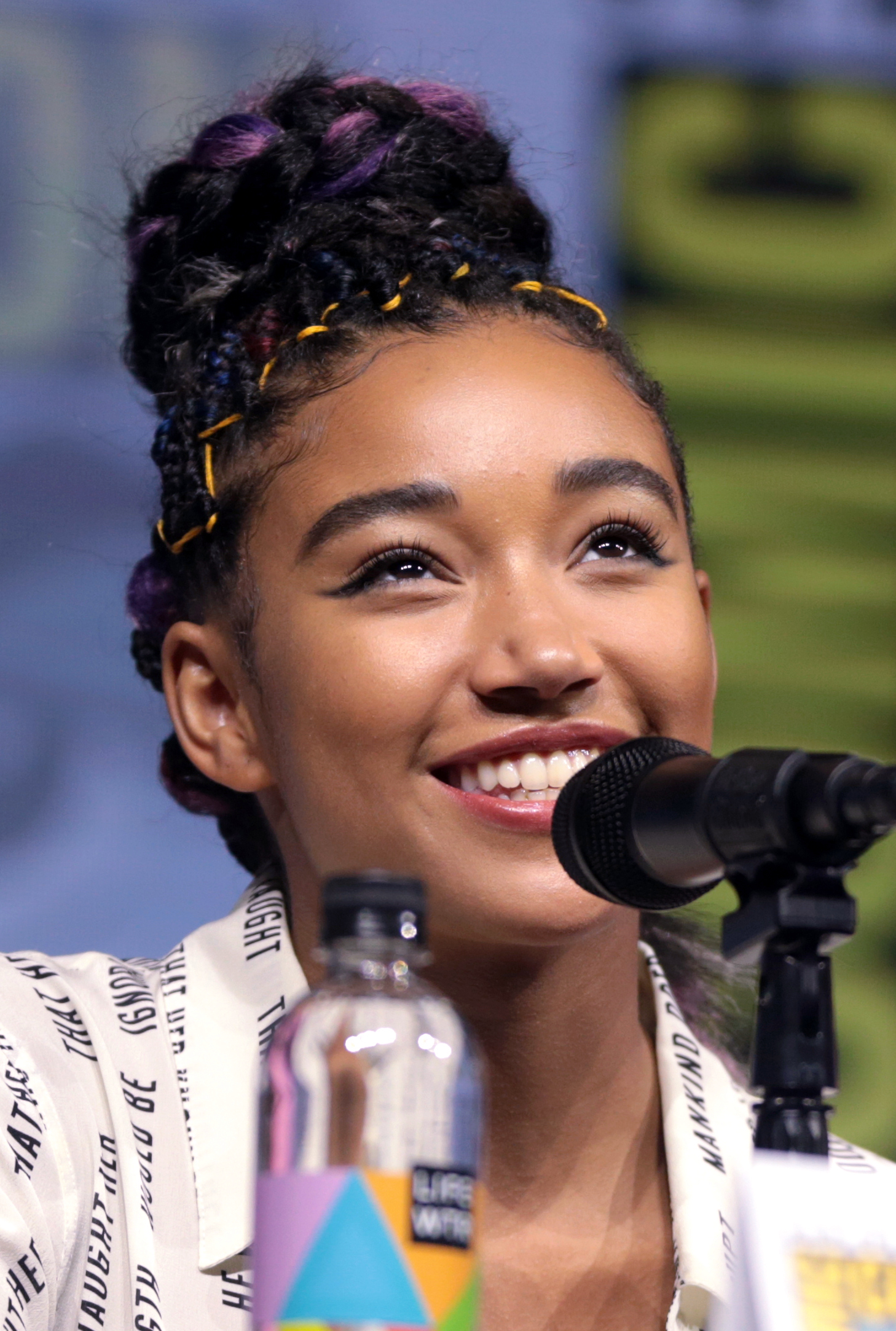
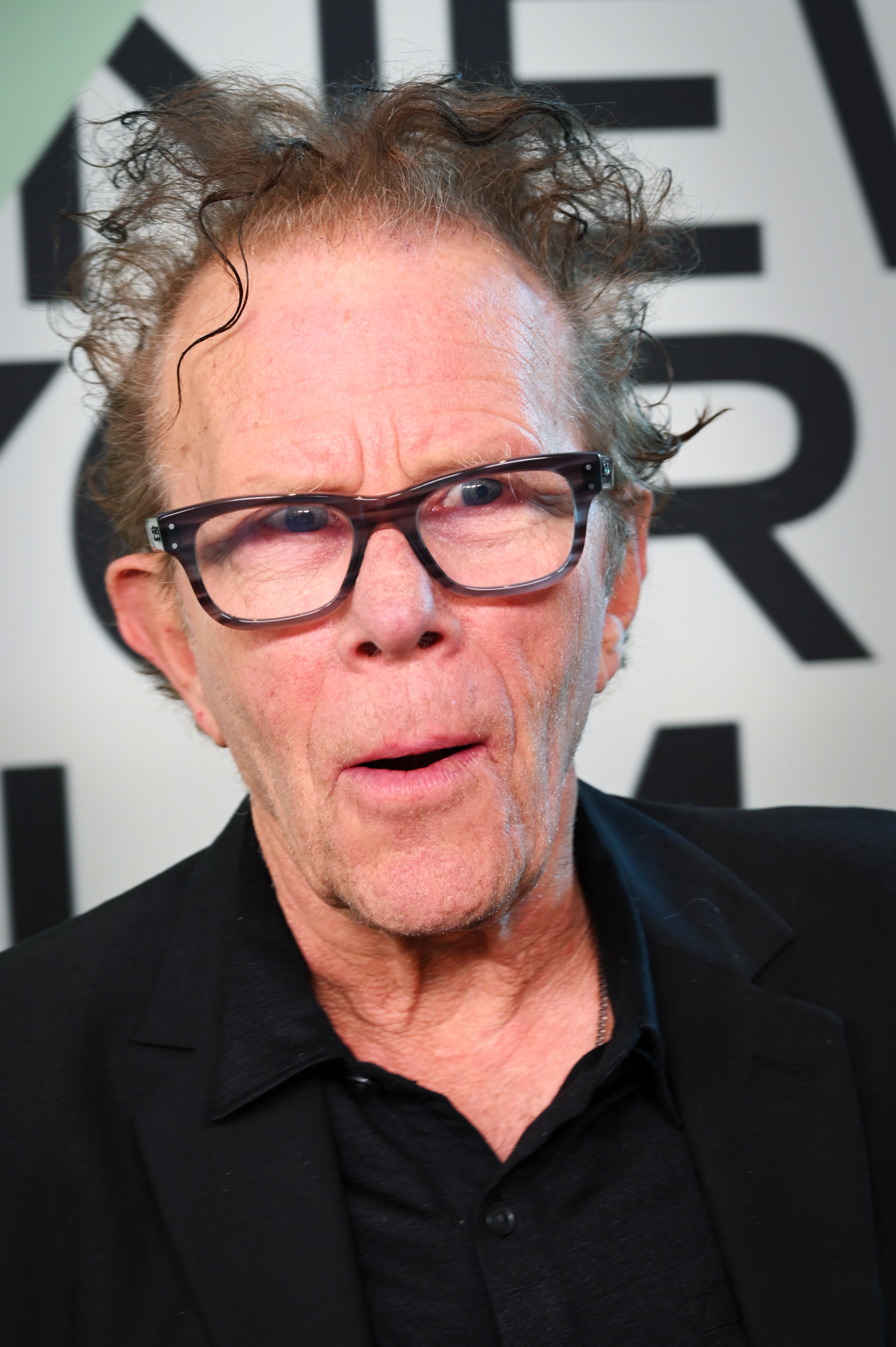
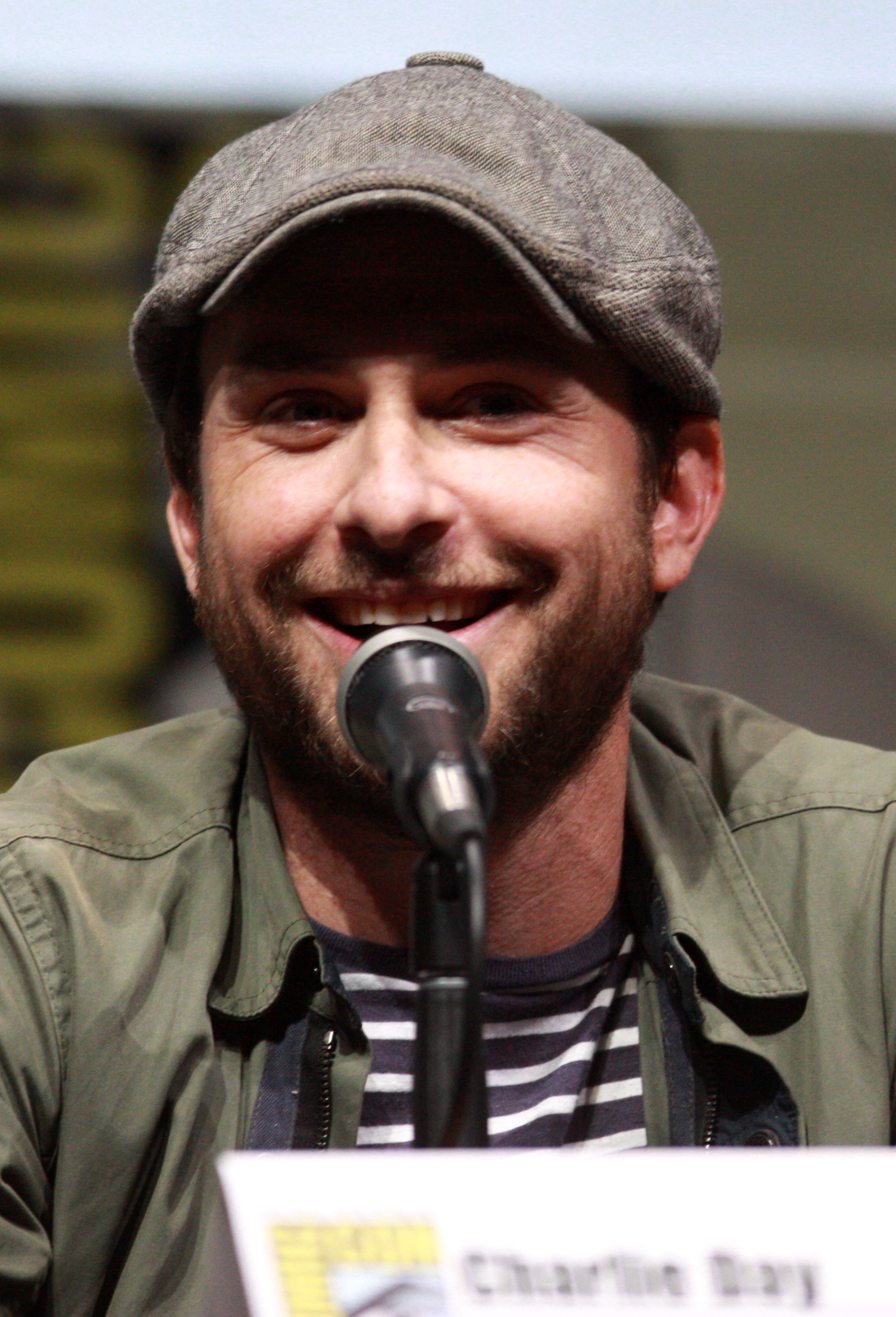
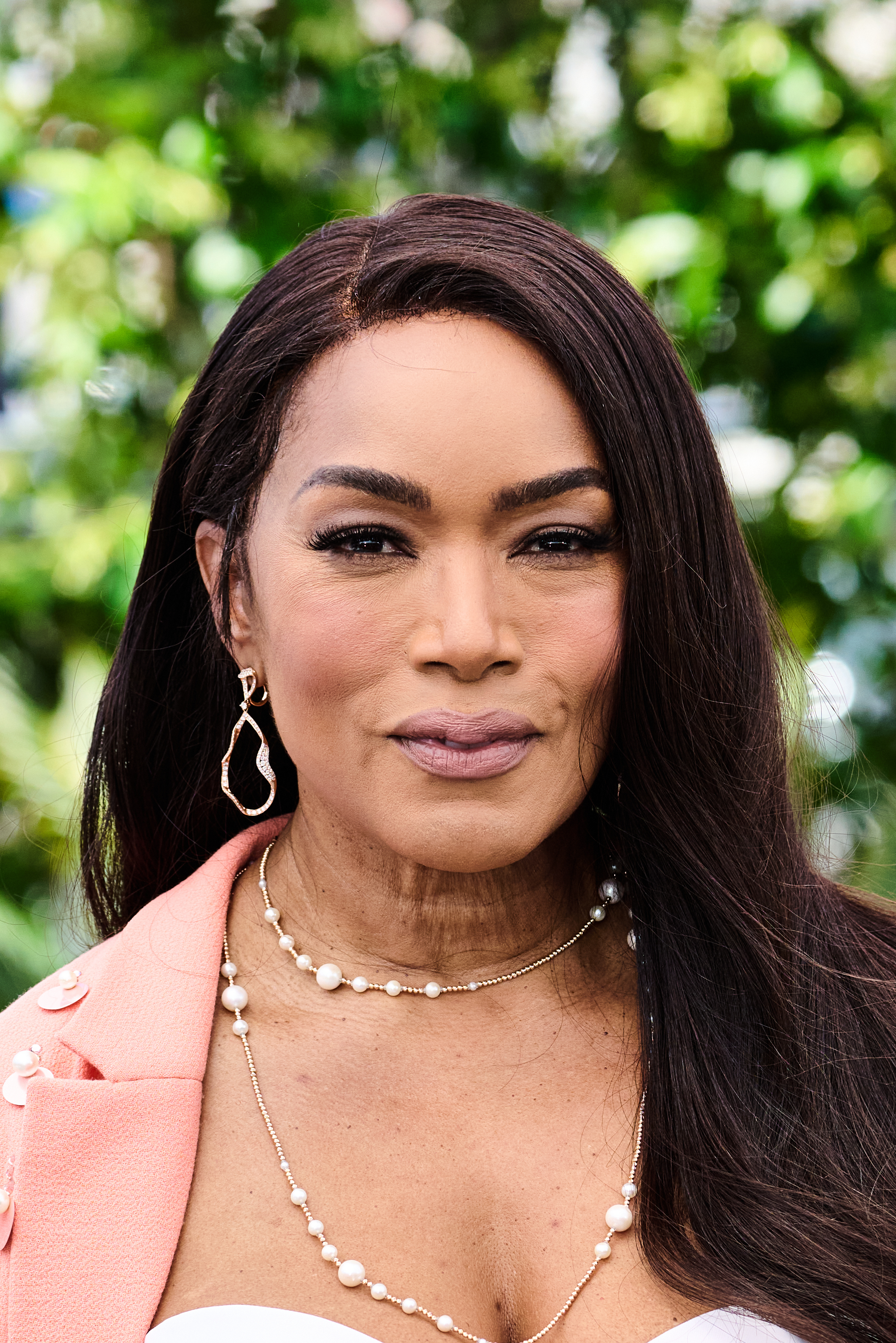
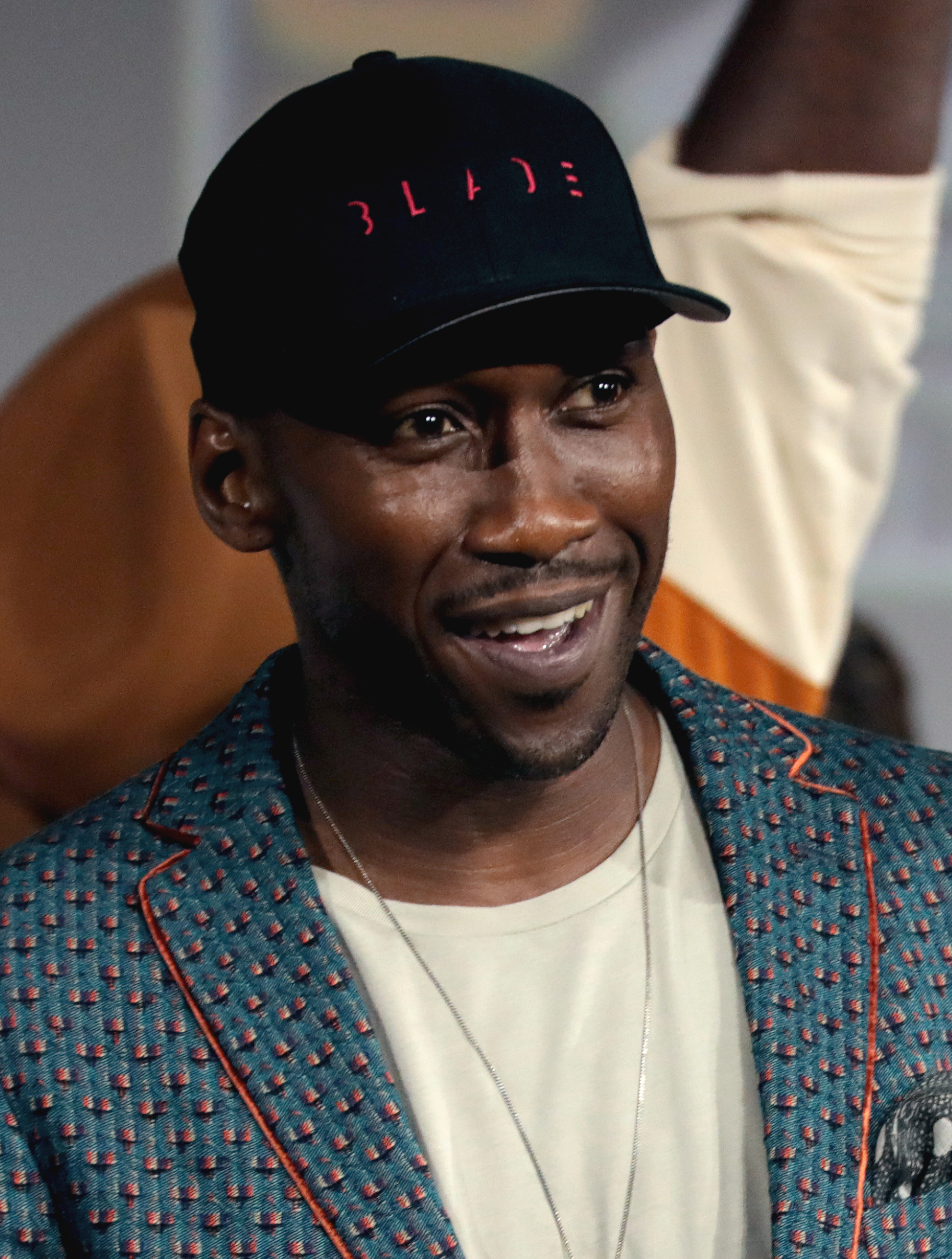
Cast of Wildwood: Carey Mulligan, Peyton Elizabeth Lee, Jacob Tremblay, Richard E. Grant, Awkwafina, Amandla Stenberg, Tom Waits, Charlie Day, Angela Bassett, and Mahershala Ali.
- Peyton Elizabeth Lee as Prue McKeel, an adolescent girl who must rescue her infant brother Mac from an enchanted place.
- Jacob Tremblay as Curtis Mehlberg, a hapless but bighearted, steadfast boy who is Prue's classmate and sidekick.
- Carey Mulligan as Alexandra, a dowager governess who once ruled The South Wood benevolently
- Mahershala Ali as Brendan, the Bandit King and leader of Wildwood's bandits
- Richard E. Grant as Owl Rex, a wise old owl who is the Crown Prince of Avian Principality
- Angela Bassett as the General, a giant golden eagle who becomes Prue's guide
- Awkwafina as Septima, a fiercely nimble rat allied with the bandits who befriends Curtis
- Amandla Stenberg as Niamh, a member of the bandits
- Tom Waits as Maksim, a coyote and Alexandra's lead soldier of her coyote army
- Charlie Day as Dmitri, a misfit coyote discharged from the army allied with the bandits
- Blythe Danner as Seer, a mysterious fortune teller aligned with Alexandra
- Arthur Knight as Mac McKeel, Prue's 1-year-old infant brother; Arthur is Travis Knight's youngest son
- Maya Erskine as Mrs. McKeel, Prue and Mac's mother
- Jake Johnson as Mr. McKeel, Prue and Mac's father
- Rob Delaney as Samuel, a rabbit constable from the North Wood
- Tantoo Cardinal as Iphigenia, a mystic from the North Wood
- Jemaine Clement as Roger Swindon, a power-hungry member of the South Wood and Lars' right-hand man
- Marc Evan Jackson as Lars Svik, a diplomat who is Alexandra's nephew
- Len Cariou as Richard, a postmaster general of Wildwood
- Ólafur Darri Ólafsson as Seamus, a member of the bandits
- Colleen O'Shaughnessey as Ember, a small but spirited sparrow

== Production ==
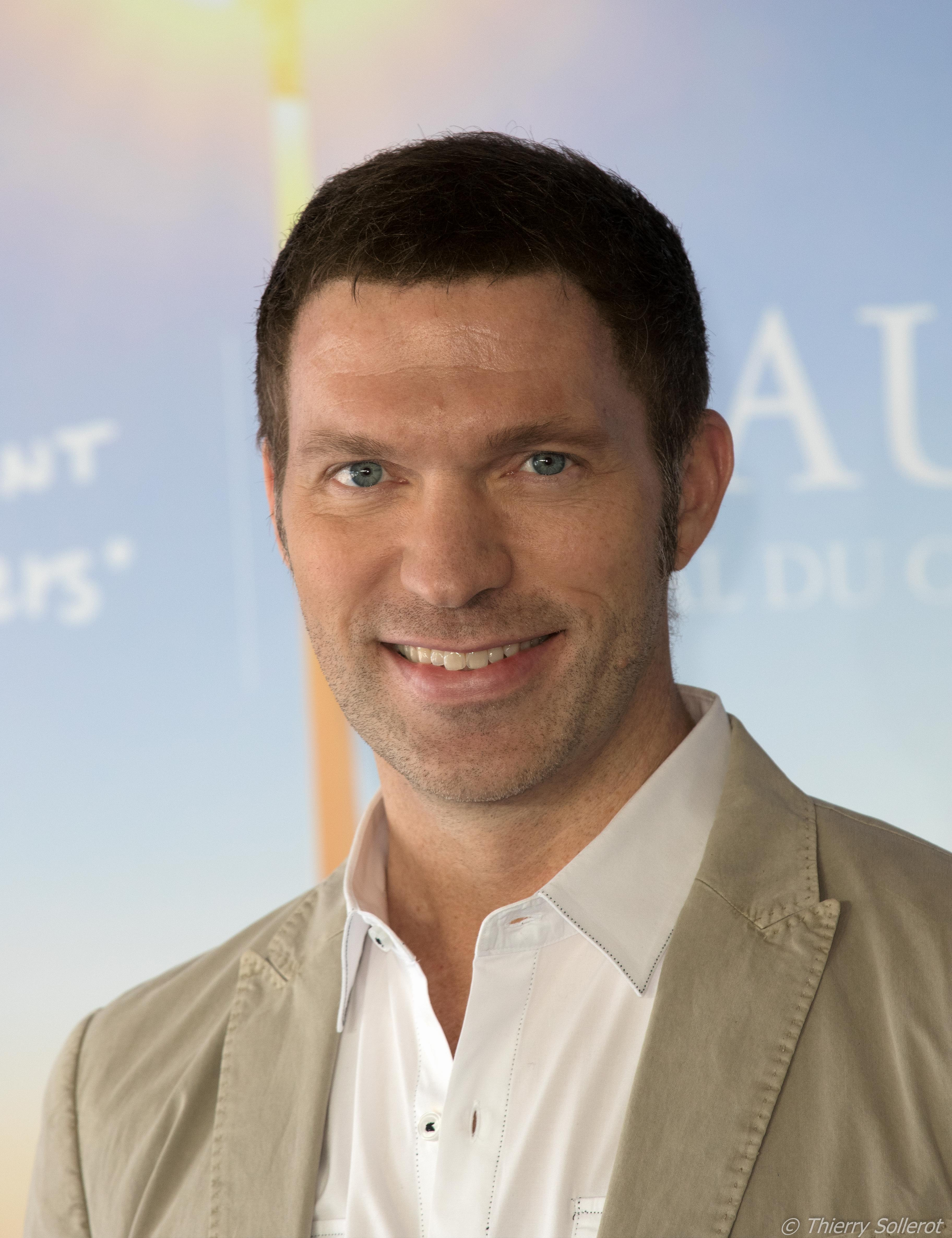
Director Travis Knight

In September 2011, a week after the release of the book Wildwood, Laika had optioned the novel for a stop-motion animated feature film, after producing the trailer for the book.

The film quietly began shooting in May 2021, before being announced. Production took place at Laika's facility studio just outside Portland, Oregon, and is the first film set in its hometown. Voice recording also privately occurred in 2021.

Then, in September 2021, Laika announced their next film would be Wildwood, with Travis Knight set to direct, Arianne Sutner to produce, and Chris Butler writing the screenplay for the film. In 2024, Knight revealed the project was the most ambitious film that Laika had ever made: "We've had to build up the creative tools, the technology and our storytelling muscles to do this book justice." Examples of unique challenges included staging epic battles, aerial sequences, and crafting the eagle character. The animation of the eagle was primarily done by Dobin Yanez over the course of four years.

The production features 136 sets and 231 practical puppets. In addition to facial components, 3D printing was employed to create armatures, puppet musculature, and simulated water, with VFX providing additional touch-ups. Due to the complexity with which the crows were going to be utilized, they were created digitally from scans of hand-sculpted models of various crow elements such as feathers, beaks, eyes, and feet. Facial animation was created digitally and then 3D printed and finally added frame by frame to the puppets with as many as 24 printed faces per puppet per one second of film.

=== Casting ===
In August 2022, Carey Mulligan, Mahershala Ali, Peyton Elizabeth Lee, Jacob Tremblay, Awkwafina, Angela Bassett, Jake Johnson, Charlie Day, Amandla Stenberg, Jemaine Clement, Maya Erskine, Tantoo Cardinal, Tom Waits, and Richard E. Grant were announced as part of the voice cast of the film. The rest of the cast was not revealed until May 2026.

== Music ==
In May 2022, Dario Marianelli was announced to compose the film's musical score. It is his third score for a Laika film, following The Boxtrolls (2014) and Kubo and the Two Strings (2016), and his third collaboration with Knight, following Kubo and Bumblebee (2018). The score soundtrack was released on October 23, 2026, with a new original song provided by The Decemberists, and as a single released on October 9.

A soundtrack inspired by the film, Wildwood Sessions, was released on October 16, 2026, consisting of 14 tracks from Still Woozy, Saya Gray, Omari Jazz, Bocha, Donte Thomas, Amine, Portugal. The Man, Ringdown, Quickly, Quickly, New Constellations, Three for Silver, Ryan Oxford, Rachel Fannan, and The Decemberists.

== Release ==
Wildwood had its world premiere at the 70th BFI London Film Festival on October 11, 2026. It was also programmed at the 24th Alice nella Città festival in Rome and the 59th Sitges Film Festival.

In January 2026, Laika announced that it would be partnering with Fathom Entertainment on the domestic release of Wildwood, and FilmNation Entertainment for handling international sales. The film was theatrically released in the United States on October 23, 2026. Beta Fiction Spain secured Spanish theatrical distribution. Black Bear Pictures will handle theatrical distribution in the United Kingdom. VVS Films will handle theatrical distribution in Canada.

The film is Laika's first to receive a PG-13 rating from the Motion Picture Association, as well as a 12A rating (for theatrical exhibition) from the British Board of Film Classification and an M rating from the Australian Classification Board.

=== Home media ===
The film will be released in the United States on DVD, Blu-ray, and Ultra HD Blu-ray on January 12, 2027 followed by a 4K steelbook on February 16 by Shout! Studios, who previously acquired the home video rights to Laika's first four animated features in 2021.

== Marketing ==
Advertisement at a bus stop in Southeast Portland's Woodstock neighborhood, 2026

A title reveal was shown before 15th anniversary showings of Coraline (2009), and a three-minute behind-the-scenes video was shown before 13th anniversary showings of ParaNorman (2012). A book detailing the making of the film was released on March 10, 2026. An art installation, Wildwood: Follow the Crows, was installed in Portland, Oregon, on August 7, 2026. Similar to the 2024 installation Coraline's Curious Cat Trail, Wildwood: Follow the Crows is a collaboration between Laika, Oregon Health and Science University's Doernbecher Children's Hospital, Wild in Art, the Portland Metro Chamber, and Downtown Portland Clean and Safe, and is supported by the Visit Downtown Campaign. An official teaser trailer was released on May 13, 2026, and a new full-length trailer for the film was released on August 19, 2026. It had 179 million views on both trailers altogether, becoming the biggest trailers launch ever for a fully stop-motion–animated film. The final trailer was released on September 16, 2026.

== Reception ==
=== Box office ===
As of November 22, 2026, Wildwood had grossed $52 million in the United States and Canada, and $23 million in other territories, for a total of $75 million worldwide.

In the United States and Canada, Wildwood was released alongside Klara and the Sun, Clayface, Wicker, and Ali G: Who Iz I?, and was projected to gross $6–8 million from 2,817 theaters in its opening weekend. It ended up debuting to $12.3 million and finishing in third behind Clayface and holdover You Can See Everything.

=== Critical response ===
On the review aggregator website Rotten Tomatoes, 97% of 191 critics' reviews are positive, with an average rating of 8.7/10. The website's consensus reads: "A marvelous technical achievement that packs an emotional wallop, Wildwood reaffirms the value of a thoughtful fantasy tale told straight while dazzling the eye with its innovative and painstaking stop-motion wizardry." Metacritic, which uses a weighted average, assigned the film a score of 87 out of 100, based on 39 critics, indicating "universal acclaim." Audiences polled by CinemaScore gave the film an average grade of "A" on an A+ to F scale.

The Hollywood Reporter and FilmHounds regarded this film as a masterpiece. FilmHounds also thought it was "a cinematic achievement that we won't soon see the likes of again." John Nugent wrote a five-star review in Empire, saying that "It is the nuanced, lovingly studied character animation that marks Wildwood as a step-up." Nugent claimed that the film "stretches the bounds of what cinematic stop-motion can be." Similarly, Robbie Collin of The Telegraph stated "I am not sure I have ever seen a stop-motion film this intricate or lavish, nor am I sure I ever will again." The New York Times described the film's human craftsmanship as "quietly remarkable" in an age of A.I., while Time Out called it "the perfect handmade antidote to AI." Brian Tallerico from RogerEbert.com gave the film three and a half stars, saying "the stop-motion animation's attention to detail is strikingly beautiful, from the character designs and settings to how accurately Knight and his team capture both the beauty and the oddity of the Pacific Northwest."

In contrast, Alison Willmore of Vulture, while praising the stop-motion and visuals, criticized its narrative and familiar fantasy elements. She also found the film's political themes underdeveloped and its final battle generic and forgettable.

=== Latin American dubbing ===
The Latin American Spanish version of Wildwood faced criticism over the casting and performances of celebrities and content creators selected for the lead roles, instead of voice actors, including Macarena García, Natalia Téllez and Javier Ibarreche. Their performances were widely described as plain, unemotional, and unprofessional. Following a box office disappointment, public criticism and a petition demanding a new dub, distributor Imagem Films announced an alternative version dubbed by professional voice actors, set to premiere in Mexican cinemas on November 12, 2026.

=== Accolades ===
Award	Date of ceremony	Category	Nominee(s)	Result	Ref.
Sitges Film Festival	October 18, 2026	People's Choice Grand Prize for Best Feature Film	Wildwood	Won	
SCAD Savannah Film Festival	November 2, 2026	Audience Award	Wildwood	Runner-up	
Hollywood Music in Media Awards	November 18, 2026	Best Original Score – Animated Film	Dario Marianelli	Won	
Hollywood Music in Media Awards	November 18, 2026	Best Original Song – Animated Film	"The Better Part of Bravery" – Colin Meloy	Nominated	

== Future ==
Following the release of the film, Colin Meloy and Carson Ellis, author and illustrator of the original book respectively, along with Knight and Lee, expressed interest in adapting the novel's two sequels, Under Wildwood and Wildwood Imperium, with Meloy believing "a lot of it depends on how much this one probably resonates with audiences."
