= Pince-nez =

Style of glasses

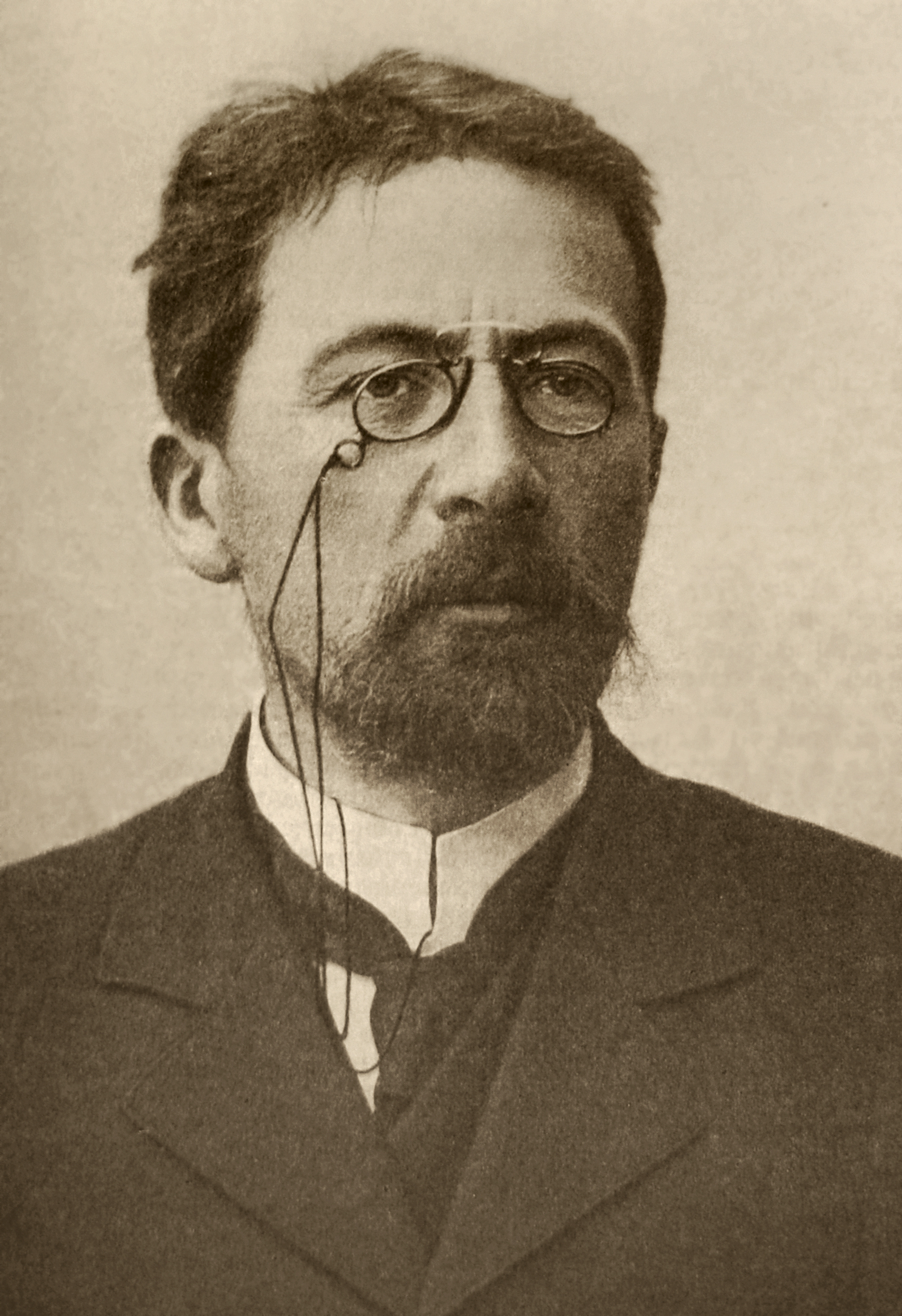
Anton Chekhov with pince-nez, 1903

Pince-nez (/ˈpɑːns.neɪ/, /ˈpɪns.neɪ/, or /ˈpæ̃s.neɪ/, plural form same as singular; French pronunciation: [pɛ̃s.ne]) is a style of glasses, popular in the late-19th and early-20th centuries. The lenses are supported without earpieces, in a frame pinching the bridge of the nose. The name "pince-nez" comes from French pincer ('to pinch') and nez ('nose'). English-speakers can use the synonym "nose-nippers".

Although pince-nez were used in Europe from the late-14th century, modern ones appeared in the 1840s and reached their peak popularity around 1880 to 1900. Because they did not always stay on the nose when placed, and because of the stigma sometimes attached to the constant wearing of eyeglasses, pince-nez were often connected to the wearer's clothing or ear via a suspension chain, cord, or ribbon so that they could be easily removed and not lost.

== Varieties ==
=== Rivet spectacles ===
Bone handle pince-nez

The earliest form of eyewear for which any archaeological record exists comes from the middle of the 15th century. It is a primitive pince-nez whose frames were made from two pieces of either metacarpal bone from the forelimb of a bull or large pieces of antler. The pieces were paddle-shaped, and joined by an iron rivet that provided the tension over the nose and allowed the lenses to be folded together. The purpose of the three holes at the place where the handle connects to the hinge is uncertain, though they may have been used for pinhole vision, a principle that was known from ancient times. Each paddle was split at one end to allow for the insertion of a lens, with the split closed by a piece of copper wire in normal use. The frames were extremely light, but the tension in the rivet would have loosened over time, making them unable to stay on the nose. Paintings depicting such frames date from as early as 1392 CE.

Later frames were made from cattle horn or from wood, but always with a connecting rivet for tension.

=== C-bridge ===
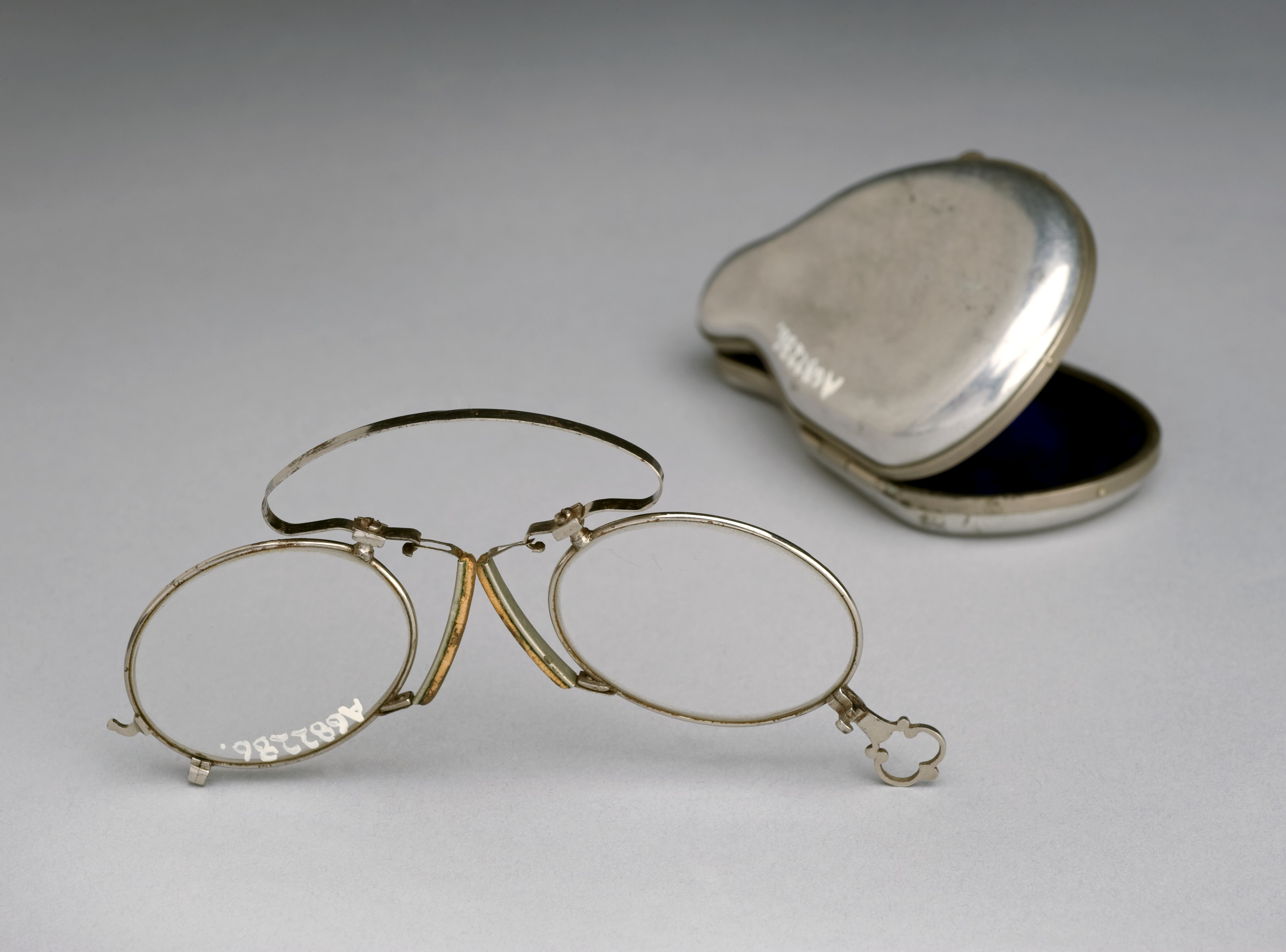
C-bridge pince-nez spectacles, cased, England, between 1875 and 1925

These pince-nez have a C-shaped curved and flexible metal bridge that provides tension to clip the lenses on the wearer's nose. They were in wide use from the 1820s to the 1940s and were available in a variety of styles, ranging from the early nose-padless type of the 19th century to the gutta-percha variety of the American Civil War era and then on to the plaquette variety of the 20th century. An advantage of this variety was that one size would fit any nose. The bridges were subject to metal fatigue from flexing when repeatedly put on and taken off, so would frequently break or lose their tension. The separation between the lenses was not fixed and might not match the user's interpupillary distance when flexed to fit, and the lenses would rotate slightly when being placed on the nose, so that the pince-nez could not be used to correct astigmatism. The disadvantages made this type fundamentally flawed for many wearers.

=== Astig ===
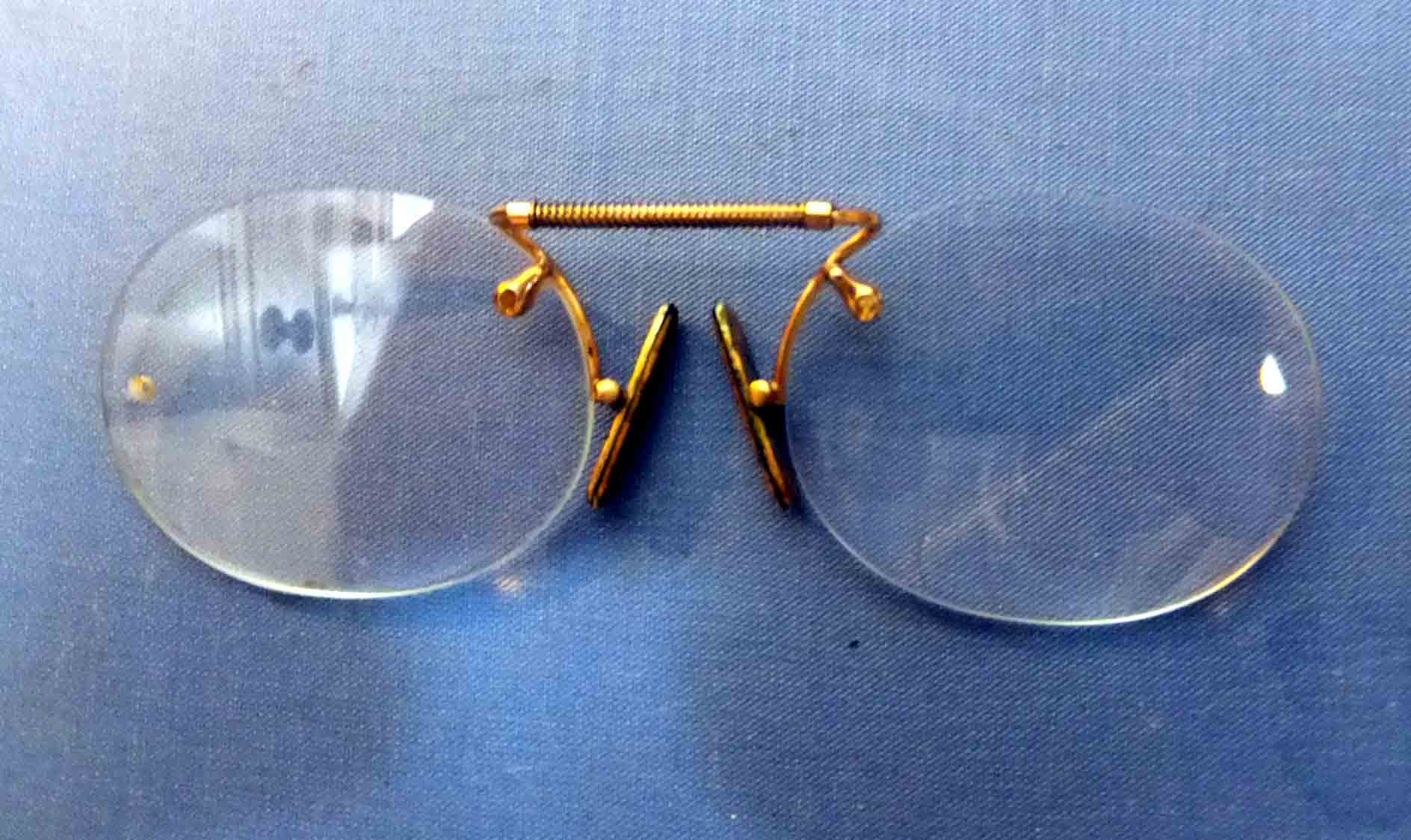
Rimless astig pince-nez

The "astig"—named for its ability to manage astigmatism—or "bar-spring" pince-nez has a sliding bar and spring connecting the lenses, which can be separated by gently pulling the lenses away from each other, then placed on the bridge of the nose and released; the spring then holds the device in place. The nose pads were traditionally made of cork, were attached directly to the frames, and were either hinged or stationary. This variety was popular from the 1890s to the 1930s. They were created and marketed as 'sporting pince-nez', which were claimed to be more difficult to jar from the face than the other varieties, and more comfortable in prolonged wear. Unlike the C-bridge pince-nez, whose lenses rotated slightly as they were placed on the nose, the astig's lenses did not rotate and consequently could correct for astigmatism, but their separation could vary and not match the user's interpupillary distance.

=== Fits-U ===
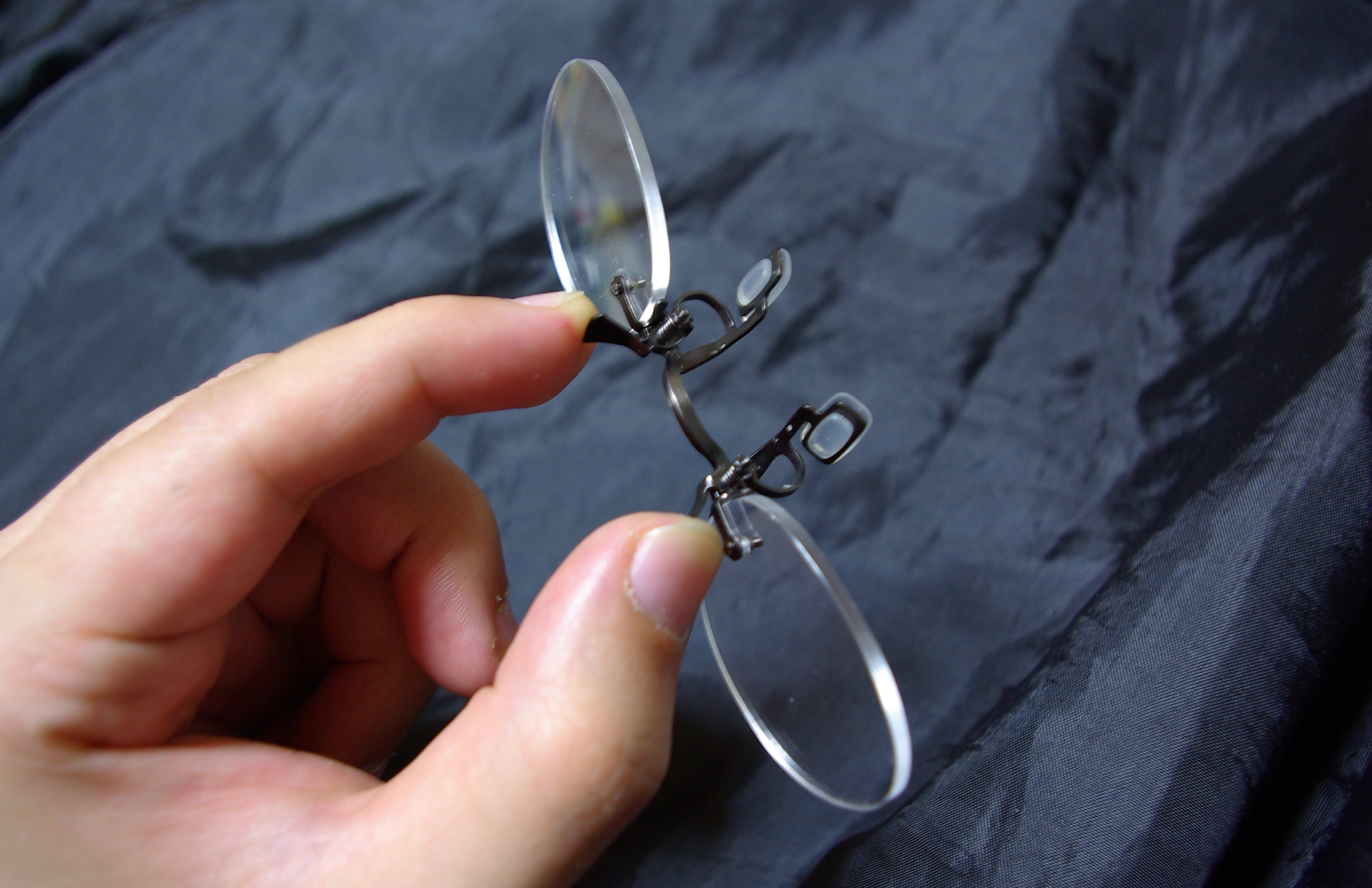
Finger-piece hard bridge pince-nez

In 1893 Jules Cottet, a Frenchman, developed and patented a finger-piece eyeglass whose lenses were connected by a rigid bridge, with springs in the nose-rests to clip onto the bridge of the nose. The wearer could squeeze a pair of levers located above or in front of the bridge to open the planquettes, and release them to allow them to close onto the nose. As the lenses did not rotate these devices could correct for astigmatism, and as the distance between the lenses was fixed they could be made to fit the user's inter-pupillary spacing. Cottet registered his patent in France, England, and the United States, but did not pursue production and eventually sold the patent to a London-based eyewear manufacturer, who sold it to an American firm. The design remained unused for years, until it was acquired by American Optical, which successfully marketed it under the brand name "Fits-U", quickly replacing most other pince-nez.

=== Oxford spectacles ===
Pince-nez hard bridge (top) and Oxford spectacles (bottom) compared

The difference between Oxford spectacles (or "Oxfords" for short) and the pince-nez is not frequently drawn. The style was supposedly developed in the 19th century when a professor at Oxford University accidentally broke off the handle from a pair of lorgnette spectacles and reputedly affixed two small nose-pads to the frame and found that he could use the tension in the folding spring to perch them on his nose, though the authenticity of the story has never been verified. Oxfords are descended from the lorgnette, as early examples of them often had handles in addition to nose-pads. In style Oxfords are much like the C-bridge as the tension is provided by a flexible, sprung piece of metal; they also resemble the astig, however, as the spring connecting the two lenses is distinct from the nose-pieces. Oxfords were popular in Europe and the Americas up until the 1930s.

== In popular culture ==
Pince-nez are central to the murder mystery in the Sherlock Holmes story The Adventure of the Golden Pince-Nez. Another murder mystery, Whose Body? by Dorothy L. Sayers, features a victim found dead in a bathtub wearing nothing but a pair of pince-nez.

Numerous fictional characters have been depicted as wearing pince-nez. These include Hercule Poirot in the television series Agatha Christie's Poirot, who wears pince-nez that are attached to a cord around his neck; Morpheus in the Matrix film trilogy, who wears reflective-lensed pince-nez sunglasses when he appears in the Matrix; Don Knotts' title-character in The Incredible Mr. Limpet, who wears them both as a man and a fish; The Walt Disney cartoon character Scrooge McDuck; Professor Frost in the C. S. Lewis novel That Hideous Strength, who is identified multiple times by his wearing a pair of pince-nez; Koroviev/Fagott, a member of Satan's entourage in Mikhail Bulgakov's The Master and Margarita; Mr. Borgin in Harry Potter and the Chamber of Secrets; Roger Swindon in Under Wildwood, the second novel in Colin Meloy's "Wildwood" trilogy; the dastardly villain Dr. Eggman/Robotnik from Sonic the Hedgehog; and Mordecai Heller in Tracy J. Butler's Lackadaisy and the Lackadaisy short film.

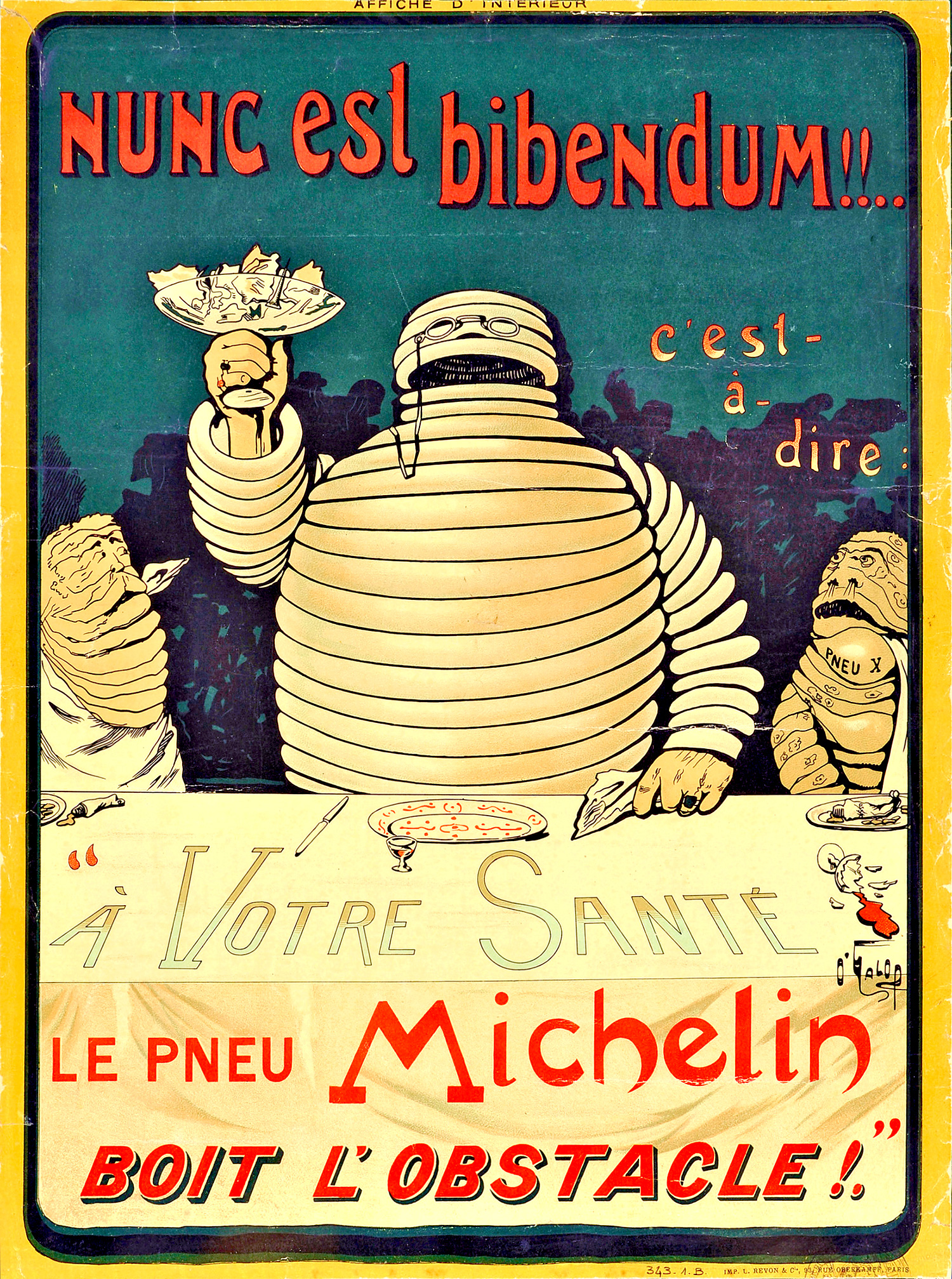
Bibendum, the mascot of the tire company Michelin, wearing pince-nez in an 1898 advertisement

In the piece Son binocle from his piano suite Les trois valses distinguées du précieux dégoûté (1914), Erik Satie depicts a jaded dandy cleaning his luxurious pince-nez, which is made from solid gold and smoked glass. Satie himself was a lifelong wearer of pince-nez.

Throughout Arthur Koestler's Darkness at Noon reference is made to the fact that the main character, Rubashov, wears pince-nez and uses them to tap on the pipes in his cell to communicate with fellow prisoners. In Darkness at Noon the pince-nez signifies Rubashov's belonging to the intelligentsia where a fellow prisoners monocle represents their belonging to the aristocracy.

Gomez Addams (The Addams Family) frequently pulled a pair of pince-nez glasses from his inside left jacket pocket including a reference to the spectacles by Doctor Motley in Season 2, Episode 18, "Fester Goes on a Diet."

The prominent Spanish poet Francisco de Quevedo always wore pince-nez, and was depicted wearing them in well-known paintings such as a portrait by Juan van der Hamen. Pince-nez are so characteristic of Quevedo that they came to be named quevedos in Spanish.

== See also ==
- Monocle
