= Colin Meloy Sings Live! =

Live album by Colin Meloy
- Released: April 8, 2008
- Recorded: 2006
- Genre: Indie rock
- Label: Kill Rock Stars

Colin Meloy chronology
Colin Meloy Sings Shirley Collins (2006)	Colin Meloy Sings Live! (2008)	Colin Meloy Sings Sam Cooke (2008)

Professional ratings
Aggregate scores
Source	Rating
Metacritic	70/100
Review scores
Source	Rating
AllMusic	3/5 stars
The A.V. Club	B
The Line of Best Fit	69%
MusicOMH	3/5 stars
Pitchfork	6.5/10
PopMatters	5/10
Spin	4/5 stars
The Stranger	2.5/4 stars
Three Imaginary Girls	7.5/11
Tiny Mix Tapes	3/5 marks

Colin Meloy Sings Live! is the first live album released by Portland musician Colin Meloy, frontman for the Decemberists. The album was released in April 2008, and is a collection of live recordings from various nights on the artist's solo tour in early 2006. It includes stripped down versions of songs by the Decemberists, a song that dates back to Meloy's college band Tarkio ("Devil's Elbow"), live banter and covers of The Smiths, R.E.M., Pink Floyd, Fleetwood Mac, and Shirley Collins. It includes two previously unreleased songs, "Dracula's Daughter" and "Wonder", the latter of which makes reference to Meloy's first—and recently at the time—born son.

The arrangements are simply Meloy's voice and guitar throughout. Some reviewers have noted problems with Meloy's guitar during the recording and one refers to the resulting sound quality as "disappointing." Meloy says the experience of playing Decemberists' songs without the full band was "liberating," at least initially: "...I can kind of start and stop songs, I can screw up without throwing everybody off, I can talk as much as I like without worrying about people getting antsy to move on to the next song. I guess those are the more obvious differences. But then it always gets a little lonely after I’ve done a handful of shows. I’m sure by the end of this tour I’ll be ready to get everybody on stage again with me."

Meloy supported the release with another solo tour during April and May 2008. The opening act was Laura Gibson.

== Track listing ==
1. "Devil's Elbow" - 4:17
2. "We Both Go Down Together" - 3:10
3. "Evoking a Campfire Singalong" - 0:48
4. "The Gymnast, High Above the Ground" - 6:43
5. "Here I Dreamt I Was an Architect/Dreams" - 4:55
6. "Dracula's Daughter" - 2:41
7. "Wonder" - 3:01
8. "A Brief Introduction to Shirley Collins" - 1:46
9. "Barbara Allen" (traditional) - 3:28
10. "The Engine Driver" - 3:54
11. "On the Bus Mall" - 5:59
12. "A Skull, a Ship, and a Sheep" - 1:54
13. "California One/Youth and Beauty Brigade/Ask" - 12:22
14. "The Bachelor and the Bride" - 4:10
15. "A Cautionary Song" - 3:43
16. "Red Right Ankle" - 4:17
17. "Bandit Queen" - 6:45

"Blues Run The Game" - 3:11 (bonus on vinyl version)

"Shiny" - 5:52 (bonus MP3 with download of album from insound.com and play.com)

"Grace Cathedral Hill" - 4:47 (bonus MP3 with download of album from insound.com and play.com)
