= Peyton Elizabeth Lee =

American actress (born 2004)

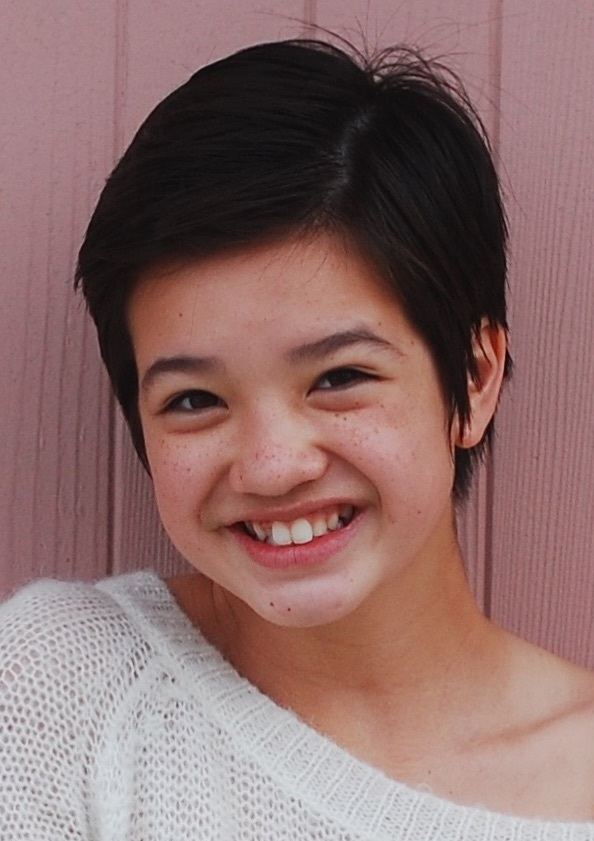
- Lee in 2017
- Born: May 22, 2004 (age 22); New York City, U.S.
- Education: Columbia University
- Occupation: Actress
- Years active: 2015–present

Peyton Elizabeth Lee (born May 22, 2004) is an American actress. She is known for starring in the title role of the Disney Channel comedy-drama series Andi Mack (2017–2019). She has continued to work with Disney in the films Secret Society of Second-Born Royals (2020), Prom Pact (2023), Pizza Movie (2026), and the series Doogie Kameāloha, M.D. (2021–2023). Lee has also voice acted Prue McKeel in Laika's Wildwood (2026).

== Early life and education ==
Peyton Elizabeth Lee was born on May 22, 2004, in New York City, she moved to Manhattan Beach, California, and began acting at the age of ten. Lee is half Chinese on her father's side. She described her father as "one of the major reasons why I have become an actor." Her mother is of English, Irish and Italian descent. She has an older sister and a younger brother. In 2023, Lee was a freshman at Columbia University.

== Career ==
Prior to Andi Mack, Lee appeared in episodes of Shameless and Scandal. Lee debuted as the titular character in Andi Mack in 2017, when she was twelve years old. When asked about casting Lee in the lead role, Andi Mack executive producer Terri Minsky said she "liked that Lee did not look as if she had fallen off a child-star assembly line", later stating that "What's really great about Peyton is that she can easily handle both the drama and the comedy of this character." On January 9, 2018, it was announced that Lee would be joining the Disney Junior animated series The Lion Guard as Rani, appearing in nine episodes from the third season.

On January 14, 2021, it was announced that Lee would play the title role in Doogie Kameāloha, M.D., a reboot of Doogie Howser, M.D. on Disney+. Lee starred in the lead role of Mandy Yang in the television film Prom Pact alongside Milo Manheim which was released on March 30, 2023. In June 2024, Lee was cast in a Hulu original film titled Carved which was released on October 21, 2024. In 2026, Lee voiced Prue Mckeel in the Laika stop-motion film Wildwood, which is a film adaptation of the 2011 novel by Colin Meloy.

== Filmography ==
=== Film ===
Year	Title	Role	Notes	Ref.
2020	Secret Society of Second-Born Royals	Princess Sam	Streaming film	
2023	Prom Pact	Mandy Yang	Lead role	
2024	Carved	Kira	Hulu release	
2026	Pizza Movie	Ashley		
2026	Brian	Ella		
2026	Wildwood	Prue Mckeel (voice)		

=== Television ===
Year	Title	Role	Notes	Ref.
2015	Scandal	Violet	Episode: "I'm Just a Bill"	
2016	Shameless	Girl Soldier	3 episodes	
2017-19	Andi Mack	Andi Mack	Lead role	
2019	The Lion Guard	Rani	Recurring voice role season 3	
2019	Stumptown	Alyssa Frank	Episode: "Dex Education"	
2021-2023	Doogie Kameāloha, M.D.	Lahela "Doogie" Kameāloha	Lead role	
2022	Robot Chicken	Sharon Spitz, Gretchen Grundler (voices)	Episode: "May Cause an Excess of Ham"	

== Awards and nominations ==
Year	Award	Category	Work	Result	Ref.
2019	Kids' Choice Awards	Favorite Female TV Star	Andi Mack	Nominated	
2019	Young Entertainer Awards	Best Young Ensemble in a Television Series	Andi Mack	Won	
2021	Critics' Choice Super Awards	Best Actress in a Superhero Movie	Secret Society of Second-Born Royals	Nominated	
