= I Guess I Was Hoping For Something More =

I Guess I Was Hoping for Something More

Studio album by Tarkio
- Released: 1998
- Genre: Indie rock
- Length: 58:23
- Label: Barcelona

Tarkio chronology
| Falleness (1997) | I Guess I Was Hoping for Something More (1998) | Sea Songs For Landlocked Sailors (1999) |

I Guess I Was Hoping for Something More is the only full-length album by Montana band Tarkio, released under the Barcelona Records label. Frontman Colin Meloy would part ways with the band to move to Oregon shortly after. Every track on the album was re-released by Kill Rock Stars as a part of the 2006 Tarkio collection Omnibus.

The title of the album is part of a lyric from the track "Kickaround".

== Track listing ==
1. "Keeping Me Awake" – 5:42
2. "Caroline Avenue" - 5:31
3. "Neapolitan Bridesmaid" - 2:37
4. "Save Yourself" - 4:57
5. "Better Half" - 3:55
6. "Eva Luna" - 6:02
7. "Kickaround" - 5:18
8. "If I Had More Time" - 3:35
9. "Sister Nebraska" - 4:20
10. "Helena Won't Get Stoned" - 3:53
11. "Your Own Kind" - 5:13
12. "Candle" - 7:20
