= Colin Meloy Sings Morrissey =

EP by Colin Meloy
- Released: January 2005
- Recorded: 2004
- Genre: Indie rock
- Length: 17:49

Colin Meloy chronology
Colin Meloy Sings Morrissey (2005)	Colin Meloy Sings Shirley Collins (2006)

Professional ratings
Review scores
Source	Rating
Pitchfork Media	(6.6/10)

Colin Meloy Sings Morrissey was the first solo project released by Portland musician Colin Meloy of the Decemberists. The album was released in January 2005 and was available exclusively on Meloy's first solo tour. Copies of it were later made available to raise money to benefit the Decemberists after their trailer with all their instruments was stolen in 2005.

The album is his first in a series of EPs where he covers the songs of his influences. This particular EP contains six cover versions of songs by English singer and songwriter Morrissey.

== Track listing ==
Tracks written by Morrissey and Stephen Street except as noted.

1. "I Know Very Well How I Got My Name" – 2:16
2. "Pregnant for the Last Time" (Morrissey, Mark E. Nevin) – 2:31
3. "Jack the Ripper" (Morrissey, Boz Boorer) – 3:45
4. "I've Changed My Plea to Guilty" (Morrissey, Nevin) – 3:07
5. "Sister I'm a Poet" – 2:55
6. "Everyday Is Like Sunday" – 3:15
