= Colin Meloy Sings Shirley Collins =

Colin Meloy Sings Trad. Arr. Shirley Collins

EP by Colin Meloy
- Released: January 2006
- Recorded: 2005
- Genre: Indie rock
- Length: 16:47

Colin Meloy chronology
Colin Meloy Sings Morrissey (2005)	Colin Meloy Sings Trad. Arr. Shirley Collins (2006)	Colin Meloy Sings Live! (2008)

Professional ratings
Review scores
Source	Rating
Pitchfork Media	(7.1/10) link

Colin Meloy Sings Shirley Collins is the tour-only EP by Colin Meloy, lead singer of The Decemberists. Similar to his EP from 2005, where he covered six songs by Morrissey of The Smiths, Meloy covers six traditional arrangements from folk singer Shirley Collins.

== Track listing ==
1. "Dance to Your Daddy"
2. "Charlie"
3. "Barbara Allen"
4. "Cherry Tree Carol"
5. "Turpin Hero"
6. "I Drew My Ship"
