= Omnibus (album) =

Compilation album by Tarkio
- Released: January 24, 2006
- Recorded: March 16, 1997–1999
- Genre: Indie rock
- Label: Kill Rock Stars

Tarkio chronology
Sea Songs For Landlocked Sailors (1999)	Omnibus (2006)

Professional ratings
Review scores
Source	Rating
AllMusic	link
Pitchfork	5.7/10 link
PopMatters	link

Omnibus is a 2006 compilation of songs from the Montana band Tarkio.

== Track listing ==
Tracks 1–12 on disc one were originally released on the album I Guess I Was Hoping For Something More.

Tracks 1–6 on disc two were originally released on the EP Sea Songs For Landlocked Sailors, while tracks 11-14 were originally performed live on the radio station KGBA and released on the album "Live on KGBA 1998." The original KGBA album contained many songs from the band's earlier album and at the time soon to come EP, and these performances were omitted in the compilation to include only the material exclusive to the broadcast.

=== Disc One ===
1. "Keeping Me Awake" – 5:42
2. "Caroline Avenue" – 5:31
3. "Neapolitan Bridesmaid" – 2:37
4. "Save Yourself" – 4:57
5. "Better Half" – 3:55
6. "Eva Luna" – 5:59
7. "Kickaround" – 5:18
8. "If I Had More Time" – 3:34
9. "Sister Nebraska" – 4:20
10. "Helena Won't Get Stoned" – 3:53
11. "Your Own Kind" – 5:13
12. "Candle" – 6:04
13. "Standing Still" – 4:51

=== Disc Two ===
1. "Devil's Elbow" – 3:50
2. "Weight of the World" – 3:34
3. "My Mother Was a Chinese Trapeze Artist" – 4:06
4. "Mountains of Mourne" – 3:35
5. "Tristan and Iseult" – 3:46
6. "Never Will Marry" – 6:23
7. "This Rollercaster Ride" – 5:04
8. "Following Camden Down" – 5:07
9. "Slow Down" – 4:17
10. "Annabelle Leigh" – 3:21
11. "Carrie" – 4:46
12. "Am I Not Right?" – 3:49
13. "Mess of Me" – 4:20
14. "Goodbye Girl" – 4:01

Although writing most of the songs, Tarkio used some covers in the recording of Omnibus. "Never Will Marry" and "Mountains of Mourne" (originally "The Mountains of Mourne") are both Irish folk ballads that have been covered by Johnny Cash and Bill Craig respectively. "Goodbye Girl" is a cover of the Squeeze song from their album Cool for Cats.
