= Carson Ellis =

Canadian-born American artist (born 1975)

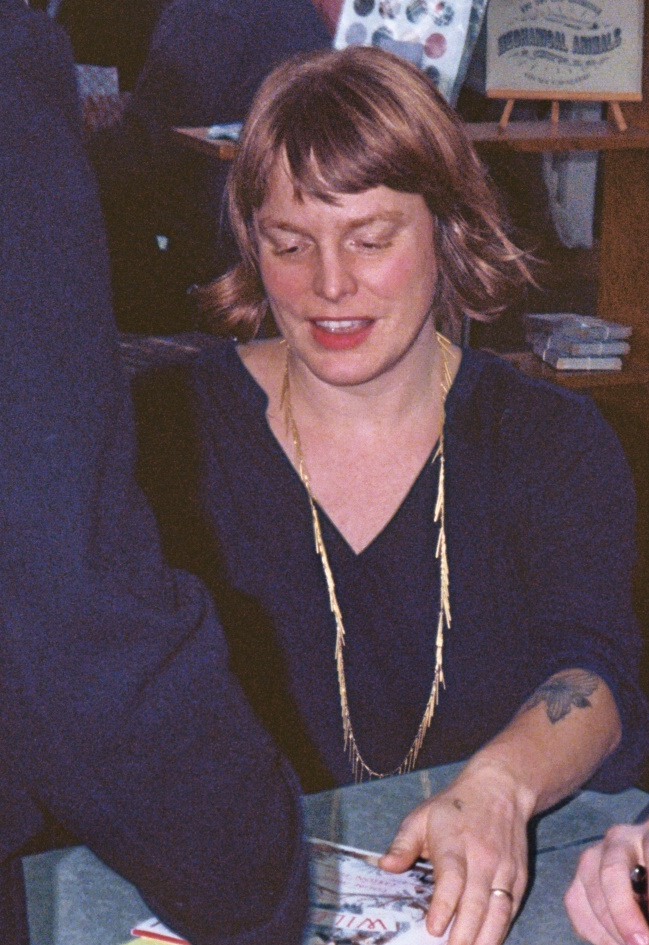
- Carson Ellis in 2011
- Born: October 5, 1975 (age 51); Vancouver, British Columbia, Canada
- Education: University of Montana
- Known for: Painting, drawing, printmaking
- Spouse: Colin Meloy
- Awards: Caldecott Honor (2017); E. B. White Read Aloud Award (2017); Society of Illustrators Silver Medal (2010 and 2014); Grammy Nomination for Best Boxed or Special Limited Edition Package (2015 and 2018)
- Website: www.carsonellis.com

Carson Friedman Ellis (born October 5, 1975) is a Canadian-born American children's book illustrator and artist. She received a Caldecott Honor for her children's book Du Iz Tak? (2016). Her work is inspired by folk art, art history, and mysticism.

== Early life and career ==
Ellis grew up in New York and studied painting at the University of Montana, where she was influenced by art history, particularly Egon Schiele, Max Beckmann, and German Expressionism. She has written poetry since she was a teenager, though she didn't study writing in school.

She began her career as a fine artist in San Francisco and exhibited a solo show of oil paintings at a gallery in San Jose, California. Her first illustration work began when she met Colin Meloy at the University of Montana and designed gig posters for his college band Tarkio.

== Career ==
Ellis is an illustrator of several children's books, including the New York Times bestseller Wildwood, written by Colin Meloy; The Composer Is Dead, written by Lemony Snicket; and The Mysterious Benedict Society, written by Trenton Lee Stewart. She received a 2010 Silver Medal from the Society of Illustrators for her art in Dillweed's Revenge, by Florence Parry Heide. She collaborated again with Meloy on the second and third novels in the Wildwood Chronicles series, Under Wildwood (2012) and Wildwood Imperium (2014).

She is also well known for her work with the indie folk rock band The Decemberists, for whom she has created album art, T-shirts, websites, posters, and stage sets. Her album and EP artwork for The Decemberists include 5 Songs (2001), Castaways and Cutouts (2002), Her Majesty the Decemberists (2003), The Tain (2004), The Crane Wife (2006), The Hazards of Love (2009), What a Terrible World, What a Beautiful World (2015), and I'll Be Your Girl (2018). Ellis was nominated twice for Grammy Award for Best Boxed or Special Limited Edition Package (2015 and 2018). She has also created album artwork for other musicians, such as Laura Veirs, Beat Circus, and Weezer.

In 2015, Ellis wrote and illustrated her first solo children's book, Home, which explores different types of domiciles around the world, underwater, and in space. The book has been criticized for the manner in which it glosses over colonization and the stereotyping of various ethnicities.

Ellis' second solo children's book, Du Iz Tak?, published in 2016, is written entirely in an invented "bug language". The book received a Caldecott Honor Award (2017) and an E. B. White Read Aloud Award (2017).

In 2016, Ellis collaborated with Portland-based wallpaper studio Juju Papers on a wallpaper design titled Barn Owls and Hollyhocks. The design was inspired by Ellis' move to a small barn outside of Portland.

Ellis created the cover and interior illustrations for Meloy's 2017 middle grade book The Whiz Mob and the Grenadine Kid, published by HarperCollins.

Ellis created illustrations for Susan Cooper's The Shortest Day, published in October 2019.

Carson Ellis is also an editorial illustrator and fine artist, having worked for The New York Times, The New Yorker, and Poetry.

=== Wildwood Chronicles ===
The Wildwood Chronicles, illustrated by Ellis and written by her husband, musician Colin Meloy, was a bestselling series for middle-grade readers. When creating illustrations for the series, Ellis was inspired by Pauline Baynes, illustrator of The Chronicles of Narnia, as well as drawings in The Wind in the Willows.

== List of works ==
=== As author and illustrator ===
- Home (Candlewick Press, 24 February 2015)
- Du Iz Tak? (Candlewick Press, 18 October 2016)
- In the Half Room (Candlewick Press, 13 October, 2020)

=== As illustrator only ===
==== Series ====
- The Mysterious Benedict Society series, written by Trenton Lee Stewart (Little, Brown)
  - The Mysterious Benedict Society (1 April 2008)
- The Wildwood Chronicles series, written by Colin Meloy (Balzer + Bray, a HarperCollins imprint)
  - Wildwood (30 August 2011)
  - Under Wildwood (25 September 2012)
  - Wildwood Imperium (4 February 2014)

==== Standalones ====
- The Composer Is Dead, written by Lemony Snicket (HarperCollins, 3 March 2009)
- The Beautiful Stories of Life, written by Cynthia Rylant (Harcourt Children's, 4 May 2009)
- Stagecoach Sal, written by Deborah Hopkinson (Hyperion, 4 September 2009)
- Dillweed's Revenge, written by Florence Parry Heide (Houghton Mifflin Harcourt, 6 September 2010)
- Illimat, board game created by Keith Baker and The Decemberists (2017)
- The Shortest Day, written by Susan Cooper (Candlewick Press, 22 October, 2019)
- What Is Love?, written by Mac Barnett (Chronicle Books, 2021)

== Personal life ==
Carson Ellis is Jewish. She is married to Decemberists singer Colin Meloy, whom she met in college while designing posters for his alt-country band Tarkio. She and Meloy have two children, Henry "Hank" Meloy and Milo Cannonball Meloy. Both parents have spoken about their son Hank's diagnosis with Asperger's syndrome.

She lives on a farm outside Portland, Oregon with her family.
