= Wildwood (novel) =

2011 novel by Colin Meloy

- Author: Colin Meloy
- Illustrator: Carson Ellis
- Cover artist: Carson Ellis
- Language: English
- Series: The Wildwood Chronicles
- Publisher: Balzer + Bray
- Publication date: August 30, 2011
- Publication place: US
- Media type: Print (hardback, acid-free paper)
- Pages: 541
- ISBN: 978-0-06-202468-8
- OCLC: 703205798
- Followed by: Under Wildwood

Wildwood is a 2011 fantasy novel by Colin Meloy, illustrated by his wife Carson Ellis, for ages nine and up. Inspired by classic fantasy novels and folk tales, the book is about two seventh-graders who are drawn into a hidden, magical forest while trying to rescue a baby kidnapped by crows. They learn of their connection to a magical parallel world while confronting adult authorities who are often cowardly or dishonest. The local color of Portland, Oregon, features prominently in the book.

Ellis collaborated closely with Meloy throughout the writing phase to produce 85 illustrations, which were particularly praised by reviewers. The majority of reviews were positive, on balance, saying the book was an engrossing story appropriate for its target age, but also noted that the plot sometimes dragged, that familiar fantasy tropes were sometimes overused, and that stereotypical Portland culture was a little overplayed. Wildwood was on the New York Times Best Seller list of Children's Chapter Books for two weeks and tied for the 2012 E. B. White Read Aloud Award.

An animated film adaptation directed by Travis Knight premiered on October 11, 2026.

== Plot ==
=== Part One ===
Prue is in a park with her baby brother Mac when a murder of crows swoops down and carries him away. Prue runs after him (followed by her classmate Curtis, unbeknownst to her), and sees the crows carry Mac into the mysterious Impassable Wilderness. Prue goes home to her parents and manages to make it look like she still has Mac by bundling up a blanket. The next morning, she heads for the Wilderness but discovers Curtis has once more followed her. Prue does not want Curtis along, but before she can send him back, they are separated while fleeing from coyote soldiers. Curtis is captured and taken to Alexandra, the Dowager Governess (the leader of the coyotes), while Prue rides a mail truck to South Wood. There, Prue finds a Kafkaesque bureaucracy and dysfunctional government. Police state tactics and paranoia over foreign threats are used to keep the regime in power. Prue eventually meets the Crown Prince Owl Rex of the Avian Principality, who tells her how Alexandra came to be exiled shortly before he himself is arrested.

Alexandra's son Alexei died in a horse-riding accident, and her husband Grigor died of heartbreak; to remedy his death, Alexandra hired the two greatest toymakers in all of Wildwood to fashion her son a new body that was later brought to life by recalling his soul via black magic. Later Alexei learned the truth of his death and rebirth and purposefully destroyed a crucial part of his inner workings, resulting in his second death. Alexandra was exiled for the use of black magic and plotted her revenge. Owl Rex proposes that Prue cross Wildwood and find help from the mystics of North Wood. Meanwhile, Alexandra is flattering Curtis with a fancy uniform and commissions him into the coyote army as an officer. In a battle against bandits, Curtis breaks a howitzer by dumb luck, becoming a coyote war hero in the operation. He then finds Mac in Alexandra's headquarters. Alexandra divulges her plan to sacrifice the baby to the magical ivy of the Wood, which will allow the ivy to rapidly consume the Wood and its inhabitants. Alexandra offers to share the power with Curtis, but he refuses and is locked away in a cage with some other captured bandits and unfaithful coyotes.

=== Part Two ===
Prue flies to North Wood on the back of an eagle sent by Owl Rex but is shot down by a coyote archer. She is found by Brendan, the King of the Bandits, who offers to help. However, they are captured in a coyote attack and Brendan is imprisoned with Curtis while Prue is taken to Alexandra. Alexandra promises her that she will find Mac, convincing Prue to leave the Woods. In prison, Curtis reveals Alexandra's plan and then leads an escape, earning the trust of the coyote and bandit prisoners. Prue returns home, where she learns from her parents that they were only able to conceive Prue and Mac because they had made a deal with Alexandra to use her magic, but that Alexandra's price was the second child that Prue's mother bore. Realizing that she has been tricked, Prue returns to Wildwood to rescue Mac.

=== Part Three ===
Back in the Impassable Wilderness, Prue travels to see the mystics in charge of North Wood. Meanwhile, Curtis and the other escapees rejoin the bandits and set out to stop Alexandra. Prue alerts the elder mystic, Iphigenia, and the citizen militia gather weapons and march south. Prue rides her bicycle ahead and convinces the bandits to join forces. Just as the sacrifice is about to occur, the armies meet in an ivy-filled ruin. Brendan gives a speech to inspire his forces, christening the combined army the Wildwood Irregulars.

The Battle for the Plinth ensues, and the Wildwood Irregulars are near defeat. As Alexandra prepares to carry out the sacrifice, Iphigenia confronts her. Curtis and the remnants of the army make a final push, expecting to be cut down when above them the sky is filled with an army of eagles and other birds from the Avians. The battle turns against the coyote army, but Prue discovers that she can control plants the way the mystics can and uses her new skill to make the tree boughs snatch Mac from Alexandra. Brendan shoots Alexandra with an arrow and the ivy consumes her. Brendan is now in command of the ivy and is told by Iphigenia to make it sleep, and he does so. The victorious Wildwood Irregulars regroup and press on to the gates of South Wood and demand that the corrupt government resign. As a new, peaceful order begins among the factions of The Wood, Prue and Curtis part ways as new friends: she goes home with Mac while Curtis remains behind to start a new life as a bandit.

== Characters ==
In Wildwood, everyone is either of The Wood, or is an Outsider, or, in the special case of the protagonists, a "half breed", that is, an Outsider who is able to enter The Wood. A sort of "aura or shine" makes it possible to visually identify which of these things a person is. The first human Prue meets in The Wood is an old man driving a mail truck, Richard, the South Wood Postmaster General. She sees in him something she "couldn't put her finger on that seemed to exude from him, something that made him seem like no one she'd ever met before. It was a kind of aura or shine, like the way a familiar landscape is transformed in the light of a full moon." The natives of The Wood are consistently able to recognize Prue and Curtis as Outsiders, who ought not to be able to enter through the Periphery Bind surrounding The Wood, while only the people of the pastoral and meditative North Wood can see with an unexplained sense that Prue and Curtis have a dual nature, born outside The Wood yet unhindered by the magical barrier that keeps the Outsiders out.

=== Prue ===
"Mother," Prue had said, now pouring rice milk over her cereal, "I told you. I'm a vegetarian. Ergo: no bacon." She had read that word, ergo, in a novel she'd been reading. That was the first time she had used it. She wasn't sure if she'd used it right, but it felt good.

— Wildwood, Chapter 1, A Murder of Crows

Prue McKeel, age 12, is a precocious seventh grader with a talent for nature drawing, an encyclopedic knowledge of birds from a book, and takes Honors English with her classmate Curtis. Like her parents, and Curtis, Prue is "very-Portland", with stereotypical interests like yoga, vegetarianism, and single-speed bicycles, which she repairs and tunes herself. Prue is decisive, determined, and courageous, finding inspiration in Nancy Drew in her effort to rescue her brother, and along the way, save Curtis and The Wood itself. Unlike Curtis, she is not cowed by anyone, standing up to Lars Svik the Governor-Regent of South Wood, Crown Prince Owl Rex of the Avian Principality, and even the fearsome Alexandra, the Dowager Governess, as well as her parents. Because Prue's birth came about by Alexandra using witchcraft to overcome Prue's parents' difficulty conceiving a child, she shares some essence of The Wood, along with being an Outsider, which is what made it possible for her to cross the magical barrier that protects The Wood. Meloy said that Prue is a composite character, "partly Carson as a kid," with her "inner world" coming from Ellis's childhood. She is also based on the niece of a friend, a girl with "an amazing independent streak that we've always admired."

=== Curtis ===
"Yeah," said Curtis. "Listen, Maksim. I can totally see how that works for you and I appreciate your commitment, but, you see, I don't know if I'm quite there yet, you know, officer material. I've only been here for a day and I'm still kind of figuring everything out."

A voice, a woman's voice, sounded from above them. "And that's why we're here, dear Curtis."

Curtis looked up and saw Alexandra, the Dowager Governess, astride a jet-black horse, emerge from over a hillock between two massive cedars. She extended a willowy hand. "Come," she said to him, "I'll show you the world."

— Wildwood, Chapter 8, To Catch an Attaché

Curtis Mehlberg is a 12-year-old, and a seventh grade classmate of Prue's, though not her close friend at the beginning of Wildwood. In the past Prue and Curtis shared an interest in drawing superhero fan art, but Prue has moved on to botanical illustration, leaving Curtis and his love of comic books behind. He is an awkward "persecuted loner" who lacks Prue's confidence, and is, at first, easily intimidated and manipulated by Prue, Alexandra, and others. He grows in the course of the book, gaining a more definite sense of who he is after being forced to choose sides and stand up to the Dowager Governess Alexandra. His relationship with Alexandra recalls the seduction of Edmund Pevensie by the White Witch in The Lion, the Witch and the Wardrobe. After being hustled into an ill-fitting role as an officer in the coyote army, he inadvertently distinguishes himself in battle. Later, by free choice, he becomes a full member of the bandits, and decides to stay behind with them in Wildwood, even as Prue returns home to St. Johns. Like Prue, Curtis is a "half-breed" who has a dual nature that allows him to enter The Wood, but the exact nature of this connection not revealed in Wildwood, other than Curtis speculating that he has a strange reclusive aunt, and a number of odd relatives.

Curtis's choice to stay in Wildwood leaves behind a grieving family in Portland. Meloy said that reading fantasy stories growing up, about "kids going to other worlds or crossing over to another place, it would invariably involve them coming back at the end," and "Whenever that character made a choice to come back, it didn't feel true to me for some reason." Meloy wanted to experiment with a character who did what Meloy wanted to do, even though he had a happy childhood and loving family. Meloy was able to connect with Curtis: "I think of Curtis as being a version of myself." As a child, Meloy "desperately longed to be taken away to another world."

=== Alexandra ===
Alexandra, the exiled Dowager Governess of South Wood, is the main antagonist of Wildwood. She is charming and beautiful, and vastly more sophisticated and civilized than her anarchic coyote soldiers she only recently domesticated. In spite of her ruthlessness and murderous intentions, she is a somewhat tragic figure as a grieving mother whose madness is somewhat explained by the loss of her child. Ellis said, of the illustration of Alexandra holding a knife over Mac, "as a mom of a little kid, just drawing that made my blood run cold." The action of Wildwood is driven by her plot to take revenge on everyone and everything in The Wood, in which she intends to use Prue's brother Mac as a blood sacrifice in a spell to control The Wood's Ivy, which will then grow out of control and consume every living thing in The Wood. The invasive threat of the magical ivy apocalypse that Alexandra plotted in the book is similar to the threat of an "ivy desert" monoculture from invasive English ivy (Hedera helix) in the real Forest Park.

=== The Bandits ===
The bandits are a small community of thieves led by the Bandit King, Brendan, a wild, tough man, whose curly orange hair is always tangled in leaves and twigs from the forest. Curtis helps him and a few other bandit prisoners escape from Alexandra's prison, and so he is named a bandit. Their small community isn't very thriving, especially with the economy being down. The bandits are threatened by the Dowager Governess' ivy, as well as the whole forest, and so he is cornered into having to fight along the citizens of North Wood and Prue.

== Setting ==
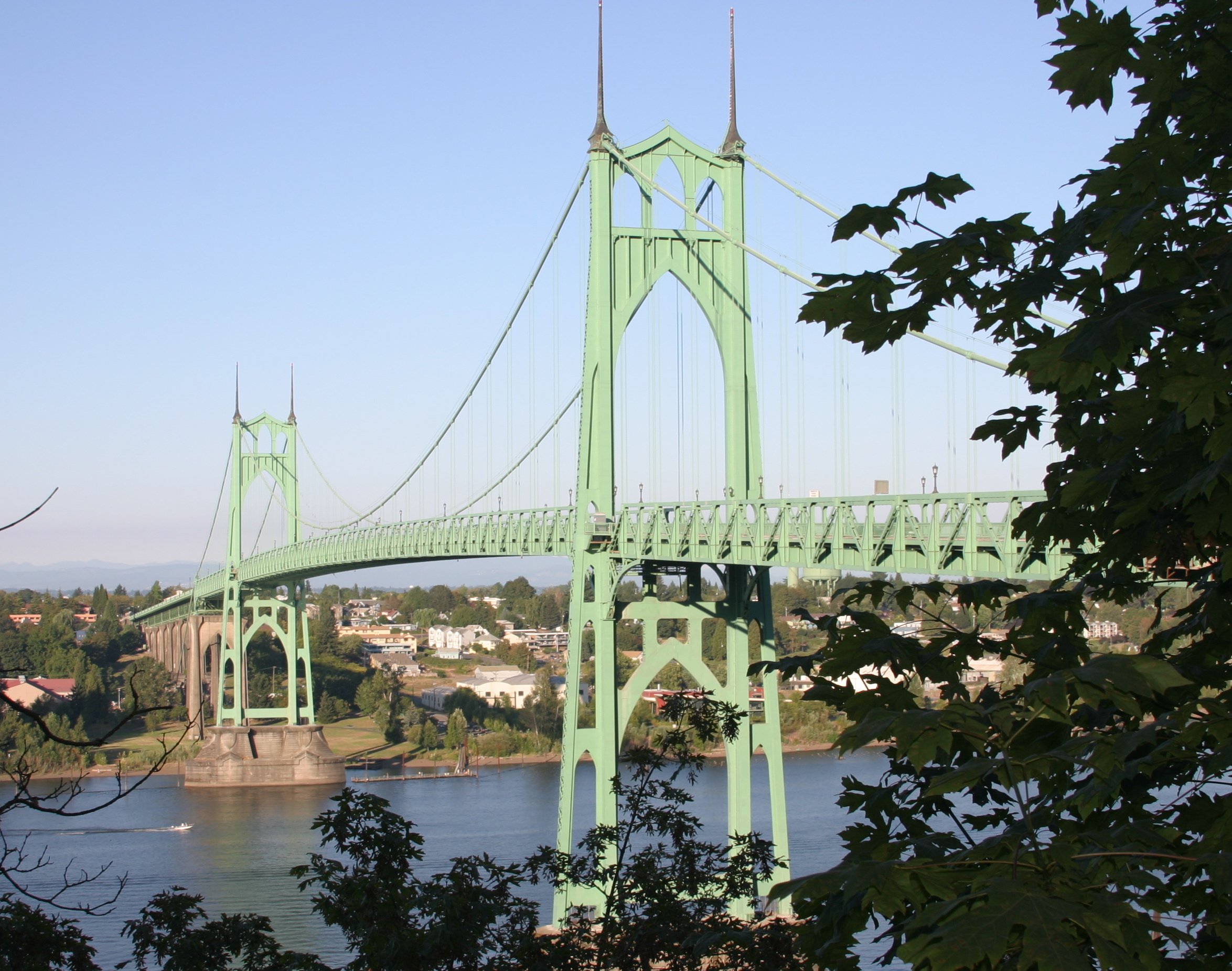
The St. Johns Bridge. In the universe of Wildwood, this is the Ghost Bridge, existing only when a rune magic spell is cast and not apparent in everyday life. Without the St. Johns Bridge, the impassable Wilderness is all the more isolated.

The premise of Wildwood is that Forest Park in Portland is "its own secret country, populated by a diverse and strange people". The real Forest Park is about 8 miles (13 km) long and 1 mile (1.6 km) wide, containing 5,100 acres (2,100 ha) of natural woods, mostly second growth forest with some old growth, all within the city limits. This place fired Meloy's imagination, and the fantasy version of Forest Park is Wildwood's "most distinctive element". Wildwood transforms Forest Park into "the darkest possible woods."

Outsiders, the people of Portland, call it the Impassable Wilderness, and they know it only as a forbidden, taboo area, never visited and rarely spoken of. Children are taught to stay away and even learn eventually to stop asking why it is forbidden. Unknown to the Outsiders, it is filled with magical people and talking beasts, some living in the pastoral, almost medieval conditions of North Wood, while the country of South Wood is industrialized with technology typical of the 19th and early 20th Century. North Wood and South Wood are separated by Wildwood, an untamed no-man's-land filled with bandits and ostensibly wild coyotes. Travelers, and the Postmaster's truck, make the risky journey from the northern and southern countries by the Long Road through Wildwood. Tucked between Wildwood and South Wood is the Avian Principality, a nation of birds.

Nearly every location in the imaginary setting is carried over from Portland's actual geography. The story begins in the protagonists' neighborhood, St. Johns, before moving across the Willamette River and into the impassable Wilderness, that is, The Wood. Pittock Mansion, located just south of Forest Park, appears under its real name, but serves as the seat of government of South Wood, while the Oregon Zoo is represented as the South Wood Prison. The Bird Alliance of Oregon is in the approximate location of the Avian Principality. Ellis said there are a number of large trees in Forest Park, but no specific tree served as the model for the North Wood Council Tree.

The St. Johns Bridge is missing and unknown to the people of Wildwood's Portland. The only access Prue and Curtis have to pursue the crows into the impassable Wilderness is a risky dash over the train tracks of the Railroad Bridge, which is based on the Burlington Northern Railroad Bridge 5.1. The St. Johns Bridge does appear briefly, as the Ghost Bridge, conjured by a rune magic spell. In a question-and-answer session with Meloy and Ellis, a young reader suggested the Ghost Bridge could be interpreted as an apparition of a bridge that once existed in the past, implying that Wildwood takes place in our world's future. Meloy replied that this is not the case, and that he has "another story in mind" as to the origin of the Ghost Bridge, and that Wildwood is meant to be more or less contemporary with our time.

A stereotypical view of Portland's youth culture is expressed through Prue, Curtis and Prue's parents. Literary critic Anna Minard describes the kids as "bespectacled, bike-riding, vinyl-browsing, Kurosawa-referencing children." Descriptions of real elements of Portland are combined to create what critic Claire Dederer calls a "richly satisfying weave of reality and fantasy."

== Style ==
Wildwood echoes several classic fantasy and children's tales, notably J. R. R. Tolkien's Middle-earth books, The Chronicles of Narnia, The Wonderful Wizard of Oz, and Alice's Adventures in Wonderland. The kidnapping of a child by crows comes from Irish folktales of the Sluagh, and from Maurice Sendak's Outside Over There where a girl rescues her baby sister kidnapped by goblins. The literary tone of Decemberists songs is apparent in the writing style, with a weakness for the charms of archaic language and sesquipedalianism.

Wildwood is more soft fantasy than hard fantasy, in that historical and technological consistency and plausibility are not a high priority, giving the book a whimsical, or stream of consciousness, tone. The factions of The Wood use a variety of anachronistic technologies, including cutlasses, blunderbusses, and flintlocks, concurrent with howitzers and semi-automatic pistols, and vehicles like animal-drawn wagons and carts alongside bicycles, trucks and trains. No attempt was made to maintain a consistent level of technological advancement or to rationalize why a particular piece of equipment was used; rather, Meloy said, they could "pick coolest version of whatever piece of technology" they wanted, and Ellis said they "just picked whatever we liked." When she first meets the South Wood postman Richard, he threatens her with a shotgun, which in the same paragraph is referred to as a double-barrelled rifle, then on the next page it is called a shotgun again. Though the text pointedly mentions Prue's single-speed bicycle, the illustrations twice show her bike having derailleur gears, which are only present on multi-speed bikes.

=== Illustrations ===
Carson Ellis's illustrations, ever present on Decemberists album covers, are consistent with the folklore roots of the band's songs, love of nature, and romanticized historical periods, having a dark and playfully macabre tone reminiscent of Edward Gorey and Roald Dahl.

Carson Ellis's favorite Wildwood drawing, a badger pulling a rickshaw, was included in the story solely so she could draw it.

Ellis said that her favorite drawing among Wildwood's 85 illustrations is of a badger pulling a rickshaw, a relatively minor illustration compared with the full page color plates depicting pivotal scenes in the book. Meloy said that the scene it illustrated, of a friendly animal who appears at an opportune moment to offer Prue a ride after she escaped from captivity in the Pittock Mansion, was not vital to the plot, and an editor wanted to cut it from the book. But Meloy had written it specifically because he thought Ellis would enjoy drawing the badger and rickshaw, so he fought to keep it in. Booklist's Daniel Kraus highlighted the image as representative of the book, commenting, "If you like stories in which spunky kids emerge from secret tunnels only to be greeted by smartly outfitted badgers operating rickshaws, this is your book." Ellis commented, "That's one of the moments when the story seems really stream-of-consciousness. Prue pops up out of a manhole, and a badger comes by with a rickshaw and gives her a ride free of charge, and it's like, why not? It's such a great image."

=== Genre ===
Most news articles and book reviews call Wildwood a children's novel, or middle grade book, but some class it as young adult fiction (YA or YAL). HarperCollins recommended the book for ages 9 and up. The book's 541 page length was comparable to many of the books Meloy enjoyed at Wildwood's target age, and Ellis noted that "a 10 year old kid can be a voracious reader." The book is also marketed to adults, including Decemberists fans and adult fans of children's and young adult literature.

== Background ==
Meloy and Ellis first conceived the idea for the book before Meloy formed the indie folk-rock band The Decemberists in 2000. When they first moved to Portland, Meloy and Ellis were living in a warehouse where they "had this idea of working on a novel together ... because we enjoyed making up stories and playing off one another's creative impulses." Meloy was influenced by books that he read growing up, including Tolkien, and Lloyd Alexander's The Chronicles of Prydain. Meloy cites Piers Anthony's Xanth novels as a "direct influence", noting the "world within the real world and the implausibility of the whole enterprise". Ellis was influenced by The Chronicles of Narnia series as a child; the illustrations in the seven books of the Narnia series were a direct inspiration on her work. Unlike her previous work, where the text is completed before the illustrations are created, for Wildwood, Ellis collaborated with Meloy throughout the writing process.

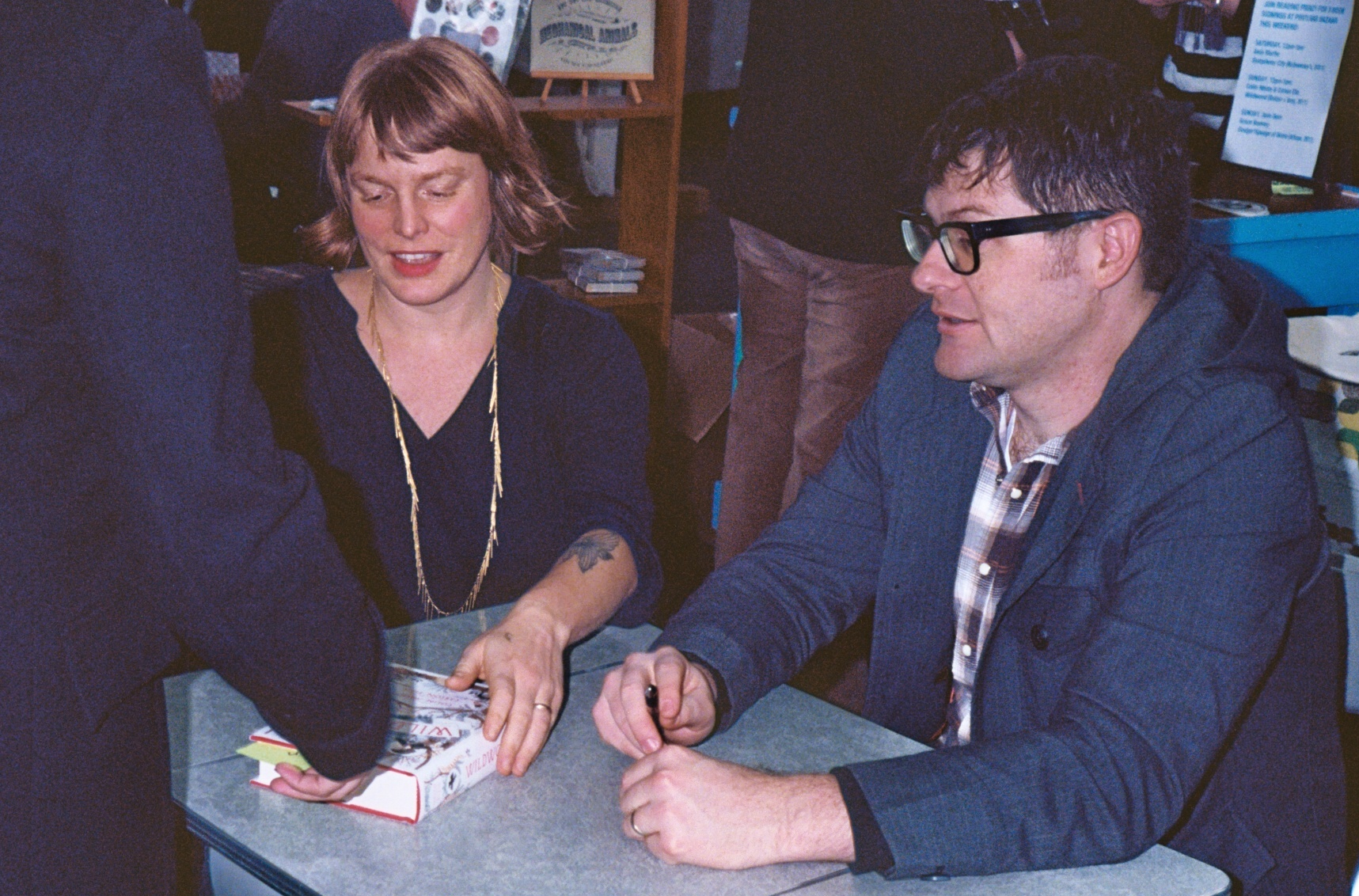
Carson Ellis and Colin Meloy at a book signing in Portland.

After writing the first 80 pages, Meloy put the book on hold for several years while he worked on his music and Ellis focused on her book illustrations. When work finally resumed on the novel, the title changed from How Ruthie Ended the War to Wildwood, the character of Ruthie became Prue, and the object of her quest changed from her lost father to her kidnapped brother. The early version of the story was, according to Meloy, "wildly inappropriate for children." Once they resumed work on the novel, Ellis said it took about two years to complete. Meloy feared his entry into fiction writing would be seen as "dabbling"; he wanted to avoid creating a "vanity project" like Madonna's picture books.

== Publication ==
Five publishers sought the rights to the Wildwood series before being won by the HarperCollins imprint Balzer + Bray, with a first print run of 250,000 copies.

The germ of the Wildwood idea was really always about taking Forest Park, which is this 5,000-acre park in the middle of Portland, and turning it into its own country, its own weird world that had to be accessed in some weird way [...] I really do think the main character of the book is Wildwood and its different provinces.

— Colin Meloy, in The Atlantic

Meloy and Ellis live on the edge of Forest Park and frequently hike its trails, where they found inspiration for geography of the series. Meloy and Ellis developed the idea for the impassable Wilderness from their experience in Forest Park, drawing maps of the fictional forest and using it to create the plot and characters. Illustrated endpapers in the book feature a large map of the forest with accompanying detail maps.

A special edition of the book (ISBN 9780062130280) was also printed: it is hand-bound, signed and numbered, with a slipcase and a three-color 15-by-12-inch (38 cm × 30 cm) fold-out map, among other additions.

== Reception ==
Wildwood was on The New York Times Best Seller Children's Chapter Books list for two weeks, ranking 7th the first week and 9th the second. The book won, in a tie with Colin Meloy's sister Maile Meloy's The Apothecary, the 2012 Middle Reader E.B. White Read Aloud Award.

Overall, the book received positive reactions. Critics praised the quality of the illustrations, noting the old-fashioned style of the hardcover edition with maps on the end papers and a select set of color plates. The A.V. Club's Tasha Robinson found the book, in spite of its flaws, "a perfect balance of middle-school-age-appropriate simplicity and more challenging writing that makes the book adult-accessible." Similarly, The New Yorker found that the use of familiar motifs were sometimes be "formulaic" but it was nonetheless a well told tale that was "never condescending", and that Meloy's original contribution to conventions of the genre was his allegorical exploration of contemporary political and military struggle, including diplomacy, revolution, and ethnic cleansing.

The most frequent criticism was that the pace dragged in some places, which some critics speculated was necessary setup for subsequent novels in the series. Some critics said they were "rankled" at the "arch" and "Portland-y" mention such local lifestyle tropes as cork flooring and recycling bins. Prue's riding to the final battle on her bicycle caused The New York Times's Claire Dederer to quip, "bicycle heroism: it doesn't get any more Portland than that." The regionalisms came on strong enough to bring to some critics' minds the Portlandia TV series that pokes fun at the oddities of Portland culture.

The Stirling Observer's Gregor White said that the story begins well, and agreed with other critics that the setting is an impressive work, but in sum judged that the book "somehow ends up as one big shoulder shrug of indifference." While other critics had reservations about the novel switching back and forth between the story threads of Prue and Curtis after they become separated early in the story, White said this "flitting back and forth" is an insurmountable "structural problem" that is "intensely wearing".

Rachel Brown of The Atlantic thought that "it makes perfect sense that Colin Meloy, the loquacious and imaginative lead singer of the quirky Portland-based rock band The Decemberists, would write a children's book." In contrast, critic Anna Minard from Seattle's The Stranger and Patrick Ness, in The Guardian, feared that Wildwood could be one more of a stream of "baldly mediocre books written by celebrities", citing children's books by Joy Behar, Jerry Seinfeld, Jimmy Fallon, Gloria Estefan, and Madonna. Minard and Ness also worried that the book would pander to adult Decemberists fans, while only "dressed trendily in kid-friendly wrapping," but Minard was pleasantly astonished that the book did none of these things, and was not a "vanity project", landing well in range of its middle reader target and avoiding the affected pitfalls of a pop musician as writer. Ness, noting the repetition of the adjective "suddenly" in one paragraph, hoped for tighter writing in future novels, but overall found the book successful and not the work of a "dilettante wanting to dabble." Coincidentally, Colin Meloy's sister, novelist Maile Meloy, also released a juvenile fiction book in 2011, saying, "I feel like everyone I know is writing one."

Stephen Heyman of The New York Times warned that Wildwood might be too violent for some readers, having many of the horrors so frequently found in Decemberists songs, including battles when people and animals die by musket and cannon fire, sword blows, and falling, and references to torture, and the threat of the blood sacrifice of a baby at the book's climax.

== Sequels ==
In 2011, Meloy said he intended to write at least two more books for the Wildwood Chronicles while his band, The Decemberists, were on hiatus. He planned the second Wildwood novel to have Prue return to The Wood, "her life very much in danger". The plot would involve "scheming industrialists trying to worm their way into Wood" from the Outside, and show a much "weirder Portland", with the supernatural not confined to The Wood. Meloy said he would no longer constrain the denizens of The Wood to the native species of Forest Park.

The second book in the series, Under Wildwood: The Wildwood Chronicles, Book Two, was released on September 25, 2012. The third and final book in the series, Wildwood Imperium, was released on February 4, 2014.

== Film adaptation ==
In 2011, Oregon-based animation studio Laika optioned Wildwood for a stop motion animated feature film and produced the trailer for the book. In 2021, Laika announced their next film would be Wildwood, with Travis Knight set to direct and Chris Butler writing the screenplay. On August 25, 2022, Carey Mulligan, Mahershala Ali, Peyton Elizabeth Lee, Jacob Tremblay, Angela Bassett, Jake Johnson, Charlie Day, Amandla Stenberg, Jemaine Clement, Maya Erskine, Tantoo Cardinal, Tom Waits and Richard E. Grant were all announced as part of the ensemble voice cast of the film. In 2023, director Travis Knight revealed in an interview with Empire that the film was due out in 2025, but the release had since been delayed until 2026. The film was released across the United States on October 23, 2026 with earnings of $53 million in the box office.
