= Wildwood Imperium =

2014 novel by Colin Meloy

Wildwood Imperium: The Wildwood Chronicles, Book 3
- Author: Colin Meloy
- Illustrator: Carson Ellis
- Cover artist: Carson Ellis
- Language: English
- Series: The Wildwood Chronicles
- Genre: Children's novel
- Publisher: Balzer + Bray
- Publication date: February 4, 2014
- Publication place: US
- Media type: Print (hardback, acid-free paper)
- Pages: 576
- ISBN: 978-0-06-202474-9
- OCLC: 904260441
- Preceded by: Under Wildwood

Wildwood Imperium: The Wildwood Chronicles, Book Three is a 2014 children's fantasy novel by The Decemberists' singer-songwriter Colin Meloy, illustrated by his wife Carson Ellis. The novel, the second sequel to Wildwood: The Wildwood Chronicles, Book One, continues the tale of Prue McKeel and her adventures in the "Impassable Wilderness," a fantastical version of Portland, Oregon's Forest Park. The natural beauty and local color of the city figure prominently. It was released on February 4, 2014.

It is currently the final book in The Wildwood Chronicles.

== Plot ==
The novel is set in a world filled with magical beings, secret rituals, and political intrigue. The plot follows multiple characters in their struggles against a powerful Ivy force that threatens to overtake their land.

Part One: In South Wood, a young girl named Zita is crowned May Queen and, along with friends, accidentally summons the spirit of Alexandra, the Dowager Governess, during a secret ritual. The spirit gives Zita a task to retrieve three items: an eagle feather, a pebble from Wildwood, and the teeth of the Governess’ son, Alexei, who is entombed in a mechanical body. Zita agrees to help, feeling sympathy for the Governess’ grief over her lost son.

Meanwhile, the Elder Mystic and other Mystics journey deep into Wildwood, where he disappears after being swallowed by the ground. In Portland, Esben the bear stays with Prue and her family, who set off to the Impassable Wilderness in search of a way to bring Alexei back to life. In South Wood, a new government led by the Blighted Tree Caliphs begins to gain control, with Roger Swindon at their head. The people, under a spell called Spongiform, are turned into obedient followers of the Blighted Tree. The orphans, led by Rachel, Elsie, and others, seek refuge in the Industrial Wastes, where they ally with the Chapeaux Noir, a resistance group aiming to topple the Titans of Industry.

Part Two: Prue is imprisoned on the Crag after refusing to eat the Spongiform, alongside former Bandit Seamus. In the Industrial Wastes, the orphans and their new allies launch an assault on Titan Tower, freeing Carol and Martha, but Joffrey Unthank is killed. Meanwhile, Zita completes the ritual to resurrect the Governess as a giant ivy woman.

In Wildwood, the orphans discover that Curtis, their missing brother, has recreated the Bandit Hideout in the trees and is now leading a secluded life. Prue, Seamus, and the group meet up in South Wood, where the Ivy has overtaken the land. Prue uses her plant manipulation abilities to free the Bandits from the Ivy’s influence. As the group fights off Ivy giants and other creatures, they head to North Wood to make a final stand.

Part Three: After realizing Carol is the other Maker, the group manages to reconstruct the Mobius Cog, which is used to bring Alexei back to life in his mechanical body. However, Alexei is despondent and agrees to help stop his mother, the Ivy. The group battles the Ivy forces, but the Blighted Tree is eventually destroyed, and the Ivy spreads across the land, overtaking Portland and the Industrial Wastes.

Alexei confronts his Ivy mother and forgives her, causing her to dissipate into the earth. Prue, with her powers, eventually manages to control the Ivy and contain it, though she disappears in the process. The Periphery Bind is restored, and a sapling known as the One Tree sprouts, signifying the rebirth of the land. Alexei, now living with Zita, helps govern the new land while the orphans of Unthank's Home are taken in by the Bandits and begin training as new members.

In Portland, Curtis is reunited with his parents, who now understand his commitment to the Bandits, and the family reconciles. Meanwhile, Prue, thought to be lost, reappears from a sapling growing in her parents' yard and shares her adventures with them, bringing closure to her journey.

== Iconography and real-life locations ==
Much of the iconography and locales included in the Wildwood series are derived from real locations in Portland. A mysterious stone house included in one chapter references "The Witch Castle", a now abandoned public bathroom in Forest Park that was partially destroyed by the Columbus Day Storm in 1962. It is commonly used as a resting point by hikers and joggers on the park's Wildwood Trail and has been the subject of innumerable local legends over the years. Among them: it was once the homestead of the former owner of the park and/or it used to be the home of a real-life witch. Despite its true history, the house has been used in several occult ceremonies since the storm and is often visited by members of Portland's goth community.

Other real locations featured in the book include Pittock Mansion, the St Johns neighborhood, Forest Park and the Willamette River.

== Reception ==
School Library Journal also gave the book a review. Common Sense Media gave the book a 4 out of 5 as a satisfying end to a highly original and whimsical fantasy to Wildwood.
