= Tarkio (band) =

Indie rock band from Missoula, Montana

- Origin: Missoula, Montana, United States
- Genres: Indie rock, alternative country, alternative rock
- Years active: 1996–1999
- Label: Kill Rock Stars
- Past members: Colin Meloy; Gibson Hartwell; Louis Stein; Brian Collins

Tarkio was an indie rock band from Missoula, Montana which included Colin Meloy prior to his forming The Decemberists. Tarkio broke up in 1999, but found new popularity in a retrospective released by Kill Rock Stars in 2006.

== History ==
Tarkio formed in Missoula, Montana in 1996. Meloy, from Helena, had studied English at University of Oregon at Eugene for two years, then returned and enrolled in the creative writing program at the University of Montana in Missoula. He recruited banjo player Gibson Hartwell, bassist Louis Stein, and drummer Brian Collins following a meeting at an open mic night at a local coffeehouse. The band took its name from Tarkio, Montana, a small town in the western part of the state. Pearl Jam bassist Jeff Ament helped out with some rehearsal space and the band built a following at bar-clubs in Missoula, Great Falls, Butte, and Whitefish, Montana.

In 1997, the band self-released a number of demos. Limited to 500 copies, this self-titled EP was followed by an album, I Guess I Was Hoping For Something More, released on Barcelona Records. This album included musician Kevin Suggs on pedal steel.

In 1999, the band self-released Sea Songs for Landlocked Sailors. Limited to 200 copies, the EP included a song that would later be re-recorded by the Decemberists, "My Mother Was a Chinese Trapeze Artist."

Meloy finished school in 1998.

As the Decemberists began to achieve more fame, fan demand for the hard-to-find Tarkio material grew, paving the way for Kill Rock Stars to release Omnibus. The two-disc compilation featured detailed liner notes and stories from members of the band, including Meloy, as well as all of the available recorded material by the band, including a live radio performance from 1998.

The band's sound has been variously compared to The Waterboys, Uncle Tupelo, and Wilco.

Meloy said of the early days:

“We [Tarkio] had aspirations of being able to base ourselves as a band out of Missoula, Montana, like Low is from Duluth and Modest Mouse is from Issaquah [Washington], but I think we pretty quickly discovered that the reason why those bands succeeded was that they were within an hour’s drive from a major metropolitan area.”

== Band members ==
- Colin Meloy - vocals, guitar
- Gibson Hartwell - guitar, banjo, vocals
- Louis Stein - bass, vocals
- Brian Collins - drums, percussion
- Kevin Suggs (pedal steel)

== Discography ==
=== Albums ===
- I Guess I Was Hoping For Something More (CD) - Barcelona Records - 1998
- Omnibus (CD) - Kill Rock Stars - 2006

=== EPs ===
- Falleness (Cassette) - Self-released - 1997
- Sea Songs For Landlocked Sailors (CD) - Self-released - 1999
