= Under Wildwood =

2012 novel by Colin Meloy

Under Wildwood: The Wildwood Chronicles, Book 2
- Author: Colin Meloy
- Illustrator: Carson Ellis
- Cover artist: Carson Ellis
- Language: English
- Series: The Wildwood Chronicles
- Genre: Children's novel
- Publisher: Balzer + Bray
- Publication date: September 25, 2012
- Publication place: US
- Media type: Print (hardback, acid-free paper)
- Pages: 576
- ISBN: 978-0-06-202471-8
- OCLC: 904260442
- Preceded by: Wildwood
- Followed by: Wildwood Imperium

Under Wildwood: The Wildwood Chronicles, Book Two is a 2012 children's fantasy novel by The Decemberists' singer-songwriter Colin Meloy, illustrated by his wife Carson Ellis. The 576-page novel, the sequel to Wildwood: The Wildwood Chronicles, Book One, continues the tale of Prue McKeel and her adventures in the "Impassable Wilderness," a fantastical version of Portland, Oregon's Forest Park. The natural beauty and local color of the city figure prominently. Ellis contributed 80 illustrations to the novel.

== Plot ==
Prue McKeel, having rescued her brother from the Dowager Governess at the conclusion of the first novel, returns to her normal daily life of school and daydreaming. She finds her mind drifting back to Wildwood as she becomes increasingly bored with her studies.

Meanwhile, dark events are transpiring in the Impassable Wilderness. A long, cold winter coupled with political discord have put Wildwood's residents on edge. Assassins are lurking in the forest's shadows, their intentions and motives unknown, while a tyrannical industrialist plots to exploit the natural resources of this magical world. Curtis and Brendan the Bandit King are warned of a nefarious plot by unknown forces to kill Prue. They arrive in Portland in time to rescue Prue before she is killed by a kitsune (shapeshifting fox) named Darla, who has been masquerading as Prue's teacher. They bring Prue back to the bandit camp hidden deep within Wildwood in order to protect her.

After the elder mystic, Iphigenia, is murdered by Darla, Prue travels to the Great Tree and learns that she must find "the Makers" and "re-animate the true heir, the twice-died boy". She quickly realizes that the Great Tree means Alexei, the Dowager Governess' son. She and Curtis are pursued by Darla and are horrified to discover the bandit camp destroyed, all of the bandits missing, upon their return. Prue, Curtis and the rat Septimus eventually find their way to a realm beneath the Wood inhabited entirely by moles. They help to overthrow a usurper and learn that one of the two Makers built the moles' underground city after he was banished by the Governess. After the friends make their way back above ground, they find him at a traveling carnival. Much to their surprise, he's a bear named Esben who, despite having two golden hooks in place of his front paws, has spent his many years in exile performing elaborate tricks in a circus tent. Esben kills Darla as she attempts to kill Prue.

In a parallel thread, Curtis' sisters Elsie and Rachel are left in a Portland orphanage while their parents travel to Istanbul to pursue a lead in their son's disappearance. The orphanage is a front for a machine shop run by Joffrey Unthank, an industrialist who is determined to find his way into the Impassable Wilderness and plunder its resources. Unthank is visited by a mysterious man named Roger Swindon, who promises access to the Wilderness if he can make a very complicated machine part called a Mobius Cog, which was originally crafted by the Makers. Unthank sends Elsie and Rachel and a third girl, Martha, into the Wilderness. There they discover dozens of previously exiled orphans living in a cabin with an elderly blind man named Carol.

Carol is the second Maker who, along with Esben, originally built the mechanical body in which the Governess brought Alexei back to life. The Governess had Carol's eyes poked out before banishing him to the Periphery Bind, a stretch of woods where those trying to enter the Woods find themselves lost forever. Time never passes there so the children have not aged. Elsie and Rachel soon discover that they can pass through the Bind. They take Carol and all of the orphans back to Portland, where they lead a revolt against Unthank. Elsie and Rachel escape, but Carol and Martha are captured by Unthank along with another industrialist, Bradley Wigman.

== Reception ==
The Oregonian praise the book over better writing and pacing that expands with familiar faces and worthy additions, moving beyond a "Fifty Shades of Narnia" tribute to a more fully realized narrative that blends the quirk and tremolo of Portland with the immersive pleasures of the fantasy tone. School Library Journal also gave the book a review. Common Sense Media gave the book a 3 out of 5 as it recaptures some, but not all, of the magic of its predecessor while falling short of the original.

== Sequel ==
The final book in the Wildwood trilogy, titled Wildwood Imperium, was released on February 4, 2014.
