= Colin Meloy =

American musician (born 1974)

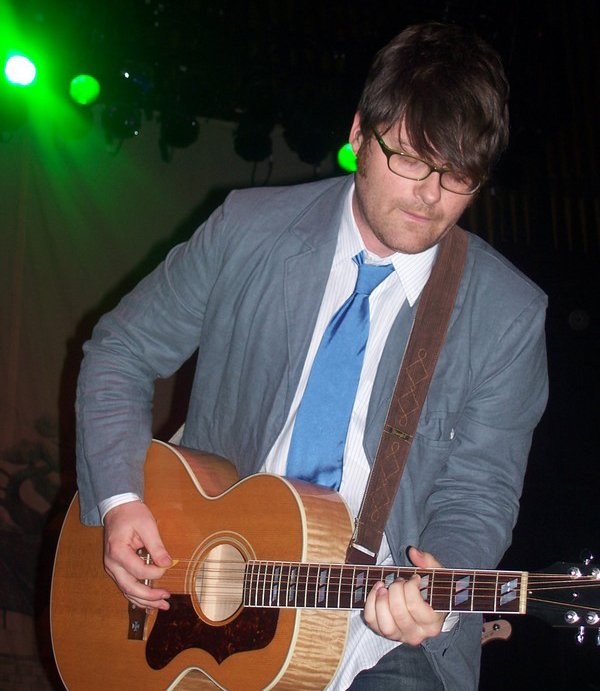
- Colin Meloy performing with The Decemberists in Atlanta (2006)

Background information
- Born: Colin Patrick Henry Meloy; October 5, 1974 (age 52); Helena, Montana, U.S.
- Genres: Indie rock, indie folk, folk rock, baroque pop, alternative country
- Occupations: Singer-songwriter, guitarist, author
- Instruments: Vocals, guitar, bouzouki, percussion, harmonica, keyboards
- Years active: 1990–present
- Labels: Kill Rock Stars; Capitol
- Member of: The Decemberists
- Formerly of: Tarkio, Happy Cactus
- Website: colinmeloy.com

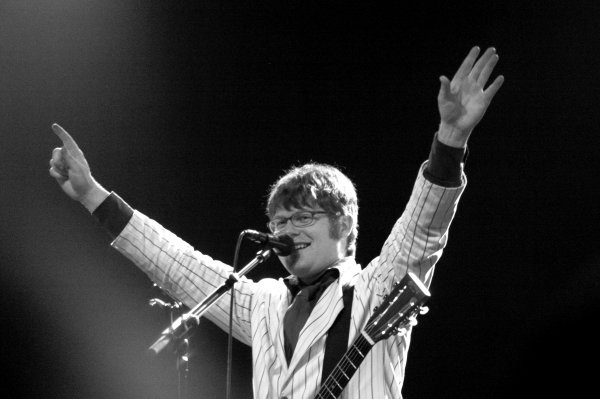
Meloy performing in Brussels (2007)

Colin Patrick Henry Meloy (born October 5, 1974) is an American musician, singer-songwriter and author best known as the frontman of the Portland, Oregon, indie folk rock band the Decemberists. In addition to vocals, he performs with an acoustic guitar, 12-string acoustic guitar, electric guitar, bouzouki, harmonica and percussion instruments. He wrote the novel Wildwood and contributed music to its film adaptation.

== Early life and education ==
Meloy was born in Helena, Montana. He attended the University of Oregon in Eugene for two years, studying English and theatre, before "a longing to be back in Montana" led him to study creative writing at the University of Montana in Missoula. After graduating in 1998 he left Montana again for Oregon.

== Musical career ==
While in high school, Meloy was in the band Happy Cactus, and when in college, in Missoula, he was the lead singer and songwriter for Tarkio. Both were indie/folk/alternative country bands. Soon after graduation, he left Tarkio and moved to Portland with the hope of establishing himself among the city's music scene. There, Meloy worked in a pizza parlor to pay rent while starting his musicianship anew by performing at various open mics, sometimes with no one listening except for the bartender. He later reflected in an interview with The Montanan that this experience helped to develop his musical style in the long run: "'When I was in that position, with nobody to appeal to or scare away, I thought, 'I might as well do whatever I want to do'...And that created a new thing.'"

The Decemberists formed in 2000 after Meloy met Nate Query, who introduced him to keyboardist Jenny Conlee, and the three scored a silent film together. Meloy had met multi-instrumentalist Chris Funk, who was a fan of Tarkio, at a solo show prior to meeting Conlee and Query. Since its formation, Meloy has served as the band's singer, guitarist, and principal songwriter. His work with The Decemberists thus far entails eight studio albums, ten EPs, twenty-two singles, two compilations, and two live albums.

In 2003 Meloy contributed vocals to the track "The Lady From Reims" on Reclinerland's The Ideal Home Music Library. Meloy also contributed vocals on the tracks "Cemetery Row" and "Twilight Distillery" on The Minus 5's 2006 Yep Roc release. Meloy covered the Elliott Smith song "Clementine" for a compilation of Portland, Oregon artists to support a children's charity, and in mid-2006, he contributed the track "Lazy Little Ada" on the Kill Rock Stars compilation, The Sound the Hare Heard. In 2007, Meloy lent his voice to an episode of Lil' Bush. He appeared with Charlie Salas-Humara in the music video for "A Pillar of Salt" by The Thermals.

In 2005, Meloy went on his first solo tour to support the self-released six-song EP, Colin Meloy Sings Morrissey, consisting of six Morrissey covers. Only 1000 copies of the album were made and they were sold only on this tour. Meloy did a second solo tour in January 2006, playing with Laura Veirs and Amy Annelle. On this tour, he sold an EP featuring covers of British folk artist Shirley Collins. 2006 tour performances were recorded for a live release.

Meloy contributed an online bonus track for Lavender Diamond on their Imagine Our Love album, performing a solo version of "Oh No".

Meloy began another solo tour in April 2008. This coincided with the release of his debut solo album, Colin Meloy Sings Live!, on the Kill Rock Stars label. Singer-songwriter Laura Gibson was the supporting act for the full tour. As with previous EPs, Meloy sold an EP only available on this run: Colin Meloy Sings Sam Cooke, a collection of five Sam Cooke songs, arranged and performed by Meloy, with Gibson singing harmonies.

Meloy appeared in the 2013 documentary film Another Day, Another Time: Celebrating the Music of "Inside Llewyn Davis", which detailed a one-off concert in New York City honoring traditional American folk music in preparation for the release of the Coen brothers' film Inside Llewyn Davis. The concert, organized by T Bone Burnett, featured several notable musicians representing multiple generations; Meloy performed a cover of Jackson C. Frank's "Blues Run the Game" as well as a version of "Joe Hill" alongside Joan Baez and Gillian Welch.

Meloy has jokingly described himself as "the King of Sad Sap Poets" in reference to his often somber lyrics.

== Literary career ==
In 2004, Meloy wrote a 100-page book about The Replacements' third album, Let It Be, released as part of the 33 1/3 series.

In 2010, Meloy wrote a short story, The Grievous Demise of Mr. Whitley Rackham, illustrated by his wife, Carson Ellis, and published as a limited (200 copies), numbered letterpress edition.

Meloy made his debut as a children's writer with Wildwood, also illustrated by Ellis. He kicked off the book tour as the keynote of the AJC Decatur Book Festival on September 2, 2011. Meloy released a sequel, Under Wildwood, in 2012, and the third book in the series, Wildwood Imperium, was released in 2014.

In October 2017, Meloy released his fourth children's book, The Whiz Mob and the Grenadine Kid, also illustrated by Ellis.

In September 2022, Meloy released his fifth children's book, The Stars Did Wander Darkling.

Meloy has also released two picture books, The Golden Thread: A Song for Pete Seeger (2018), illustrated by Nikki McClure, and Everyone's Awake (2020).

== Television ==
In the 2014 two-part episode of Parks and Recreation entitled "Moving Up: Part 1" and "Moving Up: Part 2", Meloy made a cameo appearance as himself with the rest of The Decemberists at the Unity Concert along with other notable artists such as Jeff Tweedy, Ginuwine, and Yo La Tengo.

== Personal life ==
On February 24, 2006, Carson Ellis, Meloy's wife, gave birth to a son, Henry "Hank" Meloy. Ellis shares her birthday with Meloy, and produces much of The Decemberists' album and promotional artwork. Meloy's son Hank has autism spectrum disorder (ASD). On March 14, 2013, Ellis gave birth to another child, Milo Cannonball Meloy.

Meloy's sister is Maile Meloy, a fiction writer often published in The New Yorker and The New York Times, and his aunt is Ellen Meloy, who was also a writer.

== Work with The Decemberists ==
See: The Decemberists discography

== Solo discography ==
- Colin Meloy Sings Morrissey (2005)
- Colin Meloy Sings Shirley Collins (2006)
- Colin Meloy Sings Live! (2008)
- Colin Meloy Sings Sam Cooke (2008)
- Colin Meloy Sings The Kinks (2013)
