= Morrissey discography =

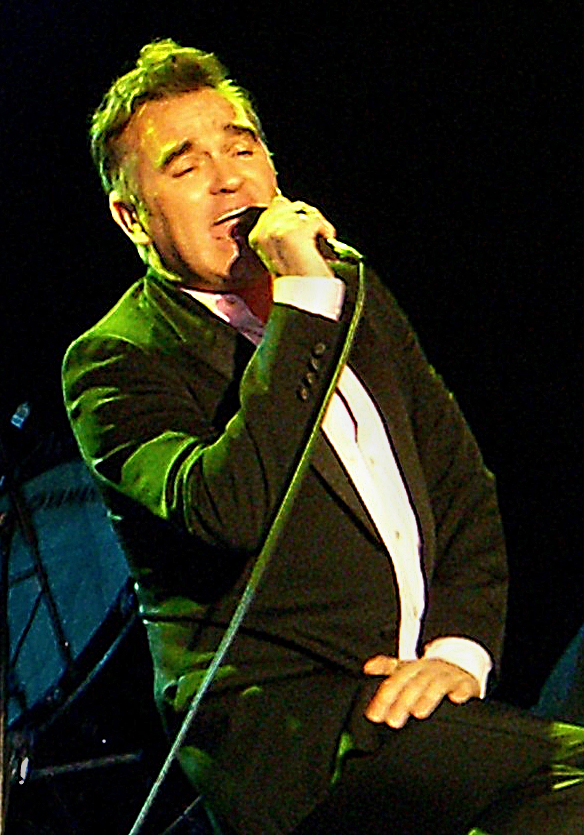
- Morrissey during a 2006 concert in Austin, Texas
- Studio albums: 14
- Extended plays: 3
- Live albums: 2
- Compilation albums: 12
- Singles: 71
- Video albums: 7
- Music videos: 43
- Unreleased albums: 1

This is a discography for the English alternative rock singer Morrissey. Since the Smiths disbanded in 1987 he has released 14 studio albums, 2 live albums, 12 compilation albums, 3 extended plays (EPs), 71 singles and 7 video albums on His Master's Voice, Parlophone, Polydor, RCA Victor, Island, Mercury, Sanctuary Records, EMI, Reprise Records, Rhino, Decca Records, Harvest Records, Capitol Music Group BMG, Sire Records

== Albums ==
=== Studio albums ===
Year	Title	Peak chart positions										Certifications
Year	Title	UK	AUS	CAN	FRA	GER	IRL	NLD	SWE	SWI	US	Certifications
1988	Viva Hate: Released: 14 March 1988; Labels: His Master's Voice, Sire; Formats: CD, LP, Cassette	1	21	32	—	33	—	12	27	—	48	UK: Gold; US: Gold
1991	Kill Uncle: Released: 5 March 1991; Labels: His Master's Voice, Sire; Formats: CD, LP, Cassette	8	45	53	—	—	—	61	27	—	52	UK: Silver
1992	Your Arsenal: Released: 27 July 1992; Labels: His Master's Voice, Sire; Formats: CD, LP, Cassette	4	12	28	—	—	11	76	42	—	21	
1994	Vauxhall and I: Released: 14 March 1994; Labels: Parlophone, Sire; Formats: LP, CD	1	21	22	12	—	5	73	13	—	18	UK: Gold
1995	Southpaw Grammar: Released: 28 August 1995; Labels: RCA Victor, Sire; Formats: CD, LP, Cassette	4	74	35	33	—	7	79	14	—	66	UK: Silver
1997	Maladjusted: Released: 11 August 1997; Labels: Island, Mercury; Formats: CD, LP, Cassette	8	62	70	27	76	—	—	10	—	61	
2004	You Are the Quarry: Released: 17 May 2004; Label: Sanctuary; Formats: CD, LP	2	64	37	21	7	3	30	1	63	11	UK: Platinum
2006	Ringleader of the Tormentors: Released: 3 April 2006; Label: Sanctuary; Formats: CD, LP, digital download	1	55	41	38	9	3	22	1	44	27	UK: Gold
2009	Years of Refusal: Released: 16 February 2009; Labels: Decca, Polydor; Formats: CD, LP, DD	3	87	36	29	4	12	52	5	32	11	UK: Silver
2014	World Peace Is None of Your Business: Released: 15 July 2014; Labels: Harvest, Capitol; Formats: CD, LP, DD	2	58	—	53	8	4	28	29	30	14	
2017	Low in High School: Released: 17 November 2017; Labels: BMG, Etienne; Formats: CD, LP, DD, Cassette	5	81	—	71	15	8	40	29	36	20	
2019	California Son: Released: 24 May 2019; Labels: BMG, Etienne; Formats: CD, LP, DD	4	—	—	66	13	27	97	—	32	95	
2020	I Am Not a Dog on a Chain: Released: 20 March 2020; Label: BMG; Formats: CD, LP, DD, Cassette	3	—	—	—	13	47	80	—	56	—	
2026	Make-Up Is a Lie: Released: 6 March 2026; Label: Sire; Formats: CD, LP, DD	3	—	—	42	9	27	48	—	15	-	
"—" denotes releases that did not chart.

=== Live albums ===
Year	Title	Peak chart positions			
Year	Title	UK	FRA	SWE	US
1993	Beethoven Was Deaf: Released: 10 May 1993; Label: His Master's Voice; Formats: LP, CD	13	—	—	—
2005	Live at Earls Court: Released: 29 March 2005; Label: Sanctuary; Format: CD	18	110	16	119
"—" denotes releases that did not chart.

=== Compilation albums ===
Year	Title	Peak chart positions					Certifications
Year	Title	UK	AUS	CAN	SWE	US	Certifications
1990	Bona Drag: Released: 15 October 1990; Labels: His Master's Voice, Sire; Formats: LP, cassette, CD	9	57	73	—	59	UK: Silver; US: Gold
1995	World of Morrissey: Released: 6 February 1995; Labels: Parlophone, Sire; Format: LP, CD	15	—	—	45	134	
1997	Suedehead: The Best of Morrissey: Released: 8 September 1997; Label: EMI; Format: CD	25^{[A]}	—	—	—	—	UK: Gold
1998	My Early Burglary Years: Released: September 1998; Label: Reprise; Format: CD	—	—	—	—	—	
2000	The CD Singles '88–91': Released: 19 June 2000; Label: EMI; Format: 10×CD single box set	—	—	—	—	—	
2001	The CD Singles '91–95': Released: 17 September 2001; Label: EMI; Format: 9×CD single box set	—	—	—	—	—	
2001	The Best of Morrissey: Released: 6 November 2001; Label: Rhino; Format: CD, LP	—	—	—	—	—	
2008	Greatest Hits: Released: 11 February 2008; Label: Decca; Formats: CD, LP	5	—	—	16	178	UK: Gold
2009	The HMV/Parlophone Singles '88–'95: Released: 12 October 2009; Label: EMI; Formats: CD, digital download	—	—	—	—	—	
2009	Swords: Released: 26 October 2009; Label: Polydor; Formats: CD, LP	55	—	—	—	—	
2011	Very Best of Morrissey: Released: 25 April 2011; Label: Major Minor; Formats: CD, LP	80	—	—	—	—	
2018	This Is Morrissey: Released: 6 July 2018; Labels: Regal, Parlophone, Sire; Formats: CD, LP	—	—	—	—	—	

- A Chart position for the 2004 re-entry; the 1997 chart position was number 26.

=== Unreleased albums ===
Year	Title
N/A	Bonfire of Teenagers: Planned release: February 2023; Label: Capitol

=== Other album appearances ===
Year	Song	Album	Notes
1992	"Tomorrow" (Steve Peck Mix)	Volume 5	An alternate mix of the 1992 single.
2006	"First of the Gang to Die"	Music from Glastonbury the Film	A live version from 2004.
2006	"Suedehead" (Sparks Mix)	Future Retro	An alternate mix of the 1988 single, only available on the CD version of the album.

=== Other albums with Morrissey involvement ===
Under the Influence

- Released: 26 May 2003
- Label: DMC
- Format: CD, LP

Morrissey Curates The Ramones

- Released: November 28, 2014
- Label: Rhino
- Formats: LP

== Extended plays ==
Year	Title
1991	At KROQ: Released: 18 September 1991; Label: Sire/Reprise; Format: CD
2004	Sessions@AOL: Released: 28 September 2004; Label: Sanctuary; Format: digital download
2026	Deluxe Notre-Dame: Released: 19 June 2026; Label: Sire; Format: 12" Vinyl

== Singles ==
Year	Title	Peak chart positions											Certifications	Album
Year	Title	UK	AUS	CAN	DEN	FIN	FRA	IRL	NLD	SWE	US	US Alt	Certifications	Album
1988	"Suedehead"	5	45	—	—	18	—	2	30	—	—	—		Viva Hate
1988	"Everyday Is Like Sunday"	9	—	—	—	—	—	3	76	—	—	—	UK: Silver	Viva Hate
1989	"The Last of the Famous International Playboys"	6	68	—	—	20	—	3	—	—	—	3		Bona Drag
1989	"Interesting Drug"	9	111	—	—	—	—	4	—	—	—	11		Bona Drag
1989	"Ouija Board, Ouija Board"	18	—	—	—	13	—	4	—	—	—	2		Bona Drag
1990	"November Spawned a Monster"	12	—	—	—	—	—	9	—	—	—	6		Bona Drag
1990	"Piccadilly Palare"	18	152	—	—	—	—	5	—	—	—	2		Bona Drag
1991	"Our Frank"	26	127	—	—	26	—	7	—	—	—	2		Kill Uncle
1991	"Sing Your Life"	33	190	—	—	—	—	21	—	—	—	10		Kill Uncle
1991	"Pregnant for the Last Time"	25	71	—	—	—	—	9	—	—	—	—		Non-album single
1991	"My Love Life"	29	153	—	—	—	—	6	—	—	—	—		Non-album single later included on World of Morrissey
1992	"We Hate It When Our Friends Become Successful"	17	55	—	—	—	—	9	—	—	—	2		Your Arsenal
1992	"You're the One for Me, Fatty"	19	85	—	—	—	—	16	—	—	—	—		Your Arsenal
1992	"Tomorrow"	—	—	—	—	—	—	—	—	—	—	1		Your Arsenal
1992	"Certain People I Know"	35	104	—	—	—	—	—	—	—	—	—		Your Arsenal
1994	"The More You Ignore Me, the Closer I Get"	8	85	34	—	—	42	24	—	—	46	1		Vauxhall and I
1994	"Hold On to Your Friends"	48	170	—	—	—	—	—	—	—	—	—		Vauxhall and I
1994	"Interlude" (with Siouxsie Sioux)	25	129	—	—	—	—	25	—	—	—	—		Non-album single
1994	"Now My Heart Is Full"	—	—	—	—	—	—	—	—	—	—	—		Vauxhall and I
1995	"Boxers"	23	163	—	—	—	—	19	—	—	^{[B]}	—		World of Morrissey
1995	"Dagenham Dave"	26	133	—	—	—	—	28	—	—	—	—		Southpaw Grammar
1995	"The Boy Racer"	36	—	—	—	—	—	—	—	—	—	—		Southpaw Grammar
1995	"Sunny"	42	—	—	—	—	—	—	—	42	—	—		Non-album single
1997	"Alma Matters"	16	97	—	—	—	—	—	—	50	^{[C]}	—		Maladjusted
1997	"Roy's Keen"	42	—	—	—	—	—	—	—	—	—	—		Maladjusted
1997	"Satan Rejected My Soul"	39	—	—	—	—	—	—	—	—	—	—		Maladjusted
2004	"Irish Blood, English Heart"	3	—	7	—	—	66	17	—	4	—	36		You Are the Quarry
2004	"First of the Gang to Die"	6	—	57	—	—	—	26	90	20	—	—	UK: Silver	You Are the Quarry
2004	"Let Me Kiss You"	8	—	—	—	—	—	44	—	19	—	—		You Are the Quarry
2004	"I Have Forgiven Jesus"	10	—	—	—	—	—	45	—	33	—	—		You Are the Quarry
2005	"There Is a Light That Never Goes Out" / "Redondo Beach"^{[D]}	11	—	—	—	—	—	45	—	33	—	—		Live at Earls Court
2006	"You Have Killed Me"	3	—	3	3	5	69	9	58	8	—	—		Ringleader of the Tormentors
2006	"The Youngest Was the Most Loved"	14	—	—	6	12	—	20	—	26	—	—		Ringleader of the Tormentors
2006	"In the Future When All's Well"	17	—	—	—	—	—	35	—	20	—	—		Ringleader of the Tormentors
2006	"I Just Want to See the Boy Happy"	16	—	—	—	14	—	50	—	—	—	—		Ringleader of the Tormentors
2008	"That's How People Grow Up"	14	—	—	—	—	—	27	—	26	—	—		Greatest Hits
2008	"All You Need Is Me"	24	—	—	—	—	—	—	—	—	—	—		Greatest Hits
2009	"I'm Throwing My Arms Around Paris"	21	—	—	—	—	26	—	—	58	—	—		Years of Refusal
2009	"Something Is Squeezing My Skull"	46	—	—	—	—	35	—	—	—	—	—		Years of Refusal
2010	"Everyday Is Like Sunday" (re-issue)	42	—	—	—	—	43	—	—	—	—	—	UK: Silver	Bona Drag (2010 Remaster)
2011	"Glamorous Glue"^{[E]}	69	—	—	—	—	—	—	—	—	—	—		Your Arsenal / Very Best of Morrissey
2012	"Suedehead" (Mael Mix)	—	—	—	—	—	—	—	—	—	—	—		Non-album singles later included on This is Morrissey
2013	"The Last of the Famous International Playboys" (re-issue)	—	—	—	—	—	—	—	—	—	—	—		Non-album singles later included on This is Morrissey
2013	"Satellite of Love" (live)	—	—	—	—	—	—	—	—	—	—	—		Non-album singles later included on This is Morrissey
2014	"World Peace Is None of Your Business"	83	—	—	—	—	—	—	—	—	—	—		World Peace Is None of Your Business
2014	"Istanbul"	—	—	—	—	—	—	—	—	—	—	—		World Peace Is None of Your Business
2014	"Earth Is the Loneliest Planet"	—	—	—	—	—	—	—	—	—	—	—		World Peace Is None of Your Business
2014	"The Bullfighter Dies"	—	—	—	—	—	—	—	—	—	—	—		World Peace Is None of Your Business
2015	"Kiss Me a Lot"	—	—	—	—	—	—	—	—	—	—	—		World Peace Is None of Your Business
2017	"Spent the Day in Bed"	69	—	—	—	—	—	—	—	—	—	—		Low in High School
2017	"Jacky's Only Happy When She's Up on the Stage"	—	—	—	—	—	—	—	—	—	—	—		Low in High School
2018	"My Love, I'd Do Anything for You"	—	—	—	—	—	—	—	—	—	—	—		Low in High School
2018	"All the Young People Must Fall in Love"	—	—	—	—	—	—	—	—	—	—	—		Low in High School
2018	"Back on the Chain Gang"	—	—	—	—	—	—	—	—	—	—	—		Low in High School (Deluxe Edition)
2019	"Lover-to-Be"	—	—	—	—	—	—	—	—	—	—	—		Low in High School (Deluxe Edition)
2019	"Wedding Bell Blues"	—	—	—	—	—	—	—	—	—	—	—		California Son
2019	"It's Over"	—	—	—	—	—	—	—	—	—	—	—		California Son
2020	"Bobby, Don't You Think They Know?" (with Thelma Houston)	—	—	—	—	—	—	—	—	—	—	—		I Am Not a Dog on a Chain
2020	"Love Is On Its Way Out"	—	—	—	—	—	—	—	—	—	—	—		I Am Not a Dog on a Chain
2020	"Knockabout World"	—	—	—	—	—	—	—	—	—	—	—		I Am Not a Dog on a Chain
2020	"Honey, You Know Where to Find Me"	—	—	—	—	—	—	—	—	—	—	—		Southpaw Grammar (2009 Remastered)
2021	"Cosmic Dancer" (live with David Bowie) / "That's Entertainment"^{[D]}	—	—	—	—	—	—	—	—	—	—	—		"Sing Your Life" single^{[F]}
2022	"Rebels Without Applause"	—	—	—	—	—	—	—	—	—	—	—		Non-album single (Note: "Rebels Without Applause" was originally announced as the lead single from the forthcoming album Bonfire of Teenagers. The album was not issued, and remains unreleased.)
2024	"Interlude" (with Siouxsie Sioux; re-issue)	—	—	—	—	—	—	—	—	—	—	—		Non-album single
2026	"Make-Up Is a Lie"	—	—	—	—	—	—	—	—	—	—	—		Make-Up Is a Lie
2026	"Notre-Dame"	— (Note: "Notre-Dame" did not enter the UK Singles Chart, but debuted at number 72 on the UK Singles Sales Chart.)	—	—	—	—	—	—	—	—	—	—		Make-Up Is a Lie
2026	"Amazona"	—	—	—	—	—	—	—	—	—	—	—		Make-Up Is a Lie
2026	"The Monsters of Pig Alley"	—	—	—	—	—	—	—	—	—	—	—		Make-Up Is a Lie
2026	"Happy New Tears"	—	—	—	—	—	—	—	—	—	—	—		Deluxe Notre-Dame
2026	"Kerching Kerching"	—	—	—	—	—	—	—	—	—	—	—		Make-Up Is a Lie
2026	"Zoom Zoom the Little Boy"	—	—	—	—	—	—	—	—	—	—	—		Make-Up Is a Lie

- B Though it did not chart on the Billboard Hot 100, "Boxers" reached number 18 on the Bubbling Under charts in the US.
- C Though it did not chart on the Billboard Hot 100, "Alma Matters" reached number nine on the Bubbling Under charts in the US.
- D Double A-side.
- E "Glamorous Glue" was originally from the 1992 album Your Arsenal. It was not released as a single in 1992 (in any format, in any country), but made it to number 13 on the US Modern Rock charts as an album track that year. The UK chart position is for the 2011 UK single release, done to promote the Very Best of Morrissey compilation.
- F "That's Entertainment" was originally released as the B-side of the single "Sing Your Life" in 1991. This version uses different instrumentation but retains the original vocal (with some new vocals added) as the B-side version.

=== Songs as featured artist ===
Year	Song	Artist	Peak chart positions
Year	Song	Artist	UK
1984	"Jeane"	Sandie Shaw	—
2004	"Let Me Kiss You"	Nancy Sinatra	46

== Videos ==
Year	Title	Certification
1990	Hulmerist: Released: 1990; Label: EMI; Format: VHS, DVD	US: Gold
1991	Sing Your Life (EP): Released: 1991; Label: EMI (Japan); Format: VHS	
1992	Live in Dallas: Released: 1992; Label: WEA; Format: VHS, DVD	
1992	The Malady Lingers On: Released: 1992; Label: EMI; Format: VHS, DVD	
1996	Introducing Morrissey: Released: 1996 / 2014 (DVD); Label: WEA; Format: VHS, DVD	
2000	¡Oye Esteban!: Released: 2000; Label: WEA; Format: DVD	
2005	Who Put the M in Manchester?: Released: 2005; Label: Sanctuary; Format: DVD, UMD	UK: Gold
2013	Morrissey: 25 Live: Released: 2013; Label: Eagle Rock; Format: DVD, Blu-ray	

== Music videos ==
Year	Title	Director(s)
1988	"Suedehead"	Tim Broad
1988	"Everyday Is Like Sunday"	Tim Broad
1989	"The Last of the Famous International Playboys"	Tim Broad
1989	"Interesting Drug"	Tim Broad
1989	"Ouija Board, Ouija Board"	Tim Broad
1990	"November Spawned a Monster"	Tim Broad
1991	"Our Frank"	John Maybury
1991	"Sing Your Life"	Tim Broad
1991	"Pregnant for the Last Time"	Tim Broad
1991	"My Love Life"	Tim Broad
1992	"We Hate It When Our Friends Become Successful"	Tim Broad
1992	"You're the One for Me, Fatty"	Tim Broad
1992	"Certain People I Know"	George Tiffin
1992	"Tomorrow"	Zack Snyder (2 versions)
1992	"Glamorous Glue"	George Tiffin
1994	"The More You Ignore Me, The Closer I Get"	Mark Romanek
1995	"Boxers"	James O'Brien
1995	"Dagenham Dave"	James O'Brien
1995	"The Boy Racer"	James O'Brien
1995	"Sunny"	James O'Brien
1997	"Alma Matters"	Matthew Rolston
2004	"Irish Blood, English Heart"	AV Club
2004	"First of the Gang to Die"	AV Club
2004	"I Have Forgiven Jesus"	AV Club
2005	"There Is a Light That Never Goes Out"	
2006	"You Have Killed Me"	AV Club
2006	"The Youngest Was the Most Loved"	AV Club
2006	"In the Future When All's Well"	AV Club
2008	"That's How People Grow Up"	
2008	"All You Need Is Me"	Patrick O'Dell
2009	"I'm Throwing My Arms Around Paris"	Travis Shinn
2014	"World Peace Is None of Your Business"	Natalie Johns
2014	"Istanbul"	Natalie Johns
2014	"Earth Is the Loneliest Planet"	Natalie Johns
2014	"The Bullfighter Dies"	Natalie Johns
2015	"Kiss Me A Lot"	Sam Esty Rayner
2017	"Spent the Day in Bed"	Sophie Muller
2017	"Jacky's Only Happy When She's Up on the Stage"	Robert Hales
2018	"Back on the Chain Gang"	Liam Lynch
2020	"Cosmic Dancer" (live with David Bowie)	Tim Broad
2026	"The Monsters of Pig Alley"	Lewis Cater
2026	"Kerching Kerching"	Lewis Cater
2026	"Zoom Zoom the Little Boy"	

== See also ==
- The Smiths discography
