= ¡Oye Esteban! =

Video by Morrissey
- Released: 2000
- Genre: Alternative rock
- Length: 70 minutes
- Label: Warner Reprise Video

Morrissey chronology
Introducing Morrissey (1996)	¡Oye Esteban! (2000)	Who Put the M in Manchester? (2005)

¡Oye Esteban! ("Hey Steven!" in Spanish) is a compilation of music videos by Morrissey. It has been released on DVD.

== Reception ==
¡Oye Esteban! was positively reviewed by Tim DiGravina of AllMusic who said it was "a package that drips with a style and grace that would make Morrissey proud."

== Track listing ==
1. "Everyday Is Like Sunday"
2. "Suedehead"
3. "Will Never Marry" (Live)
4. "November Spawned a Monster"
5. "Interesting Drug"
6. "The Last of the Famous International Playboys"
7. "My Love Life"
8. "Sing Your Life"
9. "Seasick, Yet Still Docked"
10. "We Hate It When Our Friends Become Successful"
11. "Glamorous Glue"
12. "Tomorrow"
13. "You're the One for Me, Fatty"
14. "The More You Ignore Me, the Closer I Get"
15. "Pregnant for the Last Time"
16. "Boxers"
17. "Dagenham Dave"
18. "The Boy Racer"
19. "Sunny"
20. Credits
