= My Early Burglary Years =

Compilation album by Morrissey
- Released: 15 September 1998
- Recorded: 1987–1995
- Length: 58:11
- Label: Reprise

Morrissey chronology
| Suedehead: The Best of Morrissey (1997) | My Early Burglary Years (1998) | The CD Singles '88–91' (2000) |

Professional ratings
Review scores
| Source | Rating |
|---|---|
| Allmusic | link |

My Early Burglary Years is a compilation album by Morrissey that was released in September 1998 in the United States on Reprise Records. It follows in the tradition of his previous compilation albums Bona Drag and World of Morrissey in that it collects various single A-sides and B-sides, some album tracks, live tracks and previously unreleased material.

== Track listing ==
All tracks written by Morrissey and Alain Whyte except where noted.

| No. | Title | Writer(s) | Original release | Length |
|---|---|---|---|---|
| 1. | "Sunny" | | Single A-side | 2:43 |
| 2. | "At Amber" | Morrissey, Stephen Street | B-side of "Piccadilly Palare" | 2:44 |
| 3. | "Cosmic Dancer" (live in Costa Mesa, June 1, 1991; T. Rex cover) | Marc Bolan | Previously unreleased | 3:56 |
| 4. | "Nobody Loves Us" | | B-side of "Dagenham Dave" | 4:50 |
| 5. | "A Swallow on My Neck" | | B-side of "Sunny" | 2:50 |
| 6. | "Sister I'm a Poet" | Morrissey, Street | B-side of "Everyday Is Like Sunday" | 2:27 |
| 7. | "Black-Eyed Susan" | | B-side of "Sunny" | 4:07 |
| 8. | "Michael's Bones" | Morrissey, Street | B-side of "The Last of the Famous International Playboys" | 3:08 |
| 9. | "I'd Love To" | Morrissey, Boz Boorer | B-side of The More You Ignore Me, The Closer I Get" | 4:50 |
| 10. | "Reader Meet Author" | Morrissey, Boorer | Southpaw Grammar | 3:42 |
| 11. | "Pashernate Love" | Morrissey, Whyte & Gary Day | B-side of "You're the One for Me, Fatty" | 2:23 |
| 12. | "Girl Least Likely To" | Morrissey, Andy Rourke | B-side of "November Spawned a Monster" | 4:51 |
| 13. | "Jack the Ripper" (live in Paris, December 22, 1992) | Morrissey, Boorer | Beethoven was Deaf | 4:11 |
| 14. | "I've Changed My Plea to Guilty" | Morrissey, Mark E. Nevin | Edited version of B-side of "My Love Life" | 3:14 |
| 15. | "The Boy Racer" | | Southpaw Grammar | 4:45 |
| 16. | "Boxers" | | Single A-side | 3:30 |
