= Very Best of Morrissey =

Compilation album by Morrissey
- Released: 25 April 2011
- Recorded: 1987–1994
- Genre: Alternative rock, indie rock
- Length: 75:13
- Label: Major Minor; EMI

Morrissey chronology
| Swords (2009) | Very Best of Morrissey (2011) | World Peace Is None of Your Business (2014) |

Very Best of Morrissey is a compilation album by Morrissey, containing material he released during the 1980s and 1990s on EMI. It was released on 25 April 2011.

== About the album ==
The album covers material released between his 1988 debut album Viva Hate and his 1995 single "Boxers". The track listing bears a slight resemblance to that of 1997's Suedehead: The Best of Morrissey. The album also features a solo version of "Interlude" without Siouxsie Sioux. Strangely, it includes just one track from 1994's Vauxhall and I, Morrissey's commercial and critical high watermark. All tracks have been remastered for the album. The album did not chart in the top 75 but did reach number 80 on the UK Albums Chart.

== Release and promotion ==
In promotion of the album, the single "Glamorous Glue" from Your Arsenal was re-issued on CD and 7" vinyl. It charted at number 69 on the UK singles chart, replacing "Hold On to Your Friends" as Morrissey's lowest charting single. It was the last Morrissey single to chart in the UK top 75, until "Spent the Day in Bed" also charted at 69 six years later.

== Track listing ==
1. "The Last of the Famous International Playboys" – 3:39
2. "You're Gonna Need Someone on Your Side" – 3:35
3. "The More You Ignore Me, the Closer I Get" – 3:42
4. "Glamorous Glue" – 4:04
5. "Girl Least Likely To" – 4:48
6. "Suedehead" – 3:52
7. "Tomorrow" (US mix) – 3:55
8. "Boxers" – 3:23
9. "My Love Life" – 4:48
10. "Break Up the Family" – 3:47
11. "I've Changed My Plea to Guilty" – 3:38
12. "Such a Little Thing Makes Such a Big Difference" – 2:50
13. "Ouija Board, Ouija Board" – 3:46
14. "Interesting Drug" – 3:19
15. "November Spawned a Monster" – 5:23
16. "Everyday Is Like Sunday" – 3:32
17. "Interlude" (solo version) – 3:39
18. "Moonriver" – 9:38

Bonus DVD

1. "The Last of the Famous International Playboys" – 3:38
2. "The More You Ignore Me, the Closer I Get" – 3:46
3. "Glamorous Glue" – 4:03
4. "Suedehead" – 3:54
5. "Tomorrow" – 3:59
6. "Boxers" – 4:23
7. "My Love Life" – 4:25
8. "I've Changed My Plea to Guilty" (taken from the Tonight with Jonathan Ross Show, December 1990) – 3:29
9. "Interesting Drug" – 3:54
10. "November Spawned a Monster" – 5:24
11. "Everyday Is Like Sunday" – 3:36
12. "Sunny" – 2:39

== Etchings on vinyl ==
UK LP: ASK FOR TOUGHEY
