= The Best of Morrissey =

Greatest hits album by Morrissey
- Released: 2001
- Genre: Alternative rock
- Length: 78:11
- Label: Rhino

Morrissey chronology
The CD Singles '88–91' (2000)	The Best of Morrissey (2001)	You Are the Quarry (2004)

Professional ratings
Review scores
Source	Rating
AllMusic	link
Blender	link

The Best of Morrissey is a 2001 compilation album by Morrissey.

== Track listing ==
1. "The More You Ignore Me, the Closer I Get" – 3:43
2. "Suedehead" – 3:54
3. "Everyday Is Like Sunday" – 3:32
4. "Glamorous Glue" – 4:08
5. "Do Your Best and Don't Worry" – 4:07
6. "November Spawned a Monster" – 5:23
7. "The Last of the Famous International Playboys" – 3:39
8. "Sing Your Life" – 3:26
9. "Hairdresser on Fire" – 3:50
10. "Interesting Drug" – 3:27
11. "We Hate It When Our Friends Become Successful" – 2:30
12. "Certain People I Know" – 3:11
13. "Now My Heart Is Full" – 4:08
14. "I Know It's Gonna Happen Someday" – 4:22
15. "Sunny" – 2:41
16. "Alma Matters" – 4:48
17. "Hold on to Your Friends" – 4:04
18. "Sister I'm a Poet" – 2:25
19. "Disappointed" – 3:05
20. "Tomorrow" (radio remix) – 3:54
21. "Lost" – 3:54
