= Suedehead: The Best of Morrissey =

Greatest hits album by Morrissey
- Released: 8 September 1997
- Recorded: 1987–1994
- Genre: Alternative rock
- Length: 71:52
- Label: Parlophone

Morrissey chronology
| Maladjusted (1997) | Suedehead: The Best of Morrissey (1997) | My Early Burglary Years (1998) |

Professional ratings
Review scores
| Source | Rating |
|---|---|
| AllMusic | 4.5/5 stars |
| Blender | link |
| NME | 8/10 |
| Uncut | 3/5 stars |

Suedehead: The Best of Morrissey is a compilation album by English singer Morrissey, released on 8 September 1997. It contains material released during Morrissey's EMI period.

== Content ==
The album's material ranges from 1988's Viva Hate to his 1994's Vauxhall and I album, also containing his 1995 non-album singles "Boxers" and "Sunny". Although Suedehead predominantly contains singles, it also has several rarities including "Pregnant for the Last Time", a cover of "That's Entertainment" originally by The Jam and the complete version of "Interlude", a duet with Siouxsie of Siouxsie and the Banshees. It has since been deleted from the EMI catalogue as of 14 December 2010 alongside Beethoven Was Deaf and World of Morrissey.

== Track listing ==
1. "Suedehead" – 3:56
2. "Sunny" – 2:44
3. "Boxers" – 3:30
4. "Tomorrow" (album version) – 4:04
5. "Interlude" (featuring Siouxsie) – 5:48
6. "Everyday Is Like Sunday" – 3:34
7. "That's Entertainment" (The Jam cover) – 3:57
8. "Hold On to Your Friends" – 4:03
9. "My Love Life" – 4:26
10. "Interesting Drug" – 3:27
11. "Our Frank" – 3:26
12. "Piccadilly Palare" – 3:25
13. "Ouija Board, Ouija Board" – 4:25
14. "You're the One for Me, Fatty" – 3:00
15. "We Hate It When Our Friends Become Successful" – 2:30
16. "The Last of the Famous International Playboys" – 3:39
17. "Pregnant for the Last Time" – 2:41
18. "November Spawned a Monster" – 5:25
19. "The More You Ignore Me, the Closer I Get" – 3:43

== Charts ==
Chart performance for Suedehead: The Best of Morrissey
| Chart (1997) | Peak position |
|---|---|
| UK Albums Chart | 25 |

== Certifications ==
Certifications for Suedehead: The Best of Morrissey
| Region | Certification | Certified units/sales |
|---|---|---|
| United Kingdom (BPI) | Gold | 100,000^{^} |
^{^} Shipments figures based on certification alone.
