= The Malady Lingers On =

Video by Morrissey
- Released: 1992
- Genre: Alternative rock
- Length: 28:23
- Label: EMI

Morrissey chronology
Live in Dallas (1992)	The Malady Lingers On (1992)	Introducing Morrissey (1996)

The Malady Lingers On is a collection of eight videos by the English singer Morrissey released in late 1992. It includes all the promos shot between 1988 and 1992, bar Our Frank's.

The title of this compilation is taken from a sentence in the Marshall McLuhan and Quentin Fiore collido-scope The Medium is the Massage. It was initially released on VHS in 1992 and was rereleased on DVD in 2004.

It was rated 3 out of 5 stars by the Los Angeles Times.

== Track listing ==
1. "Glamorous Glue"
2. "Certain People I Know"
3. "Tomorrow"
4. "We Hate It When Our Friends Become Successful"
5. "My Love Life"
6. "You're the One for Me, Fatty"
7. "Sing Your Life"
8. "Pregnant for the Last Time"
