= The CD Singles '88–91' =

Box set by Morrissey
- Released: 19 June 2000
- Recorded: 1987–1991
- Label: EMI
- Producers: Stephen Street; Clive Langer; Alan Winstanley

Morrissey chronology
My Early Burglary Years (1998)	The CD Singles '88–91' (2000)	The Best of Morrissey (2001)

Professional ratings
Review scores
Source	Rating
AllMusic	4/5 stars

The CD Singles '88–91' is a box set of Morrissey's first ten singles as a solo artist, from "Suedehead" (1988) to "Pregnant for the Last Time" (1991).

== Contents ==
Although each disc contains the three or four songs from the original Compact Disc edition, they are housed in a cardboard sleeve (instead of a jewel case) and replicate the 12-inch artwork, with the titles of songs that were exclusive to CD written on afterwards.

Several of the A and B-sides on these singles appeared on the compilations Bona Drag (1990) and My Early Burglary Years (1998), while others were made available again for the first time since their first release, including "I Know Very Well How I Got My Name", "East West", and the full version of "Will Never Marry".

A number of cover versions also appear: "East West" by Herman's Hermits, The Jam's "That's Entertainment"; T. Rex's "Cosmic Dancer"; Bradford's "Skin Storm"; and a version of "Sweet and Tender Hooligan" by Morrissey's former band The Smiths.

== Packaging ==
The ten discs are housed in a flip-top box. The cover image is from a photograph by Anton Corbijn. It first appeared in the CD booklet for Morrissey's debut solo studio album Viva Hate (1988).

== Critical reception ==
In a 4/10 review, the NME described the set thus:

There's an air of tragedy about this box set, of a rare talent pissed away and a limited, increasingly embittered range of expression. It's a long decline that has now reached the point where labels keep recycling his back catalogue rather than release new songs. An antique curio, a relic from an England that's slowly, mercifully, dying - and that, ironically, he now chooses to keep far away from.

Writing for AllMusic, Stephen Thomas Erlewine was more enthusiastic:

...the main reason to purchase this, of course, are items like the covers of the Jam's "That's Entertainment" and T. Rex's "Cosmic Dancer," which are the kind of B-sides that never make B-side compilations and are worth tracking down for any hardcore fan. It's nice that this box makes the search a little easier.

In September 2000 the set was followed up by The CD Singles '91-95'.

== Track listing ==
=== CD 1 ===
1. "Suedehead"
2. "I Know Very Well How I Got My Name"
3. "Hairdresser on Fire"
4. "Oh Well, I'll Never Learn"

=== CD 2 ===
1. "Everyday Is Like Sunday"
2. "Sister I'm a Poet"
3. "Disappointed"
4. "Will Never Marry"

=== CD 3 ===
1. "The Last of the Famous International Playboys"
2. "Lucky Lisp"
3. "Michael's Bones"

=== CD 4 ===
1. "Interesting Drug"
2. "Such a Little Thing Makes Such a Big Difference"
3. "Sweet and Tender Hooligan" (live)

=== CD 5 ===
1. "Ouija Board, Ouija Board"
2. "Yes I Am Blind"
3. "East West"

=== CD 6 ===
1. "November Spawned a Monster"
2. "He Knows I'd Love to See Him"
3. "Girl Least Likely To"

=== CD 7 ===
1. "Piccadilly Palare"
2. "Get Off the Stage"
3. "At Amber"

=== CD 8 ===
1. "Our Frank"
2. "Journalists Who Lie"
3. "Tony the Pony"

=== CD 9 ===
1. "Sing Your Life"
2. "That's Entertainment"
3. "The Loop"

=== CD 10 ===
1. "Pregnant for the Last Time"
2. "Skin Storm"
3. "Cosmic Dancer" (live)
4. "Disappointed" (live)

There is also a 7" vinyl version of this box set as well as one for The CD Singles '91–95'.
