= Beethoven Was Deaf =

Live album by Morrissey
- Released: 10 May 1993
- Recorded: 20 December 1992, London; 22 December 1992, Paris
- Genre: Alternative rock
- Length: 61:05
- Label: EMI Records/His Master's Voice

Morrissey chronology
Your Arsenal (1992)	Beethoven Was Deaf (1993)	Vauxhall and I (1994)

Professional ratings
Review scores
Source	Rating
AllMusic	link

Beethoven Was Deaf is a live album by Morrissey, recorded around the time of the tour for Your Arsenal. It was the final release from His Master's Voice.

"You're the One for Me, Fatty", "Certain People I Know", "The National Front Disco", "We'll Let You Know", "He Knows I'd Love to See Him", "You're Gonna Need Someone on Your Side" and "Glamorous Glue" were recorded live at the Astoria in London on 20 December 1992, while "November Spawned a Monster", "Seasick, Yet Still Docked", "The Loop", "Sister I'm a Poet", "Jack the Ripper", "Such a Little Thing Makes Such a Big Difference", "I Know it's Gonna Happen Someday", "Suedehead" and "We Hate It When Our Friends Become Successful" were recorded live at Zénith Paris on 22 December.

The sleeve notes incorrectly state that all songs are from the Paris concert. On 14 December 2010, it was announced that EMI had deleted this album along with World of Morrissey and Suedehead: The Best of Morrissey from its catalogue. Despite this, it is still available on streaming platforms.

Every song from Your Arsenal was included with the exception of "Tomorrow".

== Track listing ==
1. "You're the One for Me, Fatty" – 3:59
2. "Certain People I Know" – 2:57
3. "The National Front Disco" – 6:05
4. "November Spawned a Monster" – 5:29
5. "Seasick, Yet Still Docked" – 5:15
6. "The Loop" – 6:00
7. "Sister I'm a Poet" – 2:22
8. "Jack the Ripper" – 4:13
9. "Such a Little Thing Makes Such a Big Difference" – 1:52
10. "I Know It's Gonna Happen Someday" – 3:39
11. "We'll Let You Know" – 5:12
12. "Suedehead" – 4:05
13. "He Knows I'd Love to See Him" – 3:38
14. "You're Gonna Need Someone on Your Side" – 3:35
15. "Glamorous Glue" – 4:05
16. "We Hate It When Our Friends Become Successful" – 2:49

== Band ==
- Morrissey – vocals, maracas, tambourine
- Alain Whyte – guitars, backing vocals
- Boz Boorer – guitars
- Gary Day – bass guitar, double bass
- Spencer Cobrin – drums
