= Introducing Morrissey =

Video by Morrissey
- Released: 1996
- Genre: Alternative rock
- Length: 62 minutes
- Label: Warner Reprise Video
- Director: James O'Brien
- Producer: Joely Fether

Morrissey chronology
The Malady Lingers On (1992)	Introducing Morrissey (1996)	¡Oye Esteban! (2000)

Introducing Morrissey is a video release by Morrissey. The video presents his 1995 British concert tour. It had been available on VHS. On 6 June 2014, it was announced that a DVD version would be released in September 2014.

== Track listing ==
1. "Billy Budd"
2. "Have-a-Go Merchant"
3. "Spring-Heeled Jim"
4. "You're the One for Me, Fatty"
5. "The More You Ignore Me, the Closer I Get"
6. "Whatever Happens, I Love You"
7. "We'll Let You Know"
8. "Jack the Ripper"
9. "Why Don't You Find Out for Yourself"
10. "The National Front Disco"
11. "Moon River"
12. "Hold on to Your Friends"
13. "Boxers"
14. "Now My Heart Is Full"
15. "Speedway"
