= Gary Day (musician) =

British musician

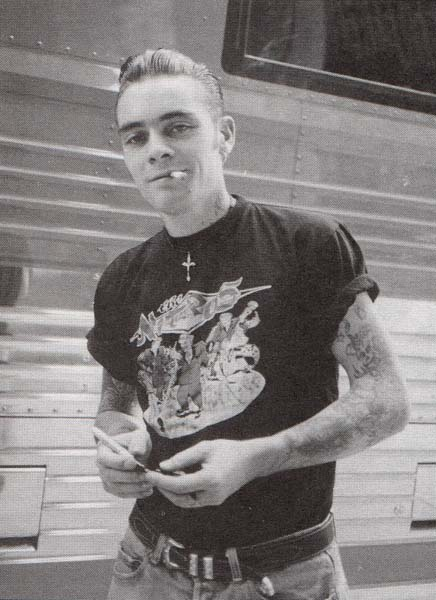

Background information
- Born: Gary Edward William Day; 27 June 1965 (age 61); Neasden, London, England
- Genres: jazz, latin, rockabilly, electronica, rhythm 'n' blues and rock 'n' roll
- Occupation: Bassist
- Instruments: Bass guitar and Double Bass
- Years active: 1985–present
- Label: Various

Gary Edward William Day (born 27 June 1965) is a British musician who played bass for Morrissey, The Nitros, Carlos and the Bandidos, The Poncés and Dante's Eyes.

== Music career ==
Day originally played for Morrissey from 1990, and after rehearsals played through 1991 on the Kill Uncle tour, recording sessions followed for singles and the 1992 album Your Arsenal, and the tour promotion through 1992, but was fired in 1994. He was then re-hired in 1999 for Morrissey's ¡Oye Esteban! tour, and the "You Are Quarry" album singles and tour. He remained the band's bassist until he parted ways at the end of the Ringleader Of The Tormentors album and tour in 2006, to spend time with his family and to work on his material. Day did not participate in any of Morrissey's recording sessions in 2007. He also composed music for Morrissey, including early session material, including "Pashernate Love", "Let The Right One Slip In" and "Mexico".

The Memphis Sinners became the Morrissey backing band, consisting of Spencer Cobrin, Alain Whyte, and Gary Day.

Throughout his career, Day has played either double or electric bass with several bands, including The Caravans, Frantic Flintstones, Colbert Hamilton, The Nitros, The Sharks, The Poncés, The Memphis Sinners and currently for Dante's Eyes.

Day played a one-off concert with The New York Dolls but could not play more due to prior commitments.

Day's own group The Gazmen, which he's vocalist too, (which featured fellow Morrissey guitarist Alain Whyte, with Alan Wilson and Paul Hodges, both members of The Sharks) released a four-track EP titled Rigormortis Rock in September 2000, which was a re-release of the group's 1995 12 inch vinyl EP (on the Vinyl Japan label) also called Rigomortis Rock, and re-released again in 2020.

Aside from working on his music projects, Day is also a frequent DJ.

In late 2012, Day joined the alternative country band the Ely Plains. He left the band in October of the next year.

Day joined Clive Franklin's London based band The Poncés in 2015, and has played for Dante's Eyes since 2021 after The Poncés disbanded in 2020.

Day played on a session for Denvir Jet, a cover of Gene Vincent's "Cat Man the flip to a Denvir" Jet single, being the second 45 rpm release from one of Franklin's recording sessions on Prince Records Inc.

Day is the double bass player for Carlos and the Bandidos as well as composing and producing the single "Beautiful Suicide" released on Migraine records but left the band in 2020.

Day and has played on The Sons' The Tension Of Dream Clouds, which was released in May 2015. He's played double bass alongside drummer Spike T Smith, also an ex-Morrissey band member in Reza Uhdin's band Black Volition on occasion.

Day continues to play bass in many genres of music and cites his influences of Carol Kaye, Willie Dixon and Charles Mingus amongst others.

== Discography ==
The Frantic Flintstones

- Nightmare on Nervous (1987)

The Sharks

- Recreational Killer (1993)
- Bitch Attack (1994)
- The Very Best of The Sharks (2002)

Colbert Hamilton and The Nitros

- Wild at Heart (1994)

Morrissey

- Your Arsenal (1992)
- Beethoven Was Deaf (1993)
- World of Morrissey (1995)
- Suedehead: The Best of Morrissey (1997)
- My Early Burglary Years (1998)
- The CD Singles '91–95' (2000)
- The Best of Morrissey (2001)
- You Are the Quarry (2004)
- Live at Earls Court (2005)
- Ringleader of the Tormentors (2006)
- Greatest Hits (2009)

Denvir Jet and The Soho Ponces

- "Flash Of Inspiration" b/w "Cat Man" (2015), vinyl single

Prince Monolulu and The Soho Ponces

- "Eee Ooo Prince Monolulu" b/w "Misirlou" (2015), vinyl single
- "Caravan" b/w "Caravan" (2016), vinyl single

The Poncés

- "Slaughter of Soho" b/w "Beautiful Songs That Tell You Terrible Things" (2015), vinyl single
- "London Belongs to Me" b/w "The Sediment of Love" (2016), vinyl single
- "Midnight Black" b/w "Nightmares of You" (2016), vinyl single
- "Songs for Hope About Despair" (2016), 12" vinyl album/CD and gatefold reissue (2020)
- "Instant Gratification" b/w "Cosmic Dancer" (2017), vinyl single
- "Rock 'n' Roll Chameleon" b/w "Rock 'n' Roll Suicide" "Lurid City" EP (2018), download and single
- "Fake News" (2021), Video single
- "Singled Out and Left to Wallow (2021), compilation album on download

Dante's Eyes

- "Passionate Fire" (2023) Promo video
- "The Human Jungle" b/w "5 Minutes Past Midnight" (2022), Promo video, download and single
- "La Siesta Sanitarium" b-w "How Much Does It Cost If It's Free" (2023), Promo video, download and single
- "Instant Gratification" Video promo single 2023
- "Cuentos De Lo Inesperado", 12" vinyl album and download released in 2023

Carlos and the Bandidos

- "Beautiful Suicide" (2019), single
