= Who Put the M in Manchester? =

Video by Morrissey
- Released: 2005
- Genre: Alternative rock
- Length: 98:49 minutes
- Label: Sanctuary Records
- Director: Bucky Fukumoto
- Producer: Emer Patten, Sara Seiferheld

Morrissey chronology
| !Oye Esteban! (2000) | Who Put the M in Manchester? (2005) | Live at the Hollywood Bowl (2009) |

Who Put the M in Manchester? is a DVD documenting a live performance by Morrissey. The homecoming concert took place at the Manchester Arena in Manchester, England, on 22 May 2004, Morrissey's 45th birthday. The DVD was certified Gold by the BPI on 22 July 2013.

== Track listing ==
1. "First of the Gang to Die"
2. "Hairdresser on Fire"
3. "Irish Blood, English Heart"
4. "The Headmaster Ritual"
5. "Subway Train" (New York Dolls cover)/"Everyday Is Like Sunday"
6. "I Have Forgiven Jesus"
7. "I Know It's Gonna Happen Someday"
8. "How Can Anybody Possibly Know How I Feel?"
9. "Rubber Ring"
10. "Such a Little Thing Makes Such a Big Difference"
11. "Don't Make Fun of Daddy's Voice"
12. "The World Is Full of Crashing Bores"
13. "Let Me Kiss You"
14. "No One Can Hold a Candle to You" (Raymonde cover)
15. "Jack the Ripper"
16. "A Rush and a Push and the Land Is Ours"
17. "I'm Not Sorry"
18. "Shoplifters of the World Unite"
19. "There Is a Light That Never Goes Out"

=== Personnel ===
- Morrissey — vocals
- Alain Whyte - guitar, vocals
- Boz Boorer — clarinet, conga, guitar, vocals
- Gary Day — bass
- Dean Butterworth — drums
- Michael Farrell - keyboards, trumpet

== DVD extras ==
Five live performances from Move Festival, Manchester 2004:

1. "First of the Gang to Die"
2. "I Have Forgiven Jesus"
3. "Everyday Is like Sunday"
4. "There Is a Light That Never Goes Out"
5. "Irish Blood, English Heart"

Music videos:

1. "Irish Blood, English Heart"
2. "First of the Gang to Die" (UK version)
3. "First of the Gang to Die" (US version)
4. "I Have Forgiven Jesus"
