= World of Morrissey =

Compilation album by Morrissey
- Released: 6 March 1995
- Recorded: 1989–1994
- Genre: Alternative rock
- Length: 54:54
- Label: Parlophone
- Producer: Various (compilation album)

Morrissey chronology
Vauxhall and I (1994)	World of Morrissey (1995)	Southpaw Grammar (1995)

Professional ratings
Review scores
Source	Rating
AllMusic	2.5/5 stars
Rolling Stone	3.5/5 stars

World of Morrissey is a compilation album released in 1995 by Morrissey. It was one of three Morrissey releases EMI deleted from its catalogue on 14 December 2010 along with Beethoven Was Deaf and Suedehead: The Best of Morrissey. The album's cover art features boxer Cornelius Carr.

== Track listing ==
All tracks written by Morrissey and Alain Whyte except where noted.

No.	Title	Writer(s)	Original release	Length
1.	"Whatever Happens, I Love You"		B-side of "Boxers"	3:07
2.	"Billy Budd"		Vauxhall and I	2:09
3.	"Jack the Ripper (Live in Paris, 22 December 1992)"	Morrissey, Boz Boorer	Beethoven Was Deaf	4:10
4.	"Have-a-Go Merchant"		B-side of "Boxers"	2:41
5.	"The Loop"	Morrissey, Mark Nevin	B-side of "Sing Your Life"	4:16
6.	"Sister I'm a Poet" (live in Paris, 22 December 1992)	Morrissey Stephen Street	Beethoven Was Deaf	2:15
7.	"You're the One for Me, Fatty" (live in Paris, 22 December 1992)		Beethoven Was Deaf	3:00
8.	"Boxers"		Single A-side	3:28
9.	"Moon River"	Henry Mancini, Johnny Mercer	B-side of "Hold on to Your Friends"	9:39
10.	"My Love Life" (UK version)	Morrissey, Mark Nevin	Single A-side	4:24
11.	"Certain People I Know"		Your Arsenal	3:10
12.	"The Last of the Famous International Playboys"	Morrissey, Stephen Street	Bona Drag	3:36
13.	"We'll Let You Know"		Your Arsenal	5:16
14.	"Spring-Heeled Jim"	Morrissey, Boz Boorer	Vauxhall and I	3:45
