= Sister I'm a Poet =

Single by Morrissey
- A-side: "Everyday Is Like Sunday"
- Released: 30 May 1988
- Genre: Alternative rock
- Length: 2:44
- Label: His Master's Voice (UK); Sire, Reprise (US)
- Songwriters: Morrissey; Stephen Street
- Producer: Stephen Street

Morrissey singles chronology
"Suedehead" (1988)	"Everyday Is Like Sunday" / "Sister I'm a Poet" (1988)	"The Last of the Famous International Playboys" (1989)

"Sister I'm a Poet" is a song by Morrissey, first released as a B-side to "Everyday Is Like Sunday". The lyric and title have been interpreted as a homage to Tennessee Williams' The Glass Menagerie.

Since its release, the song has seen critical acclaim for its Smiths-style music and Morrissey's witty lyricism. It has since become a fan favourite, appearing on multiple compilation albums and becoming a mainstay of Morrissey's live setlist.

== Background ==
"Sister I'm a Poet" was written by Morrissey and collaborator Stephen Street, with whom he had co-written multiple singles and the album Viva Hate. According to Street, Morrissey decided to write with Street again after Viva Hate became a critical success. The song was part of a trio of songs―the other two being "Will Never Marry" and "Disappointed"—written as B-sides for the "Everyday Is Like Sunday" single. Street commented:

"[When] he got back in touch and we started writing again, I was really getting into gear, I mean if you look at the songs that were recorded for the B-side to 'Everyday Is Like Sunday', songs like 'Sister I'm a Poet', 'Will Never Marry', 'Disappointed', they're really fine songs. So I was thinking 'Right, we're really finding our feet now', but around then I realised that you can never really relax with Morrissey and you never know where you stand and that was that."

The B-side tracks were considered more muscular and Smiths-esque than Viva Hate; though Morrissey claimed this was not intentional, he called the songs "a progression from Viva Hate" and "quite magical". Morrissey also noted that, for the B-sides, he returned to writing lyrics on a typewriter like he did for Smiths songs:

They were the first three songs that I actually set down and pandered across. Which is probably quite awful to admit, but I had reached the stage where I no longer wanted to be intense. I wanted it to be straight forward and almost, in another way, I wanted everything else to take over. But that didn't really happen in the way people viewed the record. So many people who bought Viva Hate and bought Smiths records actually lived with the lyric sheet for days before they would play the record. So I think that's a unique position, but it's one that momentarily began to suffocate me slightly.

== Release ==
"Sister I'm a Poet" was first released on the "Everyday Is Like Sunday" single in May 1988. It has since appeared on compilation albums World of Morrissey, The CD Singles '88–91', The Best of Morrissey, and in the promotional film release Hulmerist. The song has since also become a live favorite, being performed at Morrissey's infamous debut solo concert at Wolverhampton's Civic Hall in December 1988 and being performed with a rockabilly arrangement on later tours. A live version of the song appears on the live album Beethoven Was Deaf.

== Critical reception ==
"Sister I'm a Poet" has seen critical acclaim since its release. Shaun Phillips of Sounds wrote that the song, alongside "Will Never Marry" and "Disappointed", "indicate[s] a turning point in his new career, a return to eloquence, satire, contempt and wit, Morrissey's trade marks before he forsook them for the elegant tranquility of Viva Hate," while also noting "a change in Street's music" which makes all three songs "much rounder and dare to employ devices one might associate with Johnny Marr."

Consequence rated "Sister I'm a Poet" as Morrissey's fourth best solo song, commenting, "Mozzer bounces through his Smithsiest solo track, poking fun at his bookish nature ("With no reason to talk about the books I read, but still I do") and strange fascination with gang culture ("I love the romance of crime"), while reflecting on the rough-and-tumble, blue-collar city he came from. The whole thing would almost seem vain if the lyrics weren't so damn clever." The Chicago Tribune ranked the song as Morrissey's eighth best solo track, praising it for sounding like the Smiths.

== Legacy ==
"Sister I'm a Poet" was used as both opening and closing song in the DVD recording of Russell Brand's "Doing Life" Tour. The song is referenced in My Chemical Romance's 2004 song "Thank You for the Venom", in the opening line "Sister I'm not much a poet/but a criminal".

Brandon Flowers of The Killers has also cited the song as an influence on his songwriting, while also describing himself as being "on speaking terms" with Morrissey. He explained, "He has a thing about death. 'Jenny Was a Friend of Mine' and 'Midnight Show', both from Hot Fuss, were about the murder of a girl. He traces this interest back to Morrissey singing about how he loved 'the romance of crime' in the song 'Sister, I'm a Poet'. 'I studied that line a lot. And it's kind of embedded in me."

=== Cover versions ===
"Sister I'm a Poet" was also covered by Colin Meloy of The Decemberists on the album Colin Meloy Sings Morrissey. Singer songwriter Christy Darlington covered the song live on a Dallas-area radio program called The Adventure Club.
