= Red Lightning =

Red Lightning may refer to:

- Red Lightning (band), an American rock band
- Red Lightning (video game), a 1989 video game
- Sprite (lightning), also known as a "red lightning", an electric discharge above a cumulonimbus
- VF-194, nicknamed the "Red Lightnings", a fighter squadron of the United States Navy
- Angel Guts: Red Lightning, a 1994 Japanese film and the sixth installment in the Angel Guts film series
- Red Lightning, a 2006 novel by John Varley
