= Alain Whyte =

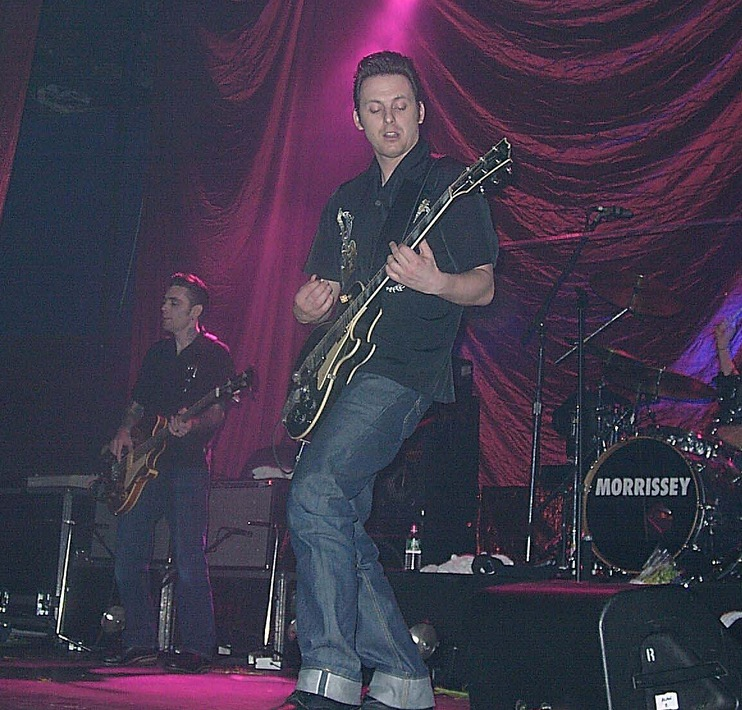
- Whyte in 2000

Background information
- Born: Alain Gordon Whyte; 3 July 1967 (age 59); Camden, London, England
- Genres: Rockabilly; pop; rock and roll
- Occupations: Musician; songwriter; composer; singer
- Instruments: Guitar; piano; vocals
- Years active: 1991–present
- Labels: EMI; His Master's Voice; Sire; RCA; Mercury; Sanctuary
- Formerly of: Morrissey; Johnny Panic; Red Lightning; Tiger Army; Setting Fires
- Website: Myspace.com/AlainWhytemusic

Alain Gordon Whyte (pronounced Alan) (born 3 July 1967) is an English musician, songwriter, composer and singer. He was Morrissey's main songwriting partner and guitarist between 1991 and 2007.

Prior to 1991, Whyte previously been in the bands Rugcutters, Red Lightning, Motivators, Born Bad and the Memphis Sinners. More recently, he has written for Madonna, Chris Brown, and the Black Eyed Peas, and others. He won an American Society of Composers, Authors and Publishers (ASCAP) pop award in 2013 for his work as a songwriter on Brown's hit single "Don't Wake Me Up". The Alain Whyte Band undertook a tour of Southern California in 2026.

== Morrissey ==
Whyte joined Morrissey's band in 1991 after appearing in the music video for his single "Sing Your Life". While playing on the Kill Uncle tour in 1991, Whyte co-wrote eight of the ten songs on the album Your Arsenal which was released in 1992. Whyte played lead guitar live with Morrissey from 1991 to 2004 until he was taken ill and replaced by Jesse Tobias. Whyte never returned to the touring act, but he continued to play on Morrissey studio recordings until 2007, and compose music for Morrissey songs until 2009. Several Morrissey–Whyte compositions were released as late as 2009 after Whyte had left Morrissey's band. It was announced in 2021 that Whyte was working with Morrissey again. Whyte was part of Morrissey's band performing at the Colosseum at Caesars Palace from August 2021 to September 2021. Whyte performed alongside Morrissey throughout 2022 and continued to tour with him into 2023.

Whyte has co-written and/or performed on all of Morrissey's albums issued between 1992 and 2009: Your Arsenal (1992), Vauxhall and I (1994), Southpaw Grammar (1995), Maladjusted (1997), You Are the Quarry (2004), Ringleader of the Tormentors (2006), and Years of Refusal (2009).

Whyte returned to co-write and appear on Make-Up Is a Lie (2026). As of Make-Up Is a Lie, Alain Whyte has a total of 86 known songwriting credits with Morrissey.

== Personal life ==
Whyte resides in Los Angeles, California. His name is pronounced in the English style, i.e. as if it were "Alan White".

== Albums ==
=== Morrissey ===
- Your Arsenal (1992)
- Vauxhall and I (1994)
- Southpaw Grammar (1995)
- Maladjusted (1997)
- You Are the Quarry (2004)
- Ringleader of the Tormentors (2006)
- Years of Refusal (2009)
- Make-Up Is a Lie (2026)

=== Red Lightning ===
- L.A. Crash Landing (2005)

=== Johnny Panic and the Bible of Dreams ===
- Not Bitter But Bored (2006)

=== Solo ===
- Live at The Hotel Café (2019)
- Baby I’m Strange (2025)
- B Sides Baby (2025)
- Bruisers (2026)

== Singles ==
=== Morrissey ===
- "Sing Your Life" (1991) UK No. 33
- "Pregnant for the Last Time" (1991) UK No. 25
- "My Love Life" (1991) UK No. 29
- "We Hate It When Our Friends Become Successful" (1992) UK No. 17 †
- "You're the One for Me, Fatty" (1992) UK No. 19 †
- "Tomorrow" (1992) †
- "Certain People I Know" (1992) UK No. 35 †
- "The More You Ignore Me, the Closer I Get" (1994) UK No. 8
- "Interlude" (with Siouxsie Sioux) [1994] UK No. 25
- "Hold On to Your Friends" (1994) UK No. 48 †
- "Now My Heart Is Full" (1994)
- "Boxers" (1995) UK No. 23 †
- "Dagenham Dave" (1995) UK No. 26 †
- "The Boy Racer" (1995) UK No. 36 †
- "Sunny" (1995) UK No. 42 †
- "Alma Matters" (1997) UK No. 16 †
- "Roy's Keen" (1997) UK No. 42 †
- "Satan Rejected My Soul" (1997) UK No. 39
- "Irish Blood, English Heart" (2004) UK No. 3 †
- "First of the Gang to Die" (2004) UK No. 6 †
- "Let Me Kiss You" (2004) UK No. 8 †
- "I Have Forgiven Jesus" (2004) UK No. 10 †
- "There Is a Light That Never Goes Out" / "Redondo Beach" (2005) UK No. 11
- "You Have Killed Me" (2006) UK No. 3
- "The Youngest Was the Most Loved" (2006) UK No. 14
- "In the Future When All's Well" (2006) UK No. 17
- "I Just Want to See the Boy Happy" (2006) UK No. 16
- "That's How People Grow Up" (2008) UK No. 14
- "All You Need Is Me" (2008) UK No. 24
- "I'm Throwing My Arms Around Paris" (2009) UK No. 21
- "Something Is Squeezing My Skull" (2009) UK No. 46 †
- "Everyday Is Like Sunday" (reissue) [2010] UK No. 42
- "Glamorous Glue" (2011) UK No. 69 †
- "Suedehead" (Mael Mix) [2012]
- "Satellite of Love" (live) [2013]
- "Honey, You Know Where to Find Me" (2020)
- "Notre-Dame" (2026) †
- "The Monsters of Pig Alley" (2026) †
- "Deluxe Notre-Dame" EP (2026) †
- "Happy New Tears" (2026) †
- "Kerching Kerching" (2026)
- "Zoom Zoom the Little Boy" (2026)

† Written by Whyte

=== Johnny Panic and the Bible of Dreams ===
- "When I Drink I Love You More" (1998)

=== Solo ===
- "The Experiment" EP (2018)
- "A Higher Power" EP (2019)
- "Walking Through The Graveyard" Johnny & The Crypt Kickers (2019)
- "Whyte Christmas" EP (2020)
- "Tell Me" EP (2022)
- "Nothing Lasts Forever" (2022)
- "Baby I'm Strange" (2025)
- "Run" (2025)
- "Social Media" (2025)
- "Stuck" (2025)
- "Live for Tomorrow" (2025)
- "If I Could Stop The World" (2025)
