= Bradford (band) =

Indie band from Blackburn, Lancashire

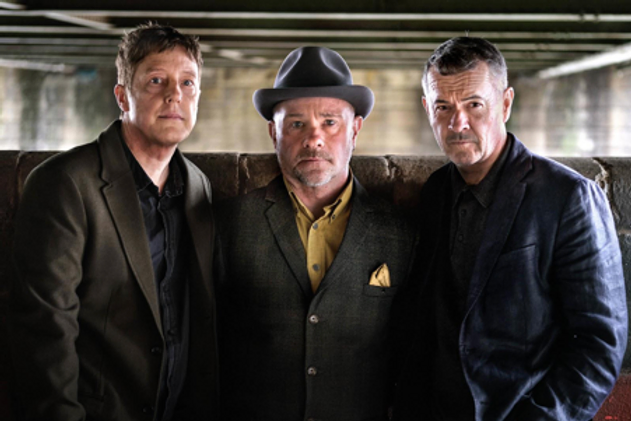

Background information
- Origin: Blackburn, Lancashire, England
- Genre: Indie pop
- Years active: 1987–1991; 2019-present
- Labels: Foundation; Foundation II; Midnight Music; Sire; Warner Bros.; Village
- Members: Ian Hodgson; Ewan Butler; Stephen Street

Bradford are an English indie band originally from Blackburn, Lancashire, England. Current members of the group include vocalist-lyricist Ian Hodgson and musicians Ewan Butler and Stephen Street.

== History ==
The original line-up from 1987 to 1991 was Ian Hodgson (vocals), Ewan Butler (guitar), John Baulcombe (Keyboards), Jos Murphy (bass guitar), and Mark McVittie (drums). The band's debut single, "Skin Storm", was released in 1988 on the Village Records label, and had the distinction of being the first independently financed recording to be released on compact disc. Midnight Music released a self-titled mini-LP for the French market, which was later withdrawn due to copyright issues. The band signed to Smiths producer Stephen Street's Foundation label. Street produced the major share of Bradford's material during their two-year association before the band signed with Sire Records/Warner Bros. Records. The band opened for Morrissey at his first post-Smiths concert at Wolverhampton Civic Hall. 1989 saw two further singles, both hits on the UK Independent Singles Chart, and an album, Shouting Quietly, produced by Stephen Street and released in 1989 on his Foundation Records label in the UK, the Sire Records label in the United States and the Rough Trade Records throughout Europe. The band would part ways with Sire the following year before disbanding in 1991. That same year Morrissey recorded a cover version of "Skin Storm", released as a B-side on his "Pregnant for the Last Time" single and featured on the "My Love Life" US single and The CD Singles '88-91' album. In 2018 A Turn Table Friend records reissued the majority of Bradford's back catalogue along with many previously unheard demo recordings on the album entitled Thirty Years of Shouting Quietly. 2019 saw Butler and Hodson re-unite with former label boss, producer and friend Stephen Street with the latter becoming a permanent member of Bradford. The now three piece went on to release the 2021 album Bright Hours on the Foundation II label.

The band toured extensively during their early years and supported artists including Primal Scream, Joe Strummer, The Sugarcubes and James. In the interim years Hodgson formed the band Acoustic Uprising, and played guitar for On Parole, a tribute to The Clash. Guitarist Ewan Butler wrote and performed with Californian alternative hip-hop artist Ithaka. Bass-player Jos Murphy is currently playing with Morrissey tribute act Viva Morrissey, John Baulcombe was recently the keyboardist with Bolton indie pop band Merchandise, who released their third album, For The Masses, in June 2010. Since August 2011 he has been playing keyboards, guitar and mandolin for Northern-folk-rooted rock band Dave Rowley's Black Country.

On 19 February 2021, the band released new album Bright Hours.

== Discography ==
Chart placings shown are from the UK Indie Chart.

=== Singles ===
- "Skin Storm" b/w "Gatling Gun" (1988), Village
- "Tattered, Tangled & Torn" (1988), Village
- "In Liverpool" b/w Boys Will Be Boys (July 1989) Foundation (#12)
- "Adrift Again" (1989) Foundation (#20)
- "Gang of One" (1990) Foundation

=== Albums ===
- Bradford (1988) Midnight Music (withdrawn)
- Shouting Quietly (August 1989) Foundation/Sire/Rough Trade
- Bright Hours (2021)
