= At KROQ =

EP by Morrissey
- Released: 18 September 1991
- Recorded: 3 June 1991
- Genre: Alternative rock
- Length: 18:47
- Label: Sire Records / Reprise (9 40184-2)

Morrissey chronology
Kill Uncle (1991)	At KROQ (1991)	Your Arsenal (1992)

Professional ratings
Review scores
Source	Rating
Allmusic	3/5 stars

At KROQ is a three-song live EP by Morrissey, released on 18 September 1991. It was recorded at a live session in 1991 for Los Angeles radio station KROQ-FM, while Morrissey was touring in support of his second album Kill Uncle.

Following the end of "Sing Your Life", eight minutes of messages left for Morrissey by fans on the voice mail of KROQ-FM personality Richard Blade are played.

== Track listing ==
1. "There's a Place in Hell for Me and My Friends" – 2:27
2. "My Love Life" – 4:26
3. "Sing Your Life" – 3:40
4. Hidden track – 8:04

All songs written by Mark E. Nevin and Morrissey.

== Liner notes ==
Completely live, straight onto digital 2-track with no overdubs; mixed during performance by Ian Horne. Recorded at Capitol Studios in Hollywood U.S.A. on June 3, 1991.

- Spencer – drums
- Gary Day – bass
- Alain Whyte – guitars
- Boz Boozer – guitars
- Morrissey – vocals
