= Southpaw Grammar =

Studio album by Morrissey
- Released: 28 August 1995
- Recorded: March–April 1995
- Studios: Hook End Manor, Oxfordshire, England
- Genres: Alternative rock; art rock; glam rock
- Length: 47:50
- Label: RCA
- Producer: Steve Lillywhite

Morrissey chronology
World of Morrissey (1995)	Southpaw Grammar (1995)	Maladjusted (1997)

2009 re-release cover

Singles from Southpaw Grammar
- 1. "Dagenham Dave" Released: 21 August 1995; 2. "The Boy Racer" Released: 27 November 1995

Southpaw Grammar is the fifth studio album by English alternative rock singer Morrissey, released on 28 August 1995 by record labels RCA in the UK and Reprise in the US.

The album charted at number 4 in the UK and number 66 in the US. It received a mixed response from critics. The singles lifted from the album were "Dagenham Dave" (which reached number 26 in the UK Singles Chart in August 1995) and "The Boy Racer" (which reached number 36 in December).

== Content ==
The nature of the album is different from past Morrissey releases, such as the inclusion of two tracks which surpass the ten-minute mark, the near two-and-a-half-minute drum solo courtesy of Spencer Cobrin which opens the track "The Operation" and the sampling of a Shostakovich^{1} symphony. AllMusic described it as Morrissey's "art rock album, complete with strings, drum solos and two ten-minute songs." The album cover features a picture of boxer Kenny Lane. Morrissey said the album title refers to the school of hard knocks.

=== Musical style ===
Spin magazine described the album's musical style as "[differing] from the crushed flowers studio formalisations of last year's Vauxhall and I, building instead on the earlier Your Arsenal, Morrissey's sly, unexpected blending of rockabilly and glam."

== Release ==
Southpaw Grammar was released on 28 August 1995 by record labels RCA in the UK and Reprise in the USA. On its release Southpaw Grammar was an eyebrow-raiser for fans and critics alike.

On 27 April 2009 Sony BMG released a remastered version of Southpaw Grammar in the UK. This version included a substantially altered running order, three previously unreleased tracks, "Honey, You Know Where to Find Me", "You Should Have Been Nice to Me" and "Fantastic Bird" (the last of which dates from the Your Arsenal sessions) as well as a single B-side "Nobody Loves Us". The digital version from iTunes Store adds live versions of "London" and "Billy Budd", recorded in London.

== Reception ==
Professional ratings
Review scores
Source	Rating
AllMusic	2.5/5 stars
Blender (2004 review)	2/5 stars
Chicago Tribune	2.5/4 stars
Entertainment Weekly	B
The Guardian	3/5 stars
Los Angeles Times	3/4 stars
Q	4/5 stars
Rolling Stone	3/5 stars
Select	3/5
Spin	8/10

The critical reception to Southpaw Grammar was mostly positive upon release. Richard Cromelin of the Los Angeles Times described it as "the most musically dynamic album from the Messiah of Moans since he revitalized British rock with The Smiths in the mid-'80s". Al Weisel of Rolling Stone qualified it as Morrissey's "most powerful solo outing to date". Q's Phil Sutcliffe wrote that Southpaw Grammar "shapes up as the kind of severe work that accrues more honour than love, more favourable comments than sales to record-buyers", and the magazine later listed it as one of the top 50 albums of 1995. In 1999, critic Ned Raggett ranked the album at number 79 on his list of "The Top 136 or So Albums of the Nineties".

According to an article published in Uncut magazine in 2009: "On its release, Southpaw Grammar seemed to be the point where the Great British Public officially fell out of love with Morrissey. The casual Smiths fan had all but lost interest while even the scary Moz obsessives were a little puzzled." Blender's Tony Power rétrospectively called it an "ugly, noisy, grumpy album, recorded while Britpop stole Moz's thunder and the Mike Joyce court case loomed." Andrzej Lukowski of Drowned in Sound was more favourable in his retrospective assessment, writing that the album "is in some ways the most daring thing the ex-Smith has ever put his name to... [...] At the same time it's also pretty craven, in that it dilutes the impact of its three key tracks – 'The Teachers Are Afraid of the Pupils', 'The Operation' and 'Southpaw', dark, sprawling semi-instrumentals dominated by the remarkable drumming of Spencer James Cobrin – with lightweight fluff like 'Dagenham Dave' and 'The Boy Racer'." Brad Shoup of Stereogum retrospectively named it Morrissey's "peak" and "quintessential document".

== Track listing ==
All tracks written by Morrissey and Alain Whyte except where noted.

No.	Title	Writer(s)	Length
1.	"The Teachers Are Afraid of the Pupils" (features Dmitri Shostakovich's Fifth Symphony sample)	Morrissey, Boz Boorer	11:15
2.	"Reader Meet Author"	Morrissey, Boorer	3:39
3.	"The Boy Racer"		4:46
4.	"The Operation"		6:52
5.	"Dagenham Dave"		3:13
6.	"Do Your Best and Don't Worry"		4:05
7.	"Best Friend on the Payroll"		3:48
8.	"Southpaw"		10:03

2009 Expanded Edition version
No.	Title	Writer(s)	Length
1.	"The Boy Racer"		4:55
2.	"Do Your Best and Don't Worry"		4:05
3.	"Reader Meet Author"	Morrissey, Boorer	3:39
4.	"Honey, You Know Where to Find Me"	Morrissey, Boorer	2:55
5.	"Dagenham Dave"		3:13
6.	"Southpaw"		10:03
7.	"Best Friend on the Payroll"		3:48
8.	"Fantastic Bird"		2:53
9.	"The Operation"		6:52
10.	"The Teachers Are Afraid of the Pupils" (features Dmitri Shostakovich's Fifth Symphony sample)	Morrissey, Boorer	11:15
11.	"You Should Have Been Nice to Me"	Morrissey, Boorer	3:35
12.	"Nobody Loves Us"		4:50

Note: Given the 2009 re-release CD is a mock up of a vinyl record, the words "the heart is a lonely hunter" appear on the runout grooves.

== Personnel ==
- Morrissey – vocals
- Alain Whyte – guitar, backing vocals
- Boz Boorer – guitar
- Jonny Bridgwood – bass guitar
- Spencer James Cobrin – drums

Technical

- Steve Lillywhite – production (except "Fantastic Bird")
- Mick Ronson - production on "Fantastic Bird" (1992)

== Charts ==
1995 chart performance for Southpaw Grammar
Chart (1995)	Peak position
Australian Albums (ARIA)	74
Canada Top Albums/CDs (RPM)	35
Dutch Albums (Album Top 100)	79
Finnish Albums (Suomen virallinen lista)	38
Swedish Albums (Sverigetopplistan)	14
UK Albums (Official Charts)	4
US Billboard 200	66

2009 chart performance for Southpaw Grammar
Chart (2009)	Peak position
French Albums (SNEP)	175
Irish Albums (IRMA)	75

== Certifications ==
Certifications for Southpaw Grammar
Region	Certification	Certified units/sales
United Kingdom (BPI)	Silver	60,000^{^}
^{^} Shipments figures based on certification alone.
