= Red Lightning (band) =

American rock band (2005–2007)

Background information
- Origin: Los Angeles, United States
- Genres: Rock
- Years active: 2005–2007
- Label: n/a
- Past members: Alain Whyte; John DiMambro; Milo Todesco

Red Lightning were a Los Angeles–based rock band composed of English guitarist Alain Whyte (of Morrissey's band) on lead vocals and guitar, John DiMambro on bass guitar and Milo Todesco on drums. The band lists U2, The Clash, The Cult, The Smiths and Morrissey as its influences.

== Background ==
The three band members have a diverse musical background spanning punk to rockabilly to English pop to orchestral.

Alain Whyte was most renowned as a guitarist, supporting vocalist and co-writer in Morrissey. Whyte has a background in rockabilly.

John DiMambro (aka Johnny Anger) is a long-time fan of Morrissey and The Smiths. John grew up in Los Angeles' punk scene. He has recorded on bass with Down by Law, Jack Grisham of T.S.O.L., and the psychobilly band The Rocketz . He performed live with Pearl Harbor, Jane Wiedlin of The Go-Go's, and Agent Orange.

Milo Todesco had recorded and performed live with Down By Law, Armen Chakmakian of Shadowfax, Jim Cherry of Strung Out, Pully, Zero Down, and played timpani with UCLA Choir conductor Roger Wagner.

== Band history ==
Red Lightning played their first official show on April 30, 2005, at the Knitting Factory in Hollywood, California. They recorded a full-length album with producer David Newton (Mighty Lemon Drops, Fonda, The Blood Arm and Blue Aeroplanes) in 2005. Due to irreconcilable differences Red Lightning split in November 2006. The band announced their split via their Myspace page:

== Discography ==
=== EPs ===
LA Crash Landing (November 2005)

1. "Something out of Nothing"
2. "Crushed"
3. L.A. Crash Landing
4. Sign Up
5. I Miss You
6. Black Dog Day
7. Stuck (Acoustic Version)
8. Were you ever in my Life (Acoustic Version)
