= The Boy Racer =

1995 single by Morrissey

Single by Morrissey

from the album Southpaw Grammar
- Released: 27 November 1995
- Length: 4:46
- Label: RCA
- Songwriter(s): Morrissey, Alain Whyte
- Producer(s): Steve Lillywhite

Morrissey singles chronology
"Dagenham Dave" (1995)	"The Boy Racer" (1995)	"Sunny" (1995)

"The Boy Racer" is a song by English singer-songwriter Morrissey, released as the second single from his fifth studio album, Southpaw Grammar (1995), in November 1995. It was Morrissey's second and final single released on RCA Records after leaving EMI Records. The single was released across two CDs, each with different covers but both featuring a young boy. Contrary to rumour, the child is not Morrissey's nephew. The song reached number 36 on the UK Singles Chart.

== Live performances ==
The song was performed live by Morrissey between 1995 and 2011.

== Track listings ==
7-inch: RCA / 74321 33294 7 (UK)

1. "The Boy Racer" – 4:47
2. "London" (live London 26 February 1995) – 2:38

CD: RCA / 74321 33294 2 (UK)

1. "The Boy Racer" – 4:47
2. "London" (live London 26 February 1995) – 2:38
3. "Billy Budd" (live London 26 February 1995) – 2:19

CD: RCA / 74321 33295 2 (UK)

1. "The Boy Racer" – 4:47
2. "Spring-Heeled Jim" (live London 26 February 1995) – 3:50
3. "Why Don't You Find Out for Yourself" (live London 26 February 1995) – 3:51

== Personnel ==
- Morrissey: voice
- Alain Whyte: guitar
- Boz Boorer: guitar
- Jonny Bridgwood: bass guitar
- Spencer Cobrin: drums
