= Dagenham Dave =

1995 single by Morrissey

Single by Morrissey

from the album Southpaw Grammar
- B-side: "Nobody Loves Us"; "You Must Please Remember"
- Released: 21 August 1995
- Length: 3:16
- Label: RCA Victor
- Songwriter(s): Morrissey; Alain Whyte
- Producer(s): Steve Lillywhite

Morrissey singles chronology
"Boxers" (1995)	"Dagenham Dave" (1995)	"The Boy Racer" (1995)

Southpaw Grammar track listing
- 1. "The Teachers Are Afraid of the Pupils"; 2. "Reader Meet Author"; 3. "The Boy Racer"; 4. "The Operation"; 5. "Dagenham Dave"; 6. "Do Your Best and Don't Worry"; 7. "Best Friend on the Payroll"; 8. "Southpaw"

Professional ratings
Review scores
Source	Rating
AllMusic	2/5 stars

"Dagenham Dave" is a song by English singer-songwriter Morrissey, issued as a single in August 1995, a week prior to the release of his fifth studio album, Southpaw Grammar (1995). It was Morrissey's first release on RCA Records, the label he had signed to after leaving EMI. This was the second Morrissey solo single not to feature the singer on the cover; instead, English football coach and former player Terry Venables is pictured sticking out his tongue. Venables was born in Dagenham.

Upon its release, the single reached number 26 on the UK Singles Chart. The promotional video for the single featured former Grange Hill actor Mark Savage as the titular Dave. This song is not related to the track of the same name by the Stranglers from their 1977 album, No More Heroes. "Dagenham Dave" is also naval slang for someone who is somewhat unstable or crazy, Dagenham being close to Barking ("barking mad").

== Critical reception ==
NME gave a negative review, saying that this single showed that "Morrissey has become the embarrassing incontinent grandfather of Britpop". The song was described as "piss-poor old crap" and a "tune-impaired three-minute drone". Ned Raggett of AllMusic described it as "the least distinct song on the whole album". In other reviews, the opinion was that the song was "very good". It was a unique style which Morrissey had embraced during the height of the Britpop era. In his book Mozipedia, Simon Goddard called it "a mettlesome pop cartoon featuring, if nothing else, the greatest utterance of the word 'pie' by any singer in the entire history of recorded music."

== Track listings ==
All tracks were written by Morrissey and Alain Whyte.

7-inch and cassette: RCA / 29980 7; 29980 4 (UK)

1. "Dagenham Dave"
2. "Nobody Loves Us"

CD: RCA / 29980 2 (UK)

1. "Dagenham Dave"
2. "Nobody Loves Us"
3. "You Must Please Remember"

== Musicians ==
- Morrissey: lead vocals
- Alain Whyte: guitar
- Boz Boorer: guitar
- Jonny Bridgwood: bass
- Spencer Cobrin: drums

== See also ==
- Mondeo Man
