= Sunny (Morrissey song) =

1995 single by Morrissey

Single by Morrissey
- B-side: "Black-Eyed Susan"; "A Swallow on My Neck"
- Released: 11 December 1995
- Length: 2:43
- Label: Parlophone
- Songwriter(s): Morrissey, Alain Whyte
- Producer(s): Steve Lillywhite

Morrissey singles chronology
"The Boy Racer" (1995)	"Sunny" (1995)	"Alma Matters" (1997)

"Sunny" is a song by English singer-songwriter Morrissey, released as a single in December 1995. It was released by Parlophone to try to cash in on Morrissey's Southpaw Grammar album that had been released that year by RCA Records and consists of three songs that Morrissey had recorded while under contract to Parlophone. "Sunny" had initially been planned to appear on the "Boxers" single released in January 1995, and "Black-Eyed Susan" had at one point been allocated to be the B-side of "The More You Ignore Me, the Closer I Get" in 1994.

== Reception ==
Jack Rabid of AllMusic described Sunny as "pleasant, breezy, jovial, and winsome, but the melody is not memorable." He expressed a preference for the B-sides: "As has been the case for Morrissey's whole career, the B-sides overshadow the A-side."

== Track listings ==
7-inch (Parlophone R6243)

No.	Title	Length
1.	"Sunny"	2:45
2.	"Black-Eyed Susan"	4:08

Cassette (Parlophone TCR6243)

No.	Title	Length
1.	"Sunny"	2:45
2.	"Black-Eyed Susan"	4:08

CD (Parlophone CDR6243)

No.	Title	Length
1.	"Sunny"	2:45
2.	"Black-Eyed Susan"	4:08
3.	"A Swallow on My Neck"	2:52

== Personnel ==
- Morrissey – voice
- Alain Whyte – guitar
- Boz Boorer – guitar
- Jonny Bridgwood – bass guitar (tracks 1, 2)
- Gary Day - bass guitar (track 3)
- Woodie Taylor – drums (tracks 1, 2)
- Spencer James Cobrin - drums (track 3)
- Paul Spencer - photographer
