= My Love Life =

1991 single by Morrissey

Single by Morrissey
- B-side: "I've Changed My Plea to Guilty"; "There's a Place in Hell for Me and My Friends"; "Skin Storm"
- Released: 30 September 1991
- Length: 4:24
- Label: His Master's Voice
- Songwriters: Morrissey, Mark Nevin
- Producers: Clive Langer, Alan Winstanley

Morrissey singles chronology
"Pregnant for the Last Time" (1991)	"My Love Life" (1991)	"We Hate It When Our Friends Become Successful" (1992)

Professional ratings
Review scores
Source	Rating
AllMusic	3/5 stars

"My Love Life" is a song by Morrissey released in September 1991. It was a stand-alone single rather than taken from any studio album, although it was included on the compilation albums World of Morrissey (1995) and Suedehead: The Best of Morrissey (1997).

Rather than continuing with the rockabilly sound of "Pregnant for the Last Time", Morrissey and songwriting partner Mark Nevin returned to a poppier sound for the final single they would release together. Featuring Chrissie Hynde on harmony vocals, the single reached number 29 in the UK Singles Chart.

This was the last Morrissey release before he joined up with Alain Whyte and Boz Boorer on a full-time basis.

The US and UK versions of "My Love Life" have some slight differences, both in the mix of the title track and especially in the mix of the B-side "I've Changed My Plea to Guilty." Both mixes of "My Love Life" use the same take, but the US version is a full 25 seconds longer at the end, while the UK version starts fading out at 4:08.

The UK version of "I've Changed My Plea to Guilty" runs 3:40 and includes two overlapping samples at the beginning of the track. The first sample is of a male voice apparently telling a story in a restaurant while dishes clink in the background, and a female companion laughs. The second sample is from Skeeter Davis' 1962 recording of "The End of the World" played on a scratchy vinyl record. Both samples return at the end of the track, with the male voice continuing his story and the Skeeter Davis record fading out with audible vinyl surface noise. The US version of "I've Changed My Plea to Guilty" runs 3:11 and omits both samples. The US mix is somewhat brighter and contains the full coda of the song including the decay of the final piano chord.

The UK version of "My Love Life" also appears on the 1997 compilation Suedehead: The Best of Morrissey. The US version of "I've Changed My Plea to Guilty" was later included on the 1998 compilation My Early Burglary Years.

== Critical reception ==
"My Love Life" was reviewed in NME by John Peel as the "best one he's [Morrissey] made in a long time" and the song was described as "catchy, romantic [and] endearing". In a retrospective reception, Ned Raggett of AllMusic called the song "a gentler ramble in comparison to things like the live "Sing Your Life," and though the lyrics are a bit curious (Morrissey asking for a ménage à trois?), the performance is a fine one all around."

== Music video ==
The music video, directed by Tim Broad was shot mostly on Van Buren Street in Phoenix, Arizona. It depicts Morrissey driving in a Rolls-Royce Corniche II along with members of his band who have their hair cut in Morrissey's style.

== Track listings ==
7-inch vinyl and cassette (UK)

1. "My Love Life" (UK version)
2. "I've Changed My Plea to Guilty" (UK version)

12-inch vinyl and CD (UK)

1. "My Love Life" (UK version)
2. "I've Changed My Plea to Guilty" (UK version)
3. "There's a Place in Hell for Me and My Friends" (KROQ)

12-inch vinyl and CD (US)

1. "My Love Life" (US version)
2. "I've Changed My Plea to Guilty" (US version)
3. "Skin Storm" (Bradford cover)

== Personnel ==
- Morrissey: voice
- Mark E. Nevin: guitars
- Mark Bedford: bass
- Andrew Paresi: drums
- Chrissie Hynde: backing vocals

Note: Morrissey's recently recruited live band, Boz Boorer, Alain Whyte, Spencer Cobrin and Gary Day, are erroneously credited on the single sleeve.
