= We Hate It When Our Friends Become Successful =

1992 single by Morrissey

Single by Morrissey

from the album Your Arsenal
- Released: 27 April 1992
- Studio: Utopia (North London)
- Length: 2:29
- Label: His Master's Voice
- Songwriters: Morrissey; Alain Whyte
- Producer: Mick Ronson

Morrissey singles chronology
| "My Love Life" (1991) | "We Hate It When Our Friends Become Successful" (1992) | "You're the One for Me, Fatty" (1992) |

Music video
- "We Hate It When Our Friends Become Successful" on YouTube

"We Hate It When Our Friends Become Successful" is a song by the English singer-songwriter Morrissey from his third studio album, Your Arsenal (1992). It was released as the lead single from the album on 27 April 1992 by His Master's Voice. It was the first Morrissey single to be co-written with guitarist Alain Whyte and produced by glam rock guitarist Mick Ronson, known for his work with David Bowie as one of the Spiders from Mars. The song peaked at No. 17 on the UK Singles Chart and No. 9 in Ireland.

== Background and content ==
Morrissey said that the lyrics were about the music scene in Manchester, with bands contesting for success. James lead singer Tim Booth has claimed the song is about the success James had as a fellow Manchester band, once performing it at a festival in place of Morrissey. Morrissey, however, states that the song is not about James. On hating when his friends became successful, Morrissey said: "When my old friend Simon Topping (the frontman of Manchester band A Certain Ratio) appeared on the cover of the NME, I died a thousand deaths of sorrow and lay down in the woods to die."

== Critical reception ==
Professional ratings
Review scores
| Source | Rating |
|---|---|
| AllMusic | 3/5 stars |

Andrew Collins in NME gave a very negative review of the single, writing that "this is by far and away the ex-Smith's WORST single" and described the music as "the sound of five men bashing around in the darkness in search of a tune" before finishing the review by announcing "Moz is history, and we'd all do well to learn it." In a retrospective review, Ned Raggett of AllMusic wrote "It may be a mouthful, but as delivered it becomes a wonderfully funny, intentionally bitchy sentiment for this EP's lead track."

== Live performances ==
Morrissey debuted the song during the second US leg of his tour promoting the Kill Uncle album. The first half of the song was performed during the aborted gig at Pauley Pavilion in 1991, in which 48 people were injured as the crowd rushed the stage. It then was performed in concert for the duration of his tour in 1992 promoting Your Arsenal. Fellow Manchester band James performed it as a set opener when standing in for Morrissey at Glastonbury, with frontman Tim Booth's stating "this is our Morrissey impression".

== Track listings ==
7-inch vinyl and cassette

1. "We Hate It When Our Friends Become Successful"
2. "Suedehead" (live London 4/10/91)

12-inch vinyl (UK)

1. "We Hate It When Our Friends Become Successful"
2. "Suedehead" (live London 4/10/91)
3. "I've Changed My Plea to Guilty" (live London 4/10/91)
4. "Pregnant for the Last Time" (live London 4/10/91)

CD (UK)

1. "We Hate It When Our Friends Become Successful"
2. "Suedehead" (live London 4/10/91)
3. "I've Changed My Plea to Guilty" (live London 4/10/91)
4. "Alsatian Cousin" (live London 4/10/91)

12-inch vinyl and CD (US)

1. "We Hate It When Our Friends Become Successful"
2. "Suedehead" (live London 4/10/91)
3. "I've Changed My Plea to Guilty" (live London 4/10/91)
4. "Pregnant for the Last Time" (live London 4/10/91)
5. "Alsatian Cousin" (live London 4/10/91)

| Region | Record label | Format | Catalogue number |
|---|---|---|---|
| UK | His Master's Voice | 7-inch vinyl | POP1629 |
| UK | His Master's Voice | 12-inch vinyl | 12POP1629 |
| UK | His Master's Voice | Compact disc | CDPOP1629 |
| UK | His Master's Voice | Cassette | TCPOP1629 |

== Musicians ==
- Morrissey – voice
- Alain Whyte – guitar
- Boz Boorer – guitar
- Gary Day – bass guitar
- Spencer Cobrin – drums

== Charts ==
| Chart (1992) | Peak position |
|---|---|
| Australia (ARIA) | 55 |
| Europe (Eurochart Hot 100) | 63 |
| Ireland (IRMA) | 9 |
| UK Singles (OCC) | 17 |
| US Alternative Airplay (Billboard) | 2 |

== Release history ==
| Region | Date | Format(s) | Label | Ref. |
|---|---|---|---|---|
| United Kingdom | 27 April 1992 | CD | His Master's Voice | |
| Australia | 8 June 1992 | CD; cassette | His Master's Voice | |
