= Vauxhall and I =

Studio album by Morrissey
- Released: 14 March 1994
- Recorded: June–August 1993
- Studios: Hook End Manor, Oxfordshire, England
- Genre: Alternative rock
- Length: 39:53
- Labels: Parlophone (UK); Sire/Reprise (US)
- Producer: Steve Lillywhite

Morrissey chronology
Beethoven Was Deaf (1993)	Vauxhall and I (1994)	World of Morrissey (1995)

Singles from Vauxhall and I
- 1. "The More You Ignore Me, the Closer I Get" Released: 28 February 1994; 2. "Hold On to Your Friends" Released: 30 May 1994; 3. "Now My Heart Is Full" Released: 23 August 1994

Vauxhall and I is the fourth studio album by English alternative rock musician Morrissey. It was released on 14 March 1994, by the record label Parlophone in the UK and Sire/Reprise in the USA.

== Background ==
The album's title may be a reference to the 1987 film Withnail and I. Vauxhall is an area of London noted for its gay clubs, and there is also a British car manufacturer of the same name.

"Spring Heeled Jim" contains bits of dialogue from We Are the Lambeth Boys, a 1959 documentary that follows the lives of members of a south London youth club. The line "Don't leave us in the dark" at the end of "Billy Budd" is sampled from the 1948 David Lean film adaptation of Dickens' Oliver Twist. This was said by one of Fagin's pickpockets to Fagin when the mob was closing in on their hiding place. The song itself shares the title with a novella by Herman Melville.

== Release ==
Vauxhall and I was a success in the United States, making the top 20. It was also Morrissey's second solo album to reach the top of the charts in Britain, the first being Viva Hate.

The lead single off the album, "The More You Ignore Me, the Closer I Get", became the only song by Morrissey or the Smiths to achieve chart success in the United States, where it reached number 46 on the Billboard Hot 100 and number 1 on the Modern Rock Tracks chart. In the United Kingdom, the song hit number 8 on the UK Singles Chart and was the only single by Morrissey to reach the top ten during the 1990s.

== Reception ==
Professional ratings
Review scores
Source	Rating
AllMusic	4.5/5 stars
Blender	5/5 stars
Entertainment Weekly	A−
Los Angeles Times	3/4 stars
NME	8/10
Pitchfork	7.8/10
Q	5/5 stars
Rolling Stone	4/5 stars
The Rolling Stone Album Guide	4/5 stars
Select	5/5

Q listed Vauxhall and I as one of the top ten albums of 1994. In February 2006, the same magazine voted it at number 89 on its list of the best albums ever.

In a three out of four star review, Lorraine Ali of the Los Angeles Times wrote that "Morrissey’s poetic, frank lyrics and cultured, despairing croons seem less inhibited than in his previous solo works."

In a retrospective review from 2014, Jason Heller of Pitchfork wrote that "besides being one of Morrissey’s most vital solo albums, Vauxhall and I is also his first truly mature one, and flaws and all, it’s as essential—and as perversely alive—as ever."

In a list published in 2014, the NME named Vauxhall and I as Morrissey's best solo album.

== Track listing ==
All lyrics are written by Morrissey.

No.	Title	Music	Length
1.	"Now My Heart Is Full"	Boz Boorer	4:57
2.	"Spring-Heeled Jim"	Boorer	3:47
3.	"Billy Budd"	Alain Whyte	2:08
4.	"Hold On to Your Friends"	Whyte	4:02
5.	"The More You Ignore Me, the Closer I Get"	Boorer	3:44
6.	"Why Don't You Find Out for Yourself"	Whyte	3:20
7.	"I Am Hated for Loving"	Whyte	3:41
8.	"Lifeguard Sleeping, Girl Drowning"	Boorer	3:42
9.	"Used to Be a Sweet Boy"	Whyte	2:49
10.	"The Lazy Sunbathers"	Whyte	3:08
11.	"Speedway"	Boorer	4:30

=== Definitive Edition, 20th Anniversary Remaster ===
The 2014 anniversary remaster includes the previously unavailable 1995 concert from Theatre Royal, London.

1. "Billy Budd"
2. "Have-a-Go Merchant"
3. "Spring-Heeled Jim"
4. "London"
5. "You're the One for Me, Fatty"
6. "Boxers"
7. "Jack the Ripper"
8. "We'll Let You Know"
9. "Whatever Happens I Love You"
10. "Why Don't You Find Out for Yourself"
11. "The More You Ignore Me, the Closer I Get"
12. "National Front Disco"
13. "Moon River"
14. "Now My Heart Is Full"

== Personnel ==
Musicians

- Morrissey – vocals & lyrics
- Alain Whyte – guitars & backing vocals
- Boz Boorer – guitars & keyboards
- Jonny Bridgewood – bass
- Woodie Taylor – drums

Technical

- Greg Ross – art direction
- Dean Freeman – photography
- Chris Dickie – producer, engineer
- Steve Lillywhite – producer
- Danton Supple – assistant engineer

== Charts ==
1994 chart performance for Vauxhall and I
Chart (1994)	Peak position
Australian Albums (ARIA)	21
Canada Top Albums/CDs (RPM)	22
Dutch Albums (Album Top 100)	73
New Zealand Albums (RMNZ)	28
Swedish Albums (Sverigetopplistan)	13
UK Albums (Official Charts)	1
US Billboard 200	18

2014 chart performance for Vauxhall and I
Chart (2014)	Peak position
Belgian Albums (Ultratop Flanders)	141
Irish Albums (IRMA)	80

== Certifications ==
Certifications for Vauxhall and I
Region	Certification	Certified units/sales
United Kingdom (BPI)	Gold	100,000^{^}
^{^} Shipments figures based on certification alone.
