= Your Arsenal =

Studio album by Morrissey
- Released: 27 July 1992
- Recorded: February 1992 at Utopia Studios, Primrose Hill; March 1992 at The Wool Hall, Bath, England
- Genres: Glam rock; rockabilly; Britpop
- Length: 39:45
- Label: His Master's Voice
- Producer: Mick Ronson

Morrissey chronology
At KROQ (1991)	Your Arsenal (1992)	Beethoven Was Deaf (1993)

Singles from Your Arsenal
- 1. "We Hate It When Our Friends Become Successful" Released: 27 April 1992; 2. "You're the One for Me, Fatty" Released: 6 July 1992; 3. "Tomorrow" Released: September 1992; 4. "Certain People I Know" Released: 7 December 1992; 5. "Glamorous Glue" Released: 18 April 2011

Your Arsenal is the third studio album by English singer Morrissey, released on 27 July 1992 by record label His Master's Voice.

The album received critical acclaim and reached number 4 on the UK Albums Chart.

== Content ==
Morrissey had been rehearsing with a new band prior to the release of Your Arsenal, which was the first official album of this new line-up.

Commencing with "You're Gonna Need Someone on Your Side", the album represents a clear change in direction for Morrissey from indie pop to a more muscular rock sound; with some elements of rockabilly. It also contains a glam rock influence, due to the involvement of ex-David Bowie guitarist Mick Ronson as producer. "Certain People I Know", "Glamorous Glue" and "I Know It's Gonna Happen Someday", are respectively influenced by T. Rex, and David Bowie's Ziggy Stardust period songs (e.g. "The Jean Genie" and the last by "Rock 'n' Roll Suicide"). Bowie himself later covered the track "I Know It's Gonna Happen Someday" on his 1993 album Black Tie White Noise.

== Release ==
Your Arsenal was released on 27 July 1992 by record label His Master's Voice. It reached number 4 on the UK Albums Chart.

The album earned a Grammy Award nomination for Best Alternative Music Album.

In 2014, Rhino Records issued a "Definitive Master" of the album. This version was remastered and substitutes the original album version of "Tomorrow" for the U.S. single mix. It also includes a bonus DVD of a 1991 concert from Shoreline Amphitheatre in Mountain View, California.

== Critical reception ==
Professional ratings
Review scores
Source	Rating
AllMusic	4.5/5 stars
Blender	4/5 stars
Entertainment Weekly	A−
Los Angeles Times	3/4 stars
NME	7/10
Pitchfork	7.3/10
Q	5/5 stars
Rolling Stone	4/5 stars
The Rolling Stone Album Guide	5/5 stars
The Village Voice	A−

Your Arsenal was praised by critics. Robert Christgau of The Village Voice called it his "most consistent solo set to date". Bill Wyman of Entertainment Weekly wrote that guitarist Alain Whyte "provides the very melodic, sometimes rockabilly-inflected settings Morrissey demands, and frequently they end up triumphant."

Referring to the album as "a dynamic, invigorating fusion of glam rock and rockabilly" and noting that it "rocks harder than any other record Morrissey ever made", Stephen Thomas Erlewine of AllMusic cited Your Arsenal as Morrissey's "finest solo record and his best work since The Queen Is Dead."

Your Arsenal was listed as one of the top 50 albums of 1992 by Q. The album was also included in the book 1001 Albums You Must Hear Before You Die.

== Track listing ==
All lyrics are written by Morrissey; all music is composed by Alain Whyte, except as noted.

No.	Title	Music	Length
1.	"You're Gonna Need Someone on Your Side"	Mark E. Nevin	3:38
2.	"Glamorous Glue"		4:01
3.	"We'll Let You Know"		5:17
4.	"The National Front Disco"		4:23
5.	"Certain People I Know"		3:11
6.	"We Hate It When Our Friends Become Successful"		2:29
7.	"You're the One for Me, Fatty"		2:58
8.	"Seasick, Yet Still Docked"		5:07
9.	"I Know It's Gonna Happen Someday"	Mark E. Nevin	4:20
10.	"Tomorrow"		4:17

== Personnel ==
- Morrissey – vocals
- Alain Whyte – guitars
- Boz Boorer – guitars
- Gary Day – bass guitar
- Spencer Cobrin – drums
- Mick Ronson – production (All except track #9)

=== Additional ===
- Mark Nevin - Production on "I Know It's Gonna Happen Someday"

== Charts ==
1992 chart performance for Your Arsenal
Chart (1992)	Peak position
Australian Albums (ARIA)	12
Canada Top Albums/CDs (RPM)	28
Dutch Albums (Album Top 100)	76
New Zealand Albums (RMNZ)	29
Swedish Albums (Sverigetopplistan)	42
UK Albums (Official Charts)	4
US Billboard 200	21

2014 chart performance for Your Arsenal
Chart (2014)	Peak position
Hungarian Albums (MAHASZ)	18
Irish Albums (IRMA)	77
UK Albums (Official Charts)	49

== Certifications and sales ==
Certifications and sales for Your Arsenal
Region	Certification	Certified units/sales
United States	—	360,000
