= The More You Ignore Me, the Closer I Get =

1994 single by Morrissey

Single by Morrissey

from the album Vauxhall and I
- B-side: "Used to Be a Sweet Boy"; "I'd Love To"
- Released: 28 February 1994
- Studio: Hook End Manor (Checkendon, England)
- Genre: Indie pop
- Length: 3:43
- Label: Parlophone
- Songwriters: Morrissey, Boz Boorer
- Producer: Steve Lillywhite

Morrissey singles chronology
"Certain People I Know" (1992)	"The More You Ignore Me, the Closer I Get" (1994)	"Hold On to Your Friends" (1994)

"The More You Ignore Me, the Closer I Get" is a song by English singer-songwriter Morrissey, co-written by Boz Boorer and released as a single on 28 February 1994, by Parlophone. It was taken from the then-unreleased Vauxhall and I album and was the first Morrissey single to be produced by Steve Lillywhite. The extra B-side "I'd Love To" features Kirsty MacColl on backing vocals.

Reaching number eight on the UK Singles Chart, the single became Morrissey's first top-10 hit since "Interesting Drug" in 1989. It is also Morrissey's only charting single on both the US Billboard Hot 100 and Cash Box Top 100 charts, reaching numbers 46 and 51, and it became his second Modern Rock Tracks number-one hit. The song also reached the top 50 in Canada, France and Ireland. It charted the highest in Iceland, where it reached number two for three weeks.

== Versions ==
The US and UK single releases each contained slightly different mixes of the track. Both mixes use the same take of the song, but the US version, featuring less guitar, is three seconds shorter and includes additional synthesized sound effects (a percussive, glassy sound) throughout the song. The same synth effects are barely audible in the UK mix and in sections are completely absent. The US version of "I'd Love To" later appeared on the 1998 US compilation My Early Burglary Years. The UK version was included on the track listing on the 1997 CD reissue of Viva Hate, despite not being a contemporaneous recording from those sessions.

== Critical reception ==
NME gave the single a negative review, describing the song as a "formless neutered ramble" and that his "gleaming reputation tarnishes" with this release.

Ned Raggett of AllMusic said that initially the track "seemed a bit clumsy, with slightly repetitious lyrics and a bit of lazy feeling to it", but it was ultimately "another Morrissey classic, with good production from Steve Lillywhite and a low-key but confident performance from the band." The B-side "Used to Be a Sweet Boy" was "more immediately affecting", and non-album track "I'd Like To" [sic] had a "mysterious, spacious band performance." Tom Breihan of Stereogum commented, "Morrissey is really, really good at faux-sincerely crooning about making himself a central part of your mind's landscape whether you care or do not" and concluded that the song "probably isn't the best illustration of the Morrissey thing, but it's a pretty classic example."

== Live performances ==
The song was performed live by Morrissey on his 1995, 1999–2000 and 2004 tours.

== Track listings ==
- 7-inch vinyl and cassette
1. "The More You Ignore Me, the Closer I Get"
2. "Used to Be a Sweet Boy"
- 12-inch vinyl and CD (UK)
1. "The More You Ignore Me, the Closer I Get"
2. "Used to Be a Sweet Boy"
3. "I'd Love To" (UK version)
- CD (US)
1. "The More You Ignore Me, the Closer I Get"
2. "Used to Be a Sweet Boy"
3. "I'd Love To" (USA version)

Country	Record label	Format	Catalogue number
UK	Parlophone	7-inch vinyl	R6372
UK	Parlophone	12-inch vinyl	12R6372
UK	Parlophone	Compact disc	CDR6372
UK	Parlophone	Cassette	TCR6372

== Personnel ==
- Morrissey – vocals
- Alain Whyte – guitar
- Boz Boorer – guitar
- Jonny Bridgwood – bass guitar
- Woodie Taylor – drums

== Charts ==
=== Weekly charts ===
Chart (1994)	Peak position
Australia (ARIA)	85
Canada Top Singles (RPM)	34
Europe (Eurochart Hot 100)	17
France (SNEP)	42
Iceland (Íslenski Listinn Topp 40)	2
Ireland (IRMA)	24
Israel (Israeli Singles Chart)	28
Scottish Singles Sales (Official Charts)	7
UK Singles (Official Charts)	8
UK Airplay (Music Week)	14
US Billboard Hot 100	46
US Alternative Airplay (Billboard)	1
US Pop Airplay (Billboard)	39
US Cash Box Top 100	51

=== Year-end charts ===
Chart (1994)	Position
Iceland (Íslenski Listinn Topp 40)	13
US Modern Rock Tracks (Billboard)	33

== Release history ==
Region	Date	Format(s)	Label(s)	Ref.
United Kingdom	28 February 1994	7-inch vinyl; 12-inch vinyl; CD; cassette	Parlophone	
Australia	21 March 1994	CD; cassette	Parlophone	

== See also ==
- Morrissey discography
- The More You Ignore Me (2018 film)
