= Certain People I Know =

1992 single by Morrissey

Single by Morrissey

from the album Your Arsenal
- B-side: "Jack the Ripper"; "You've Had Her"
- Released: 7 December 1992
- Genre: Rockabilly
- Length: 3:12
- Label: His Master's Voice
- Songwriters: Morrissey; Alain Whyte
- Producer: Mick Ronson

Morrissey singles chronology
"Tomorrow" (1992)	"Certain People I Know" (1992)	"The More You Ignore Me, the Closer I Get" (1994)

Professional ratings
Review scores
Source	Rating
AllMusic	2.5/5 stars

"Certain People I Know" is a song by English singer-songwriter Morrissey, released in December 1992, by label His Master's Voice, as the third single from his third studio album, Your Arsenal (1992). It was the third and final Morrissey single to be produced by glam rock musician Mick Ronson. Reaching number 35 in the UK Singles Chart, the song had the distinction of being Morrissey's lowest-charting solo single up to that point.

"Certain People I Know" was the first Morrissey single to be released following the singer's bottling off stage at the Madstock festival when he supported Madness and the subsequent NME story regarding his alleged racism. This led to the single cover being changed from featuring the singer's name spelt out in the colours of the Union Jack to plain black writing.

== Reviews ==
Ned Raggett of AllMusic called the lead track "a bit of an odd choice" for a single but added that its B-sides "are among Morrissey's best".

== Track listings ==
- 7-inch vinyl and cassette
1. "Certain People I Know" (Morrissey, Alain Whyte)
2. "Jack the Ripper" (Morrissey, Boz Boorer)
- 12-inch vinyl and CD
1. "Certain People I Know"
2. "You've Had Her" (Morrissey, Boorer)
3. "Jack the Ripper"

Country	Record label	Format	Catalogue number
UK	His Master's Voice	7-inch vinyl	POP1631
UK	His Master's Voice	12-inch vinyl	12POP1631
UK	His Master's Voice	Compact disc	CDPOP1631
UK	His Master's Voice	Cassette	TCPOP1631

== Musicians ==
- Morrissey: Voice
- Alain Whyte: Guitar
- Boz Boorer: Guitar
- Gary Day: Bass Guitar
- Spencer Cobrin: Drums

== Charts ==
Chart (1992–93)	Peak position
Australia (ARIA)	104
UK Singles (OCC)	35
UK Airplay (Music Week)	23
