= Viva Hate =

1988 English studio album by Morrissey

Studio album by Morrissey
- Released: 14 March 1988
- Recorded: October–December 1987
- Studios: The Wool Hall, Beckington, UK
- Genre: Alternative rock
- Length: 42:16
- Labels: His Master's Voice (UK); Sire/Reprise (US & Canada); EMI (Australia & New Zealand)
- Producer: Stephen Street

Morrissey chronology
Viva Hate (1988)	Bona Drag (1990)

1997 re-release cover

Singles from Viva Hate
- 1. "Suedehead" Released: 15 February 1988; 2. "Everyday Is Like Sunday" Released: 30 May 1988

"Everyday Is Like Sunday"
"Everyday Is Like Sunday" audio sample

Viva Hate is the debut solo studio album by the English singer Morrissey recorded only two months after The Smiths disbanded. It was released on 14 March 1988 by His Master's Voice, six months after the final studio album by the Smiths, Strangeways, Here We Come (1987).

Vini Reilly, the leader of the English post-punk band the Durutti Column, played guitar on the album. Producer Stephen Street, who had contributed to multiple Smiths releases, served as the bassist and wrote the music.

== Background ==
The origins of Viva Hate date to when Smiths co-producer Stephen Street sent Morrissey demos that could potentially be used for Smiths B-sides released after Johnny Marr's departure from the band. Morrissey liked the demos and decided to collaborate with Street for a debut solo album. Morrissey commented on his and Street's partnership in a 1988 interview, "Working with Stephen as a producer is quite different from writing with him, and even his personality has changed dramatically, within this sphere; he's more relaxed, and more exciting." Morrissey also contrasted the "aggressive" musicianship of Marr with Street's "gentle side," describing the latter as "something I find totally precious."

Viva Hate was recorded between October and December 1987. For the album, Street played bass and recruited drummer Andrew Paresi and Durutti Column guitarist Vini Reilly. Morrissey praised the "beauty" and "erotic" quality of Reilly's guitar work while also noting his sense of humor.

After the album was released, Reilly claimed every song on the album except "Suedehead" had been composed by Morrissey and Reilly. Street has denied this. In an interview in 2014 Vini Reilly said "I want to talk about Stephen Street about whom I've said wrong things in the past; this is not an excuse, this is fact, I have suffered from what they call 'displaced anger' and this is where you're very angry with yourself and you don't understand, you just shout at people you really care about."

== Release ==
Viva Hate was released on 14 March 1988 by record label His Master's Voice.

EMI Australia considered Viva Hate too harsh a title and renamed the album Education in Reverse for LP release in Australia and New Zealand, the same title appearing as an etching on the vinyl.

The American release included the track "Hairdresser on Fire", which had been released in the UK as a B-side to "Suedehead", as track 9. This same track was released on a 7" single that was sold with the album in Japan.

The track "Margaret on the Guillotine", which described the death of then-prime minister Margaret Thatcher as a "wonderful dream", led to Morrissey briefly being questioned by the Special Branch.

It was certified Gold by the RIAA on 16 November 1993.

In 1997, EMI, in celebration of their 100th anniversary, released a remastered special edition of this album in the UK. It features different cover art and a different booklet (it has a photograph of a billboard for the 1993 live album Beethoven Was Deaf and drops the lyrics) as well as eight bonus tracks – only one of which was contemporaneous with the album. "Hairdresser on Fire" does not appear on this version.

A newly remastered, special edition of Viva Hate, supervised by Stephen Street, was released on 2 April 2012. This edition controversially omits, along with the name of Vini Reilly, one of the original album's tracks, "The Ordinary Boys", and includes the session outtake "Treat Me Like a Human Being". Also, the extended fadeout of "Late Night, Maudlin Street" has been removed. Stephen Street has said that he felt these changes were a mistake but that the track selection was changed at Morrissey's insistence. "Hairdresser on Fire", again, is also not included on this edition. Additionally, the typeface font on the front cover had been changed.

== Critical reception ==
Professional ratings
Review scores
Source	Rating
AllMusic	4.5/5 stars
Chicago Sun-Times	3.5/4 stars
Los Angeles Times	2.5/4 stars
Mojo	4/5 stars
NME	8/10
Pitchfork	7.3/10
Q	4/5 stars
Rolling Stone	4/5 stars
Uncut	8/10
The Village Voice	B

Viva Hate was generally well received by music critics. Rolling Stone, which had expected the now solo artist to "wallow", called the album "a tight, fairly disciplined affair". In its retrospective review, Pitchfork called the album "one of Morrissey's most interesting records, and certainly his riskiest", and that its "strange mix of pomp and minimal languor makes Viva Hate the only Morrissey LP you'd consider listening to just for its music".

A negative review came from Spin, who wrote "without guitarist/composer Johnny Marr at his side, the mahatma of mope rock seems to have gone out for a nice depressing stroll without noticing that he didn't have a stitch to wear".

Viva Hate was listed by Q as one of the top 50 albums of 1988. The album was also included in the book 1001 Albums You Must Hear Before You Die (2005).

== Track listing ==
All lyrics are written by Morrissey; all music is composed by Stephen Street and arranged by Vini Reilly.

Side one
No.	Title	Length
1.	"Alsatian Cousin"	3:13
2.	"Little Man, What Now?"	1:48
3.	"Everyday Is Like Sunday"	3:32
4.	"Bengali in Platforms"	3:55
5.	"Angel, Angel, Down We Go Together"	1:40
6.	"Late Night, Maudlin Street"	7:40

Side two
No.	Title	Length
7.	"Suedehead"	3:56
8.	"Break Up the Family"	3:55
9.	"The Ordinary Boys"	3:10
10.	"I Don't Mind If You Forget Me"	3:17
11.	"Dial-a-Cliché"	2:28
12.	"Margaret on the Guillotine"	3:42
Total length:		42:16

US bonus track
No.	Title	Length
9.	"Hairdresser on Fire"	3:51

EMI centenary edition bonus tracks
No.	Title	Writer(s)	Length
13.	"Let the Right One Slip In"	Morrissey; Alain Whyte; Gary Day	2:28
14.	"Pashernate Love"	Morrissey; Whyte; Day	2:16
15.	"At Amber"		2:43
16.	"Disappointed" (live)		3:07
17.	"Girl Least Likely To"	Morrissey; Andy Rourke	4:51
18.	"I'd Love To"	Morrissey; Boz Boorer	4:49
19.	"Michael's Bones"		3:10
20.	"I've Changed My Plea to Guilty"	Morrissey; Mark E. Nevin	3:42

2012 remastered special edition bonus track
No.	Title	Length
9.	"Treat Me Like a Human Being"	2:27

== Personnel ==
Credits are adapted from the Viva Hate liner notes.

- Morrissey – vocals, lyricist, sleeve art
- Stephen Street – bass guitar, guitar, songwriter, producer
- Vini Reilly – guitars, keyboards
- Andrew Paresi – drums
- Richard Koster – violin
- Fenella Barton – violin
- Rachel Maguire – cello
- Mark Davies – cello
- Robert Woolhard – cello
- John Metcalfe – viola
- Steve Williams – assistant engineer
- Anton Corbijn – photography
- Linder Sterling – photography
- Eamon Macabe – photography
- Jo Slee – art coordinator
- Caryn Gough – layout assistance
- Mick Ronson - producer, "Let the Right One Slip In", "Pashernate Love"
- Clive Langer - producer, "Girl Least Likely To", "I've Changed My Plea to Guilty"
- Alan Winstanley - producer, "Girl Least Likely To", "I've Changed My Plea to Guilty"
- Steve Lillywhite - producer, "I'd Love To"

== Charts ==
Chart performance for Viva Hate
Chart (1988)	Peak position
Australian Albums (Australian Music Report)	21
Dutch Albums	12
German Albums	33
New Zealand Albums	8
Norwegian Albums	20
Swedish Albums	27
UK Albums Chart	1
US Billboard 200	48

== Certifications ==
Certifications for Viva Hate
Region	Certification	Certified units/sales
United Kingdom (BPI)	Gold	100,000^{^}
United States (RIAA)	Gold	500,000^{^}
^{^} Shipments figures based on certification alone.
