= Glamorous Glue =

2011 single by Morrissey

Single by Morrissey

from the album Your Arsenal
- B-side: "Treat Me Like a Human Being"; "Safe, Warm Lancashire Home"
- Released: 18 April 2011
- Genre: Alternative rock, glam rock
- Length: 4:01
- Label: Major Minor
- Songwriters: Alain Whyte, Morrissey
- Producer: Mick Ronson

Morrissey singles chronology
"Everyday Is Like Sunday" (2010)	"Glamorous Glue" (2011)	"Suedehead (Mael Mix)" (2012)

Music video
- "Glamorous Glue" by Morrissey on YouTube

"Glamorous Glue" is a song released by English singer Morrissey in 1992 on the album Your Arsenal. The song has been used in promotions for the Fox television series Lie to Me, and reached number 13 on Billboard magazine's Hot Modern Rock Tracks chart.

== Single release ==
In February 2011, it was announced the song would be re-issued on limited edition 7" vinyl and CD formats with two previously unreleased B-sides: "Safe, Warm Lancashire Home" and "Treat Me Like a Human Being". This re-issue charted at number 69 on the UK Singles Chart, thus replacing "Hold On to Your Friends" as Morrissey's lowest charting single.

=== Track listings ===
CD (Major Minor CDMM722)

- "Glamorous Glue"
- "Treat Me Like a Human Being"
- "Glamorous Glue" (video)

7" (Major Minor MM722)

- "Glamorous Glue"
- "Safe, Warm Lancashire Home"

7" picture disc (Major Minor MMPD722)

- "Glamorous Glue"
- "Treat Me Like A Human Being"

The 7" has the etching "OUR RAYMOND OUR DOUGLAS OUR BUNNY". Raymond, Douglas and Bunny were the sons of Queenie Shepherd (Diana Dors) in the TV series Queenie's Castle.
