= Tomorrow (Morrissey song) =

1992 single by Morrissey

Single by Morrissey

from the album Your Arsenal
- B-side: "Let the Right One Slip In"; "Pashernate Love"; "There Speaks a True Friend"
- Released: September 1992
- Genre: Glam rock
- Length: 4:17
- Label: Sire
- Songwriters: Morrissey; Alain Whyte
- Producer: Mick Ronson

Morrissey singles chronology
"You're the One for Me, Fatty" (1992)	"Tomorrow" (1992)	"Certain People I Know" (1992)

Professional ratings
Review scores
Source	Rating
AllMusic	3/5 stars

"Tomorrow" is a US-only single released by Morrissey in September 1992. It reached number one on Billboard magazine's Hot Modern Rock Tracks chart. It is a remix of the final track of Morrissey's Your Arsenal album of the same year.

The music video for "Tomorrow" tracked Morrissey and his band walking through streets in England. The video was directed by Zack Snyder. Snyder later commented, "[Morrissey] decided that I was going to shoot all his videos from then on. But then he ghosted me after that. I don't know what happened."

Stereogum critic Tom Breihan called "Tomorrow" his favorite Morrissey song, praising the song's "windmill-arm opening riff", "great walking bassline" and the juxtaposition of Morrissey's "rich, sonorous confidence" with the "manifestly not confident" lyrics.

== Track listings ==
CD version (9 40580-2)

1. "Tomorrow" (Morrissey, Alain Whyte) – 4:17
2. "Let the Right One Slip In" (Morrissey, Whyte, Gary Day) – 2:26
3. "Pashernate Love" (Morrissey, Whyte, Day) – 2:22

12-inch version (0-40580)

1. "Tomorrow" (Morrissey, Whyte) – 4:17
2. "Let the Right One Slip In" (Morrissey, Whyte, Day) – 2:26
3. "There Speaks a True Friend" – 2:19

== Credits ==
- Management = Nigel Thomas
- Producer = Mick Ronson
- Mixed By = Steve Peck
- Mixing Assistant = Hal Belknap
- Mixed at = Electric Lady Studios, Studio C
- Performer [Players] = Alain Whyte
- Performer [Players] = Boz Boorer
- Performer [Players] = Gary Day
- Performer [Players] = Spencer Cobrin
- Photography By [Front Cover] = Linder Sterling
- Sleeve = Designland
- Sleeve = E. Riff
- Sleeve = Jo Slee

== Charts ==
=== Weekly charts ===
Chart (1992)	Peak position
US Alternative Airplay (Billboard)	1

=== Year-end charts ===
Chart (1992)	Position
US Modern Rock Tracks (Billboard)	8

== See also ==
- List of Billboard Modern Rock Tracks number ones of the 1990s
