= Boxers (song) =

1995 single by Morrissey

Single by Morrissey

from the album World of Morrissey
- B-side: "Have-a-Go Merchant"; "Whatever Happens, I Love You"
- Released: 16 January 1995
- Length: 3:28
- Label: Parlophone
- Songwriter(s): Morrissey, Alain Whyte
- Producer(s): Steve Lillywhite

Morrissey singles chronology
"Now My Heart Is Full" (1994)	"Boxers" (1995)	"Dagenham Dave" (1995)

Alternative covers
- US single cover

"Boxers" is a song by English singer-songwriter Morrissey, released in January 1995 to promote a tour of the same name. The single reached number 23 on the UK Singles Chart despite not appearing on an album at the time of the release. The title track and the two B-sides would later be compiled on the World of Morrissey that was released in February that year.

== Critical reception ==
The single was given a favourable review in Q magazine, with Ian Harrison writing that the song "is as good as anything he's done" and that the single made you "realise how few singers can leave you as despondent, elated or intrigued". NME gave it a negative review, with John Mulvey declaring the single was "just another example of his tedious obsession with bits of rough who'd give him a kicking given half a chance" and that "any enjoyment of his records nowadays is tainted by the fact that a nasty taste from all those obnoxious, apologist, quasi-libertarian quotes still lingers."

In his review for AllMusic, Ned Raggett found the song to be "a fine enough number, with a good overall performance and production to recommend it."

== Track listings ==
7-inch vinyl and cassette

1. "Boxers"
2. "Have-a-Go Merchant"

12-inch vinyl and CD

1. "Boxers"
2. "Have-a-Go Merchant"
3. "Whatever Happens, I Love You"

Country	Record label	Format	Catalogue number
UK	Parlophone	7-inch vinyl	R6400
UK	Parlophone	12-inch vinyl	12R6400
UK	Parlophone	Compact disc	CDR6400
UK	Parlophone	Cassette	TCR6400

== Personnel ==
- Morrissey: vocals
- Alain Whyte: guitar
- Boz Boorer: guitar, sax, clarinet
- Jonny Bridgwood: bass guitar
- Woodie Taylor: drums
