= Everyday Is Like Sunday =

1988 single by Morrissey

- Artwork for original 1988 single

Single by Morrissey

from the album Viva Hate
- B-side: "Disappointed"; "Sister I'm a Poet"; "Will Never Marry"
- Released: 30 May 1988
- Genre: Alternative rock
- Length: 3:33
- Label: His Master's Voice
- Songwriters: Morrissey; Stephen Street
- Producer: Stephen Street

Morrissey singles chronology
"Suedehead" (1988)	"Everyday Is Like Sunday" (1988)	"The Last of the Famous International Playboys" (1989)

Morrissey singles chronology
"Something Is Squeezing My Skull" (2009)	"Everyday Is Like Sunday" (2010)	"Glamorous Glue" (2011)

Music video
- "Everyday Is Like Sunday" on YouTube

"Everyday Is Like Sunday" is the third track of Morrissey's debut solo album, Viva Hate, and the second single to be released by the artist. Co-written by Morrissey and former Smiths producer Stephen Street, the song was Morrissey's second release after the Smiths break-up. Morrissey was inspired lyrically by Nevil Shute's On the Beach to lament the drudgery of a seaside town. Street, who had originally sought to contribute his musical ideas to Morrissey to use for Smiths B-sides, also contributed bass guitar, which he says was inspired by Echo & the Bunnymen.

"Everyday Is Like Sunday" was featured on Morrissey's debut album, Viva Hate, and the compilation album Bona Drag. Upon release, the single, featuring the B-sides "Disappointed", "Will Never Marry", and "Sister I'm a Poet", saw commercial and critical success, reaching number nine in the UK and garnering rave reviews for its evocative lyrics and bombastic music. Encouraged by the success of the single, Morrissey would continue working with Street for subsequent singles.

Since its release, "Everyday Is Like Sunday" has become one of Morrissey's most successful songs and remains critically acclaimed by modern writers. It has also inspired the cult Canadian film Everyday Is Like Sunday.

== Background ==
"Everyday Is Like Sunday" was co-written by Morrissey and Stephen Street, the songwriting team behind Morrissey's debut solo single "Suedehead". Street, who initially believed the Smiths would reunite within a few months of breaking up, initially sent demos of his instrumental tracks to Morrissey as possible ideas for Smiths B-sides. The song's lyrics, which commemorate the dreariness of a seaside town in the off-season, were reportedly inspired by Nevil Shute's On the Beach, a novel about a group of people waiting for nuclear devastation in Melbourne, Australia. Of the song's lyrics, Morrissey commented, "The British holiday resort is just like a symbol of Britain's absurdity really. The idea of a resort in Britain doesn't seem natural."

In addition to composing the song's music, Stephen Street performed bass on the song. He commented, "'Everyday Is Like Sunday' was me trying to be the bass player of Echo & the Bunnymen! The chords are quite simple, but again the bassline was a big part of the songwriting." Street recruited drummer Andrew Parisi and guitarist Vini Reilly to round out the studio band. Street recalled of the latter, "Vini turned around and said to me 'I'm not playing that song, it's too bloody simple' – well that song was 'Everyday Is Like Sunday'! He's a musical snob in some respects – he's incredibly frustrating."

According to Street, "Everyday Is Like Sunday" was recorded in his second session with Morrissey. The song features a six-piece string section, led by violinist Fenella Barton.

== Release ==
"Everyday Is Like Sunday" was, like "Suedehead," noted as a potential single early in the song's recording process. Street recalled, "Obviously ['Sunday'] has such a great classic vibe to it. I think those two songs did kind of stand out as the most single-like tracks on [Viva Hate]."

The single was released in May 1988, with the B-sides "Disappointed", "Will Never Marry", and "Sister I'm a Poet". Written after the Viva Hate sessions, these B-sides would be hailed by Street as him "really getting into gear" and Morrissey as "a progression from Viva Hate" and "quite magical." The single, featuring artwork of Morrissey that Sounds compared to "a stubbleless George Michael", achieved similar commercial success to its predecessor, reaching number nine on the UK Singles Chart. In addition to appearing on his first solo album Viva Hate, "Everyday Is Like Sunday" appeared on the 1990 compilation album Bona Drag. "Disappointed" and "Will Never Marry" also appeared on Bona Drag.

On 27 September 2010, the single was re-issued on CD and two 7-inch formats, including the unreleased "November the Second", an alternative mix of "November Spawned a Monster". This re-issue debuted at number 42 on the UK singles chart. It coincided with the 20th-anniversary re-issue of his 1990 compilation Bona Drag.

== Critical reception ==
Professional ratings
Review scores
Source	Rating
AllMusic	3/5 stars

Everyday Is Like Sunday

Upon its release, "Everyday Is Like Sunday" saw critical acclaim. NME praised the song as "glorious, swooning pop," writing, "It's the one song on the album that would stand up as an instrumental and lyrically it confirms its writer's reputation as one of the most skillful chroniclers of all that is shabby and drab and joyless in this sceptered isle". Sounds named it one of the "perfect moments" on Viva Hate calling it "a perfect rebuff to the Cliff Richard 'Summer Holiday' hit syndrome with its drizzly chorus, 'Everyday is like Sunday/Everyday is silent and grey'."

Since then, the song has been recognized as one of Morrissey's best. Ned Raggett of AllMusic called the song "the unquestioned highlight of Viva Hate" as well as "one of Morrissey's most memorable numbers in and out of the Smiths." He elaborated, "Street's orchestrations fit the melancholic surge of the music to a T, while Morrissey's portrait of a "seaside town that they forgot to bomb" is evocative and given a bravura vocal." Spin listed it as the number one Morrissey solo song, writing, "This is the Platonic ideal of Morrissey songs. ... While some may roll their eyes, few songs illuminate the alienation and boredom of suburbia (or small-town life) better than this." The Guardian also named it first on their list of top Morrissey songs, writing, "The reason it's one of his strongest early singles is because it exists in a masterfully imagined, ennui-laden world of its own. Here, in the 'seaside town that they forgot to bomb', there’s no acrimony or draining divorce – just drudgery in the world's snooziest holiday destination."

"Everyday Is Like Sunday" has also seen great acclaim from Morrissey's contemporary musicians. In a September 1992 edition of Q magazine, Pretenders frontwoman Chrissie Hynde (who would later record her own version of the song) said that the "lyric to 'Everyday Is Like Sunday' is, to me, a masterful piece of prose." In the same piece, Bananarama's Siobhan Fahey described it as her "all-time top song". In Morrissey's autobiography, he recalls that REM's Michael Stipe told him that he was "very jealous" of "Everyday Is Like Sunday" and that it made him consider going solo.

== Music video ==
A music video directed by Tim Broad was created for "Everyday Is Like Sunday." The location used for the video was Southend-on-Sea. Throughout, Morrissey appears in the background of the video in roles such as a cyclist, a cafe customer and a shop assistant. Author David Bret asserts that this was based on the film Jacques Brel Is Alive and Well and Living in Paris, a film where Brel appeared in cameos intermittently throughout performances of his song by other musicians. Billie Whitelaw appears in a supporting role as does Cheryl Murray and Lucette Henderson as a young fan. Henderson had previously appeared in the video for the Smiths' video for "Stop Me If You Think You've Heard This One Before," while Whitelaw featured on the single artwork for "William, It Was Really Nothing." The video also features clips from the film Carry On Abroad, a favourite of Morrissey.

== Live performances ==
Morrissey performed the song on his solo debut on Top of the Pops, appearing in a The Queen Is Dead T-shirt and a blazer. The song has since been performed live by Morrissey on his 1991, 1992 (Festival Dates), 2002, 2004, 2006, 2007 and 2008 tours, and on his 2012 tour of Australia and New Zealand. In 2004 the song was played in a medley with the first verse of "Subway Train" by the New York Dolls.

== Track listings ==
7-inch vinyl

1. "Everyday Is Like Sunday"
2. "Disappointed"

12-inch vinyl, compact disc and cassette

1. "Everyday Is Like Sunday"
2. "Sister I'm a Poet"
3. "Disappointed"
4. "Will Never Marry"

=== 2010 re-issue ===
Compact disc

1. "Everyday Is Like Sunday" (2010 digital remaster)
2. "November the Second"
3. "Everyday Is Like Sunday"
4. "Everyday Is Like Sunday" (Top of the Pops – 9 June 1988)

7-inch single 1

1. "Everyday Is Like Sunday" (2010 digital remaster)
2. "Trash" (Live at Irvine Meadows)
- Although credited as being performed at Irvine Meadows, fans have pointed out that Morrissey did not perform at that venue in 1991, and that the live version of "Trash" is likely to have been recorded at the Pacific Amphitheatre in Costa Mesa, California on 1 June 1991.

7-inch single 2

1. "Everyday Is Like Sunday" (2010 digital remaster)
2. "Everyday Is Like Sunday" (live at the Hollywood Bowl – 8 June 2007)

== Personnel ==
- Morrissey: vocals
- Stephen Street: bass guitar
- Vini Reilly: guitar, piano
- Andrew Paresi: drums

== Charts ==
Chart (1988)	Peak position
Europe (Eurochart Hot 100)	32
Ireland (IRMA)	3
Italy Airplay (Music & Media)	7
Netherlands (Single Top 100)	76
New Zealand (Recorded Music NZ)	18
UK Singles (Official Charts)	9

Chart (2010)	Peak position
France (SNEP)	43
Scottish Singles Sales (Official Charts)	36
UK Singles (Official Charts)	42

== Certifications ==
Region	Certification	Certified units/sales
United Kingdom (BPI)	Silver	200,000^{‡}
^{‡} Sales+streaming figures based on certification alone.

== Release details ==
Country	Record label	Format	Catalogue number
UK	His Master's Voice	7-inch vinyl	POP1619
UK	His Master's Voice	12-inch vinyl	12POP1619
UK	His Master's Voice	Compact disc	CDPOP1619
UK	His Master's Voice	Cassette	TCPOP1619

== Cover versions ==
"Everyday Is Like Sunday" was covered by the Pretenders for the soundtrack to the film Boys on the Side. Morrissey commented at the time, "I do know that Chrissie Hynde is doing 'Everyday Is Like Sunday.' I've heard a demo version and, well, my cheeks are moist." The song has also been covered by 10,000 Maniacs (as a B-side to their single "Candy Everybody Wants"); the Estonian pop group Mr. Lawrence; the Armageddon Dildos (on the "Come Armageddon" maxi-single) and Mikel Erentxun (on his album Acrobatas). Colin Meloy of The Decemberists included the song on Colin Meloy Sings Morrissey. The Mexican tribute act Mexrrissey featured it (as "Cada Día Es Domingo") on their 2015 No Manchester album, and Canadian band The Tea Party released a cover as a bonus track on their 2021 album Blood Moon Rising.

In 2007, the alternative rock band Fate Or Trouble released a cover of "Everyday Is Like Sunday" as its debut single. The release received a positive single review from Billboard.

A mostly instrumental version (containing only the title lyric) was used in the NFL Network's "When all you want is football" television ad campaign.

== See also ==
- Morrissey discography
