= You're the One for Me, Fatty =

1992 single by Morrissey

Single by Morrissey

from the album Your Arsenal
- B-side: "Pashernate Love"; "There Speaks a True Friend"
- Released: 6 July 1992
- Genre: Alternative rock, jangle pop, rockabilly
- Length: 2:57
- Label: His Master's Voice
- Songwriters: Morrissey, Alain Whyte
- Producer: Mick Ronson

Morrissey singles chronology
| "We Hate It When Our Friends Become Successful" (1992) | "You're the One for Me, Fatty" (1992) | "Tomorrow" (1992) |

Professional ratings
Review scores
| Source | Rating |
|---|---|
| AllMusic | 4/5 stars |

"You're the One for Me, Fatty" is a single by Morrissey released in July 1992. It was taken from the then-unreleased Your Arsenal album and was the second Morrissey single to be co-written with Alain Whyte and produced by glam rock legend Mick Ronson. The song was written about Morrissey's friend and colleague Cathal Smyth, formerly of Madness, and the title is a reference to the Marvelettes' song "You Are the One for Me, Bobby". The track reached number 19 on the UK Singles Chart.

== Critical reception ==
This single was retrospectively described by Ned Raggett in AllMusic as "[a] smart, lively cut...with the overall title and overall mood still being as classically Morrissey as it gets." Raggett did not think the B-sides were as strong in comparison but still "fine enough numbers, further evidence as to how the Your Arsenal sessions had re-energized [Morrissey]." Raggett concludes his review, writing, "The tone throughout is relaxed and fun, almost in spite of some of the lyrics".

== Track listings ==
All lyrics were written by Morrissey. All music was composed by Alain Whyte except where noted.

| No. | Title | Music | Length |
|---|---|---|---|
| 1. | "You're the One for Me, Fatty" |
| 2. | "Pashernate Love" | Day/Whyte |
| 3. | "There Speaks a True Friend" (not included on 7-inch) |

| Country | Record label | Format | Catalogue number |
|---|---|---|---|
| UK | His Master's Voice | 7-inch vinyl | POP1630 |
| UK | His Master's Voice | 12-inch vinyl | 12POP1630 |
| UK | His Master's Voice | Compact disc | CDPOP1630 |
| UK | His Master's Voice | Cassette | TCPOP1630 |

== Personnel ==
- Morrissey – vocals
- Alain Whyte – guitar
- Boz Boorer – guitar
- Gary Day – bass guitar

== Charts ==
Chart performance for "You're the One for Me, Fatty"
| Chart (1992) | Peak position |
|---|---|
| Australia (ARIA) | 85 |
| Ireland (IRMA) | 16 |
| UK Singles (OCC) | 19 |
