= Sing Your Life =

1991 single by Morrissey

Single by Morrissey

from the album Kill Uncle
- B-side: "That's Entertainment"; "The Loop"
- Released: 1 April 1991
- Length: 3:29
- Label: His Master's Voice
- Songwriters: Morrissey; Mark Nevin
- Producers: Clive Langer; Alan Winstanley

Morrissey singles chronology
"Our Frank" (1990)	"Sing Your Life" (1991)	"Pregnant for the Last Time" (1991)

Professional ratings
Review scores
Source	Rating
AllMusic	4/5 stars

"Sing Your Life" is a single by the English singer Morrissey, released on 1 April 1991 by His Master's Voice. It was the second single taken from the Kill Uncle album, and was co-written by Mark E. Nevin, who plays guitar on the track. On release this was Morrissey's lowest charting single in the UK charts, reaching only number 33. It features former Madness frontman Suggs on backing vocals, who also sang backing vocals on the single "Piccadilly Palare". One of the single's B-sides was a cover version of "That's Entertainment" by the Jam which also had backing vocals by Carl Smyth, a.k.a. Chas Smash, the former second singer of the band Madness. Vic Reeves also recorded backing vocals for the song, but they weren't included in the final version. He is thanked in the sleeve notes.

== Critical review ==
Stuart Maconie in NME gave the single a positive review, calling it "toe-tapping". Ned Raggett of AllMusic called the song "one of Morrissey's subtler pieces, and also one with a more upbeat and straightforward message than most."

== Live performances ==
The song was performed live by Morrissey on his 1991 Kill Uncle tour. The song was last performed on 6 October 1991, and was dropped from the set list for the rest of the tour. "Sing Your Life" has never been performed by Morrissey since the 1991 tour, but it is frequently requested by his audience. When Morrissey hears the request, he usually replies by saying "I'm singing it."

== Track listings ==
7-inch vinyl and cassette

1. "Sing Your Life"
2. "That's Entertainment" (The Jam cover)

12-inch vinyl

1. "Sing Your Life"
2. "That's Entertainment" (The Jam cover)
3. "The Loop"

CD

1. "Sing Your Life"
2. "That's Entertainment" (The Jam cover)
3. "The Loop"

Region	Record label	Format	Catalogue number
UK	His Master's Voice	7-inch vinyl	POP1626
UK	His Master's Voice	12-inch vinyl	12POP1626
UK	His Master's Voice	Compact disc	CDPOP1626
UK	His Master's Voice	Cassette	TCPOP1626

== Musicians ==
- Morrissey – voice
- Mark E. Nevin – guitars
- Boz Boorer – guitars
- Andrew Paresi – drums
- Mark Bedford – bass
- Suggs – backing vocals
- Cathal Smyth – backing vocals on "That's Entertainment"

== Charts ==
Chart (1991)	Peak position
Ireland (IRMA)	21
UK Singles (Official Charts)	33
UK Airplay (Music Week)	44

== In popular culture ==
The song is featured prominently in season one, episode seven of the Netflix show Daybreak, when character Ms Crumble's passion for Morrissey's music forms an important plot point. It appears as the theme song of a fictitious post-apocalyptic sitcom, in a Spanish version performed by Ms Crumble's Morrissey cover band, and as a duet by characters Angelica (Alyvia Alyn Lind and Ms Crumble Krysta Rodriguez). The episode itself is called "Canta Tu Vida", the Spanish translation of the song's title.
