= Suedehead =

1988 single by Morrissey

Single by Morrissey

from the album Viva Hate
- B-side: "I Know Very Well How I Got My Name"; "Hairdresser on Fire"; "Oh Well, I'll Never Learn"
- Released: 15 February 1988
- Genre: Jangle pop
- Length: 3:54
- Label: His Master's Voice
- Songwriters: Morrissey; Stephen Street
- Producer: Stephen Street

Morrissey singles chronology
"Suedehead" (1988)	"Everyday Is Like Sunday" (1988)

Music video
- "Suedehead" on YouTube

Professional ratings
Review scores
Source	Rating
AllMusic	3/5 stars

"Suedehead" is the debut solo single by the English singer Morrissey, released on 15 February 1988. Co-written by Morrissey and former Smiths producer Stephen Street, the song was Morrissey's first solo release after the Smiths break-up. Morrissey was inspired lyrically by the suedehead subculture, recalling an individual from his teenage years in the context of the movement. Street, who had originally sought to contribute his musical ideas to Morrissey to use for Smiths B-sides, also contributed bass guitar, while Vini Reilly and Andrew Paresi rounded out his new solo band.

"Suedehead" was featured on Morrissey's debut album, Viva Hate, and the compilation album Bona Drag, the latter of which also featured the B-side "Hairdresser on Fire". Upon release, the song saw commercial success, reaching number five in the UK, as well as rave reviews for its Smiths-esque musicianship and the new Morrissey-Street writing team. Encouraged by the success of the single, Morrissey would continue working with Street for subsequent singles.

Since its release, "Suedehead" has become one of Morrissey's most successful songs and remains critically acclaimed by modern writers.

== Background ==
Morrissey wrote the lyrics to "Suedehead" about a figure he knew from his teenage years, though he refused to specify the individual in an interview, commenting, "I'd rather not give any addresses and phone numbers at this stage". The song took its title from the suedehead subculture. Morrissey elaborated on his feelings about the subculture in a June 1988 interview with Spin magazine:

A suedehead was an outgrown skinhead, but outgrown only in the hair sense. An outgrown skinhead who was slightly softer. Not a football hooligan. Back in '71, when youth cults were on the rampage in Manchester, there was a tremendous air of intensity and potential unpleasantness. Something interesting grabbed me about the whole thing. I don't think there were any good guys; everybody had several chips on several shoulders. There was a great velocity of hate. Everybody got their head kicked in. It's made me what I am today.

It shares a title with the Richard Allen book of the same name, which similarly was set in the subculture, but Morrissey commented, "I did happen to read the book when it came out and I was quite interested in the whole Richard Allen cult. But really I just like the word 'suedehead'." The song also features the lyrics, "It was a good lay", which Morrissey jokingly commented was actually a mishearing of "It was a bootleg".

"Suedehead" was Morrissey's first songwriting collaboration with former Smiths producer Stephen Street. Street, who initially believed the Smiths would reunite within a few months of breaking up, sent demos of his instrumental tracks to Morrissey as possible ideas for Smiths B-sides. With a band including Street, Vini Reilly, and Andrew Paresi, Morrissey attempted the song in his first solo recording session. With regards to his bassline, Street noted, "One thing I always picked up on working with the Smiths was that Morrissey often positions himself in relation to what the bassline is doing. So when I worked on 'Suedehead' I made the bassline melodic, not just root notes."

== Release ==
"Suedehead" was noted as a potential single early in the song's recording process. Street recalled, "I think that it was quite evident straight away that it was going to be a single. There was something about it that was really special." Morrissey commented in a 1988 interview that he was worried it "would gasp in the higher 30s and disintegrate" and that he was hesitant to release it but was "carried along on a wave of general enthusiasm." Street later disputed this, remembering, "Morrissey sent me a card saying, 'Don't read the interview'. I think he realised after he'd done it that he'd been a bit negative about things. The idea that he didn't want 'Suedehead' to be the single is utter rubbish, he was just as excited as anyone else about releasing it." The record label's affinity for the song helped assuage concerns with Street writing the whole Viva Hate album.

"Suedehead" was released by Morrissey as his debut solo single in February 1988. The single was a commercial smash in the UK, peaking at number five on the UK Singles Chart and reaching the top 10 in Ireland and New Zealand. The single charted higher than any of the singles Morrissey released while in his former band the Smiths. The commercial and critical success convinced Morrissey to continue his collaboration with Street, who recalled, "It wasn't until 'Suedehead' came out at the end of February – and got fantastic reviews across the board – that he got back in touch with me again. If 'Suedehead' had come out and been a complete failure and hadn't been a hit, I'd never have heard from him again!" In addition to appearing on Viva Hate, the song appeared on Morrissey's 1990 compilation album Bona Drag.

The music video, directed by Tim Broad, features Morrissey walking through the snowy streets of Fairmount, Indiana, the hometown of actor James Dean, including shots of the high school where Dean studied, the farm where he was raised and the Park Cemetery, where he is buried. Other allusions to Dean in the video include a child (played by Sam Esty Rayner, Morrissey's nephew, who went on to direct the video for "Kiss Me a Lot" in 2015) delivering to Morrissey a copy of Antoine de Saint-Exupéry's The Little Prince, Dean's favourite book. Morrissey characterised the video as him "messing with James Dean's soil."

The artwork of the single features a photo taken by Geri Caulfield during a Smiths gig at the London Palladium. Morrissey debuted the song live at his debut solo concert at Wolverhampton's Civic Hall in December 1988.

== Critical reception ==
Upon its release, "Suedehead" saw critical acclaim and was praised as a worthy successor to Morrissey's work in the Smiths. NME gave the single 'Single of the Week 2' saying that "his vocals hit a pitch that turns your stomach with queasy delight. It makes you feel vulnerable and provokes emotions you've forgotten about." In the 1988 NME Year in Review, the song was described as "The best No. 1 '88 never gave us". Sounds said in a 1988 article, "The song was not as good as prime Smiths, but it was a beautifully reflective tune, showing that ex-Smiths co-producer Stephen Street could step into Marr's previous role as composer."

In a retrospective review for AllMusic, critic Ned Raggett described it as "a memorable number, with Street's subtle orchestrations carrying the sweep of the song." Stereogum ranked it as Morrissey's best solo song, writing, "Perhaps Morrissey's best-known, most loved track and with good reason: It's unimpeachably, undeniably great, and utterly ubiquitous. If nothing else, Morrissey proved to us that, fresh out of the gate as a solo artist, he was able to write one of the best Smiths songs never written by the Smiths." Spin rated it his second best, writing, "The show of confidence on Morrissey’s debut solo single felt nothing less than triumphant." Consequence named it his fifth best, concluding, "Though 'Suedehead' is as jangly as any number of Smiths songs, it was just Morrissey enough to mark the clear start of a new era."

== Track listings ==
- 7-inch vinyl
1. "Suedehead"
2. "I Know Very Well How I Got My Name"
- 12-inch vinyl
1. "Suedehead"
2. "I Know Very Well How I Got My Name"
3. "Hairdresser on Fire"
- CD and cassette
1. "Suedehead"
2. "I Know Very Well How I Got My Name"
3. "Hairdresser on Fire"
4. "Oh Well, I'll Never Learn"

Country	Record label	Format	Catalogue number
UK	His Master's Voice	7-inch vinyl	POP1618
UK	His Master's Voice	12-inch vinyl	12POP1618
UK	His Master's Voice	CD	CDPOP1618
UK	His Master's Voice	Cassette	TCPOP1618

== Personnel ==
- Morrissey – vocals
- Stephen Street – bass guitar; guitar
- Vini Reilly – guitar; keyboards
- Andrew Paresi – drums; percussion

== Charts ==
Chart (1988)	Peak position
Australia (Australian Music Report)	45
Europe (Eurochart Hot 100)	19
Ireland (IRMA)	2
Italy Airplay (Music & Media)	5
Netherlands (Dutch Top 40 Tipparade)	2
Netherlands (Single Top 100)	30
New Zealand (Recorded Music NZ)	8
UK Singles (Official Charts)	5
West Germany (GfK)	29

== 2012 reissue ==
"Suedehead (Mael Mix)"

Single by Morrissey
- Released: 21 April 2012
- Length: 6:36
- Label: EMI (UK)

Morrissey singles chronology
"Glamorous Glue" (2011)	"Suedehead (Mael Mix)" (2012)	"The Last of the Famous International Playboys" (2013)

A remix of the song by American band Sparks was released for Record Store Day 2012. It is an edit of the remix originally released in 2006 on the compilation album Future Retro.

=== Track listing ===
10-inch (EMI 5593331)

- "Suedehead (Mael mix)"
- "We'll Let You Know" (live in London 1995)
- "Now My Heart Is Full" (live in London 1995)
