= List of artists by number of UK Independent Singles Chart number ones =

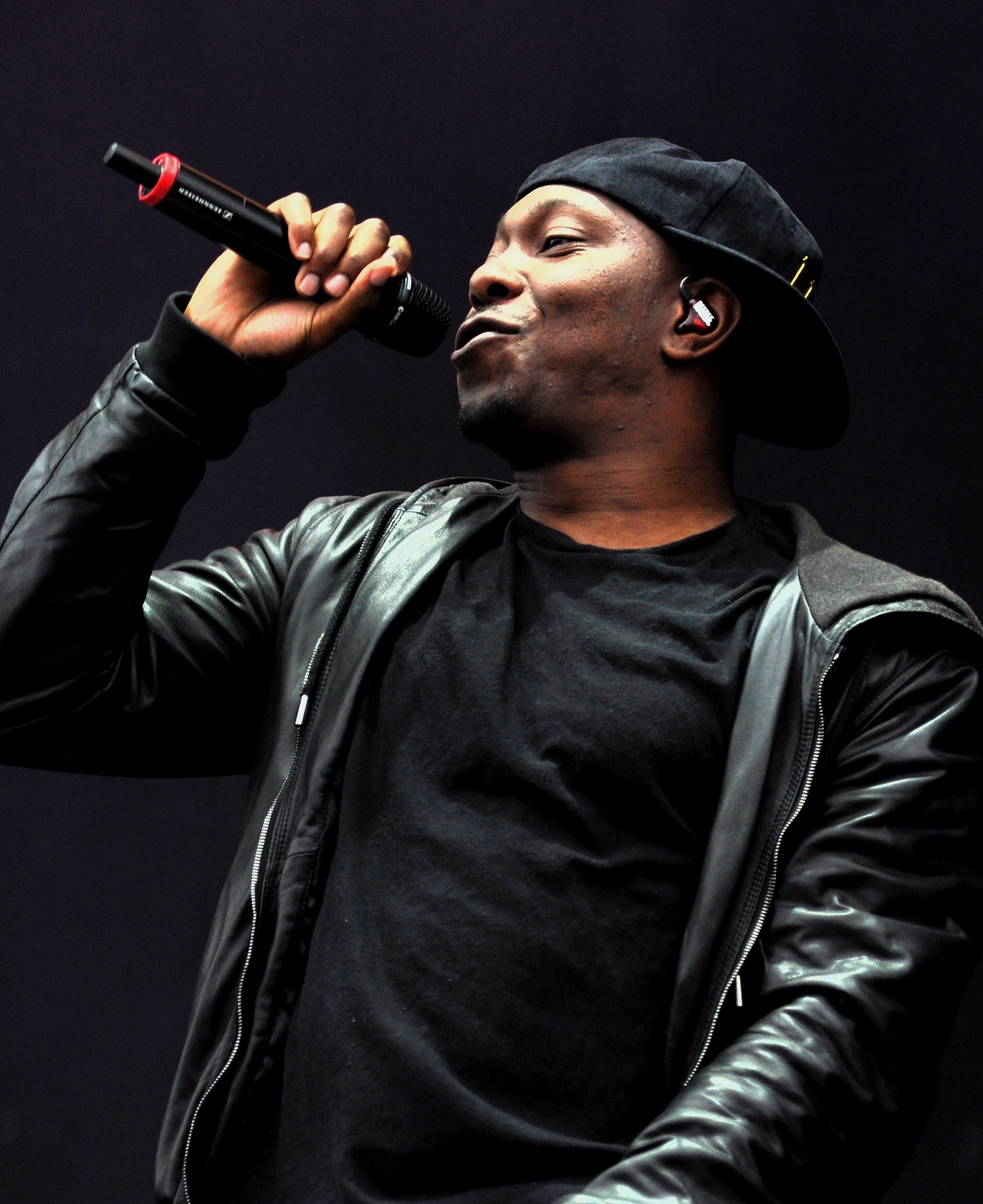
Dizzee Rascal has topped the UK Indie Chart with 11 songs and spent 37 weeks at number one.

The Independent Chart is a record chart which ranks the best-selling Independent songs in the United Kingdom. Compiled and published by the Official Charts Company, the data is based on each song's weekly physical sales, digital downloads (since 2007) and streams (since 2015), and is currently published every Friday. The chart was first published on 18 October 1997, when American boy band Backstreet Boys was number one with the "As Long as You Love Me" single. As of the chart ending on 26 November 2026, a total of 534 songs have topped the Independent Singles Chart. 7 artists have topped the chart with eight or more different songs. The most successful is British rapper Dizzee Rascal who has reached number one with 11 different songs followed by British Indie singer Adele, British band Arctic Monkeys and American singer Britney Spears who have all reached number one with 9 different songs, Morrissey, Steps and DJ Fresh have 8. The Current Number-One is "Movin' to the Sun" by Hugel, Imael Angel and Ultra Naté.

== Artists ==
The following artists have been credited on at least eight different number one songs, as recognised by the OCC.

Key
†	Indicates that the song reached the top ten of the UK Singles Chart

Artist	Number-one songs	Total weeks at number one	Songs	Record label(s)	First reached number one	Weeks at number one	Ref.
Dizzee Rascal	11	37	"Jus' A Rascal"	XL	30 November 2003	1	
Dizzee Rascal	11	37	"Stand Up Tall"	XL	4 September 2004	1	
Dizzee Rascal	11	37	"Dream"	XL	20 November 2004	1	
Dizzee Rascal	11	37	"Pussyole (Old Skool)"	XL	5 August 2007	1	
Dizzee Rascal	11	37	"Flex"	XL	25 November 2007	2	
Dizzee Rascal	11	37	"Dance Wiv Me"	Dirtee Stank	13 July 2008	9	
Dizzee Rascal	11	37	"Bonkers"	Dirtee Stank	24 May 2009	7	
Dizzee Rascal	11	37	"Holiday"	Dirtee Stank	30 August 2009	5	
Dizzee Rascal	11	37	"Dirtee Cash"	Dirtee Stank	22 November 2009	1	
Dizzee Rascal	11	37	"Dirtee Disco"	Dirtee Stank	30 May 2010	3	
Dizzee Rascal	11	37	"The Power"	Ministry of Sound"	17 June 2012	5	
Adele	9	57	"Chasing Pavements"	XL	27 January 2008	5	
Adele	9	57	"Make You Feel My Love"	XL	3 October 2010	10	
Adele	9	57	"Rolling in the Deep"	XL	23 January 2011	4	
Adele	9	57	"Someone Like You"	XL	20 February 2011	13	
Adele	9	57	"Skyfall"	XL	13 October 2012	13	
Adele	9	57	"Hello"	XL	5 November 2015	9	
Adele	9	57	"When We Were Young"	XL	10 March 2016	1	
Adele	9	57	"Send My Love (To Your New Lover)"	XL	16 June 2016	1	
Adele	9	57	"Water Under the Bridge"	XL	19 January 2017	1	
Britney Spears	9	25	"...Baby One More Time"	Jive	27 February 1999	4	
Britney Spears	9	25	"Sometimes"	Jive	26 June 1999	4	
Britney Spears	9	25	"Born to Make You Happy"	Jive	29 January 2000	3	
Britney Spears	9	25	"Oops!... I Did It Again"	Jive	13 May 2000	5	
Britney Spears	9	25	"Lucky"	Jive	26 August 2000	3	
Britney Spears	9	25	"I'm a Slave 4 U"	Jive	27 October 2001	3	
Britney Spears	9	25	"Overprotected"	Jive	27 January 2002	1	
Britney Spears	9	25	"I'm Not a Girl, Not Yet a Woman"	Jive	7 April 2002	1	
Britney Spears	9	25	"Boys"	Jive	4 August 2002	1	
Arctic Monkeys	9	19	"I Bet You Look Good on the Dancefloor"	Domino	23 October 2005	4	
Arctic Monkeys	9	19	"When the Sun Goes Down"	Domino	22 January 2006	3	
Arctic Monkeys	9	19	"Leave Before the Lights Come On"	Domino	22 January 2006	1	
Arctic Monkeys	9	19	"Brianstorm"	Domino	22 April 2007	4	
Arctic Monkeys	9	19	"Fluorescent Adolescent"	Domino	15 July 2007	3	
Arctic Monkeys	9	19	"Teddy Picker"	Domino	9 December 2007	1	
Arctic Monkeys	9	19	"Crying Lightning"	Domino	12 July 2009	1	
Arctic Monkeys	9	19	"Why'd You Only Call Me When You're High?"	Domino	24 August 2013	1	
Arctic Monkeys	9	19	"Body Paint"	Domino	3 November 2022	1	
Morrissey	8	10	"Irish Blood, English Heart"	Attack	22 May 2004	2	
Morrissey	8	10	"First of the Gang to Die"	Attack	24 July 2004	2	
Morrissey	8	10	"Let Me Kiss You"	Attack	23 October 2004	1	
Morrissey	8	10	"I Have Forgiven Jesus"	Attack	25 December 2004	1	
Morrissey	8	10	"Redondo Beach"/"There Is a Light That Never Goes Out"	Attack	3 April 2005	1	
Morrissey	8	10	"You Have Killed Me"	Attack	2 April 2006	1	
Morrissey	8	10	"In the Future When All's Well"	Attack	27 August 2006	1	
Morrissey	8	10	"I Just Want to See the Boy Happy"	Attack	10 December 2006	1	
Steps	8	11	"5,6,7,8"	Jive	27 December 1997	2	
Steps	8	11	"One for Sorrow"	Jive	5 September 1998	1	
Steps	8	11	"Heartbeat/Tragedy"	Jive	28 November 1998	8	
Steps	8	11	"Better Best Forgotten"	Jive	20 March 1999	1	
Steps	8	11	"Love's Got a Hold on My Heart"	Jive	24 July 1999	2	
Steps	8	11	"Say You'll Be Mine"/"Better the Devil You Know"	Jive	1 January 2000	3	
Steps	8	11	"It's the Way You Make Me Feel"	Jive	13 January 2001	2	
Steps	8	11	"Chain Reaction"/"One for Sorrow"	Jive	6 October 2001	3	
DJ Fresh	8	38	"Louder"	Ministry of Sound	10 July 2011	6	
DJ Fresh	8	38	"Hot Right Now"	Ministry of Sound	19 February 2012	10	
DJ Fresh	8	38	"The Power"	Ministry of Sound	17 June 2012	6	
DJ Fresh	8	38	"Earthquake"	Ministry of Sound	17 June 2012	3	
DJ Fresh	8	38	"Dibby Dibby Sound"	Ministry of Sound	5 February 2014	5	
DJ Fresh	8	38	"Make U Bounce"	Ministry of Sound	12 July 2014	2	
DJ Fresh	8	38	"Flashlight"	Ministry of Sound	11 October 2014	1	
DJ Fresh	8	38	"Gravity"	Ministry of Sound	21 February 2015	8	

== See also ==
- List of artists by number of UK Albums Chart number ones
- List of artists by number of UK Singles Chart number ones
