= List of UK Independent Singles Chart number ones of 2004 =

These are the Official Charts Company UK Official Indie Chart number one hits of 2004.

Issue date	Song	Artist
3 January ^{[a]}	"Mad World"	Michael Andrews featuring Gary Jules
10 January	"Mad World"	Michael Andrews featuring Gary Jules
17 January	"Mad World"	Michael Andrews featuring Gary Jules
24 January	"Mad World"	Michael Andrews featuring Gary Jules
31 January	"Take Me Out"	Franz Ferdinand
7 February	"Last Train Home"	Lostprophets
14 February	"Take Me Out"	Franz Ferdinand
21 February	"Moviestar"	Stereophonics
28 February	"Can't Get Enough"	Raghav featuring Iceberg Slimm
6 March	"Restless"	JX
13 March	"Cop That Shit"	Timbaland & Magoo featuring Missy Elliott
20 March	"Love Revolution"	Phixx
27 March	"Somebody Told Me"	The Killers
3 April	"Love Is Only a Feeling"	The Darkness
10 April	"Love Is Only a Feeling"	The Darkness
17 April	"I Like It"	Narcotic Thrust
24 April	"For Lovers"	Wolfman featuring Pete Doherty
1 May	"Matinee"	Franz Ferdinand
8 May	"Matinee"	Franz Ferdinand
15 May	"Wake Up (Make a Move)"	Lost Prophets
22 May	"Irish Blood, English Heart"	Morrissey
29 May	"Irish Blood, English Heart"	Morrissey
5 June	"Mr. Brightside"	The Killers
12 June	"All Together Now 2004"	The Farm featuring S.F.X Boys Choir
19 June	"Come On England"	4-4-2 featuring Talksport Presenters
26 June	"Come On England"	4-4-2 featuring Talksport Presenters
3 July	"Come On England"	4-4-2 featuring Talksport Presenters
10 July	"Good Luck"	Basement Jaxx featuring Lisa Kekaula
17 July	"Good Luck"	Basement Jaxx featuring Lisa Kekaula
24 July	"First of the Gang to Die"	Morrissey
31 July	"First of the Gang to Die"	Morrissey
7 August	"1980"	Estelle
14 August	"The Sun Is Shining (Down on Me)"	DT8 Project
21 August	"Can't Stand Me Now"	The Libertines
28 August	"Put 'Em High"	StoneBridge featuring Therese
4 September	"Stand Up Tall"	Dizzie Rascal
11 September	"My My My"	Armand Van Helden
18 September	"My My My"	Armand Van Helden
25 September	"My My My"	Armand Van Helden
2 October	"Slash Dot Dash"	Fatboy Slim
9 October	"My My My"	Armand Van Helden
16 October	"Free"	Estelle
23 October	"Let Me Kiss You"	Morrissey
30 October	"Drop the Pressure"	Mylo
6 November	"What Became of the Likely Lads"	The Libertines
13 November	"Wind the Bobbin Up"	Jo Jingles
20 November	"Dream"	Dizzee Rascal
27 November	"Jolene (Live Under Blackpool Lights)"	The White Stripes
4 December	"Out of Touch"	Uniting Nations
11 December	"Killamangiro"	Babyshambles
18 December	"Out of Touch"	Uniting Nations
25 December	"I Have Forgiven Jesus"	Morrissey
1 January 2005	"Out of Touch"	Uniting Nations

== Notes ==
- ^{a} – The single was simultaneously number-one on the singles chart.

== See also ==
- 2004 in British music
