= Live at Earls Court =

Live album by Morrissey
- Released: 29 March 2005
- Recorded: 13–20 December 2004 in Scotland, England and Ireland
- Genre: Alternative rock
- Length: 74:11
- Label: Sanctuary
- Producer: Peter Asher

Morrissey chronology
| You Are the Quarry (2004) | Live at Earls Court (2005) | Ringleader of the Tormentors (2006) |

Singles from Live at Earls Court
- 1. "Redondo Beach"/"There Is a Light That Never Goes Out" Released: 28 March 2005

Professional ratings
Review scores
| Source | Rating |
|---|---|
| AllMusic | link |
| Kludge | 10/10 link |
| Pitchfork | 7.8/10 link |
| Rolling Stone | link |

Live at Earls Court is a live album by Morrissey, released in the US on 29 March 2005, and in Europe on 4 April 2005. Its sleeve notes state that it was "recorded live at Earls Court in London on 18 December 2004 in front of 17,183 people".

== Track listing ==
All tracks written by Morrissey and Alain Whyte except as noted.

1. "How Soon Is Now?" (Morrissey, Johnny Marr)
2. "First of the Gang to Die"
3. "November Spawned a Monster" (Morrissey, Clive Langer)
4. "Don't Make Fun of Daddy's Voice"
5. "Bigmouth Strikes Again" (Morrissey, Marr)
6. "I Like You" (Morrissey, Boz Boorer)
7. "Redondo Beach" (Patti Smith, Lenny Kaye, Richard Sohl)
8. "Let Me Kiss You"
9. "Subway Train – Munich Air Disaster 1958" medley (David Johansen, Johnny Thunders – Morrissey, Whyte)
10. "There Is a Light That Never Goes Out" (Morrissey, Marr)
11. "The More You Ignore Me, the Closer I Get" (Morrissey, Boorer)
12. "Friday Mourning"
13. "I Have Forgiven Jesus"
14. "The World Is Full of Crashing Bores" (Morrissey, Boorer)
15. "Shoplifters of the World Unite" (Morrissey, Marr)
16. "Irish Blood, English Heart"
17. "You Know I Couldn't Last" (Morrissey, Whyte, Gary Day)
18. "Last Night I Dreamt That Somebody Loved Me" (Morrissey, Marr)

== Singles ==
One single was released from the album:

1. "Redondo Beach"/"There Is a Light That Never Goes Out" double A-side

B-sides: "Noise Is the Best Revenge", "It's Hard to Walk Tall When You're Small" (BBC Session)

It was released on 28 March 2005 in Europe and on 5 April in the United States. In the United Kingdom, the single reached number 11 in the Top 40. In Europe the single preceded the album, whereas in the United States the roles were reversed.

== Personnel ==
- Morrissey – vocals
- Boz Boorer – guitar, congas, clarinet, backing vocals
- Jesse Tobias – guitar
- Michael Farrell – keyboards, percussion, trumpet, backing vocals
- Gary Day – bass
- Dean Butterworth – drums
