= I Have Forgiven Jesus =

2004 single by Morrissey

Single by Morrissey

from the album You Are the Quarry
- B-side: "No One Can Hold a Candle to You"; "The Slum Mums"; "The Public Image"
- Released: 13 December 2004
- Recorded: Los Angeles, 2004
- Genre: Alternative rock
- Length: 3:41
- Label: Attack, Sanctuary
- Songwriters: Morrissey; Alain Whyte
- Producer: Jerry Finn

Morrissey singles chronology
"Let Me Kiss You" (2004)	"I Have Forgiven Jesus" (2004)	"There Is a Light That Never Goes Out" (live)/ "Redondo Beach" (2005)

"I Have Forgiven Jesus" is an alternative rock song from English singer Morrissey's 2004 album You Are the Quarry. It was co-written by Morrissey and his band member Alain Whyte, and produced by Jerry Finn. The track reflects the singer's upbringing in an Irish Catholic community and his status as a lapsed Catholic. The song is a ballad that tells the story of a child who becomes disillusioned with religion because of his inability to deal with his own desires. The title refers to the character's blame and subsequent forgiveness of Jesus Christ for creating him as a lovely creature that has no chance to express its love. Described as both confessional and humorous, the song has been interpreted as a blasphemous critique of organized religion and an ambivalent way for Morrissey to describe his own religiosity.

The song was released in December 2004 as the fourth single from You Are the Quarry; its release was preceded in November 2004 by that of a music video in which Morrissey performs the role of a priest. This performance increased the controversy around the track, which received polarized reviews; some critics described it as a "woeful" release and others classified it among the best songs of both the album and of the singer's career. Despite not being playlisted by BBC Radio 1, one of the United Kingdom's most popular radio stations, the single reached number 10 on the UK Singles Chart and topped the UK Independent Singles Chart. It made the track his fourth top-ten hit of the year, something he had never achieved before. The song remained significant in Morrissey's career, being included on his 2004, 2006 and 2014 tours.

== Background and release ==
Morrissey was raised in a Catholic family and that inspired "I Have Forgiven Jesus". He disliked his upbringing, having described himself in 1989 as "a seriously lapsed Catholic ... after being forced to go to church and never understanding why and never enjoying it, seeing so many negative things, and realising it somehow wasn't for [him]". In late 2004, prior to the release of the song, he appeared at a Halloween concert and on television dressed as a priest. He would later use the same costume on the music video.

"I Have Forgiven Jesus" first appeared as a track on the album You Are the Quarry, which was produced by Jerry Finn and released in May 2004, seven years after his last solo album Maladjusted. It was later released as the fourth and final single from the album by Sanctuary Records' imprint Attack Records on 13 December 2004 in a 7-inch vinyl format that was backed with "No One Can Hold a Candle to You", a cover of a song originally recorded by his friend James Maker's band Raymonde, as a B-side. Attack also released two CD versions on the same date; the first, a mini CD, contained the same tracks, while the second, a maxi CD, contained two different B-sides; "The Slum Mums" and "The Public Image". The former song was co-composed by Boz Boorer and then bassist Gary Day. Attack and Sanctuary re-released the first CD edition on 22 February 2005. A remastered version of "I Have Forgiven" was later included on Morrissey's compilation album Greatest Hits (2008).

== Composition and lyrics ==
"I Have Forgiven Jesus", which was co-written by Morrissey and his band member Alain Whyte, is an alternative rock ballad with R&B and pop rock undertones. It is composed in the key A minor and Morrissey's vocal ranges from the note A_{3} to G_{5}. Morrissey also sings in the falsetto register and his voice is accompanied by an electric piano. The song describes a person who blames Jesus Christ for creating a human full of love and desires but who is unable to transmit it, although forgives the divine figure for doing so. It features confessional lyrics mixed with a "darkly comedic" tone and elements of black humour that discuss frustrated sexual desire and Catholic guilt. The song was described as representing Morrissey's "angst", especially for "being born mortal", in the form of a "self-pity", "self-loathing", and "anguish-filled lament". An "archetypal self-flagellating Morrissey lyric", in the words of Fiona Shepherd of The Scotsman, it shows how the singer "embraces hopelessness". Kitty Empire of The Observer said it expresses his agony and "that, poignant in his younger self, seems more troubling in a man in his forties". Telegram & Gazette's Craig Semon said it is a lament on "his sorrowful existence and how his life has been plagued with nothing but heartache". Nicholas P. Greco of Providence College wrote that despite attributing to Jesus the blame for making him the way he is, the song deals mainly with one's inability to convey one's own desires. Although it could be interpreted merely as Morrissey's "narcissism" to think he is in a superior position to forgive Christ, Greco found it to be a "serious lament" that people can relate to. This latter perception was echoed by Spin's Annie Zaleski and Jason Anderson, who described it as a lament "about the curse of having so much love to express 'in a loveless world'", and Lisa de Jong of Utrecht University, who characterised it as a song aimed at comforting the "misfits". Adrian May of P. N. Review described it as "about what to do with the abandonment of desire, how to forgive and transcend to a greater truth or good"; this truth, said May, is the search for a new identity.

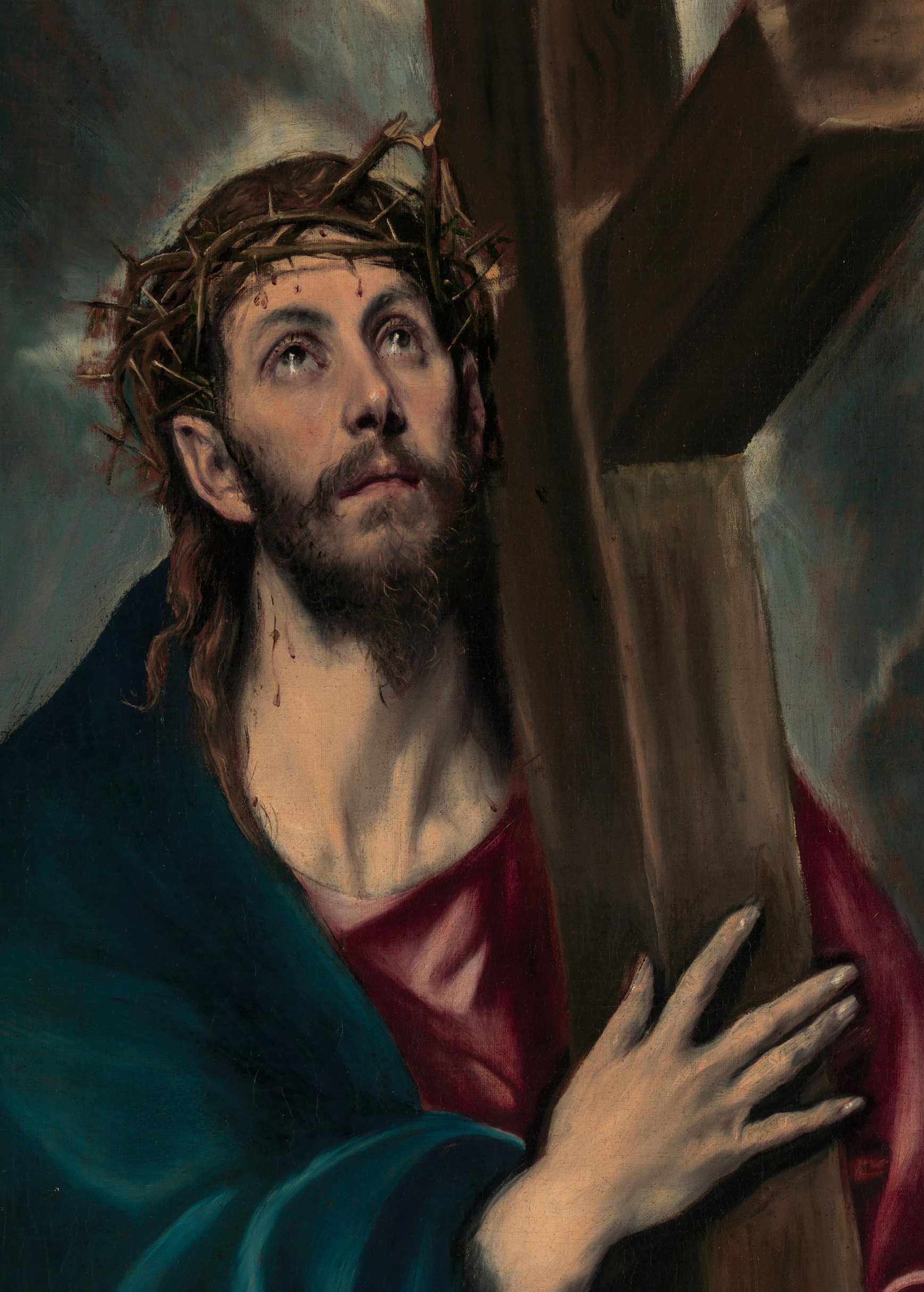
El Greco's 1580 painting of Christ on his way to Calvary

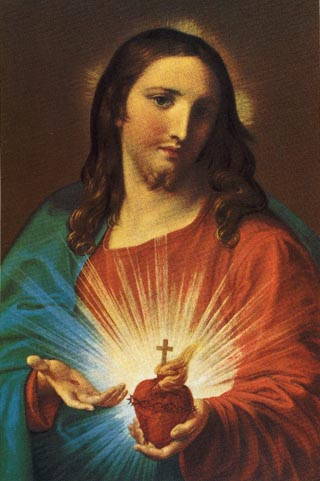
Pompeo Batoni's 1767 painting of the Sacred Heart of Jesus

Both of these religious elements were said to have been featured throughout "I Have Forgiven Jesus" lyrics

The song starts by establishing the title character as "a good kid" who "would do no harm", while a middle-height vocal is accompanied by a "1960s-sounding, almost Beatle-esque keyboard", in the words of academic Isabella van Elferen. As the drama rises and the child starts to doubt the values taught to him, the andante tempo that expressed the "safety provided by uncontested religious truths" changes to high-pitched vocals that symbolise "naiveté [being] replaced by [the] despair ... of being deserted by those same truths". Gavin Hopps, author of the biography Morrissey: The Pageant of His Bleeding Heart, wrote that the song uses a humorous tone to describe this loss of faith when Morrissey uses "the dozy-schoolboy nonstandard 'brung'" in the verse "Forgive me any pain I may have brung to you" and when he "ironically repeat[s] back to Christ the promises he feels have been broken or seem meaningless ('I'll always be near to you')". Biographer David Bret commented that Morrissey described how "as a dutiful Catholic boy he withstood humiliation and condescension to attend church" in the verse "Through hail and snow, I'd go just to moon you". In the sequence, Morrissey sings "I carried my heart in my hand", which, Hopps suggested, could be an allusion to the Sacred Heart.

The third verse, in low-pitched sequences, describes a suffering routine from Monday to Friday. Both Hopps and de Jong interpreted it as emulating the pain Christ is said to have suffered on his way to Calvary. Morrissey concludes this part with "By Friday life has killed me", which Hopps said could be an allusion to Good Friday. The death in this part, argued May, is a symbolic one that indicates a self-exile from previous beliefs and the search for a new identity. The Guardian's Ben Hewitt described it as a secular experience of a week of "joyless, sexless activity". This sequence was meant to express "the dull drone of emptied-out daily life without love, or God", wrote van Elferen. In this part, the character is still haunted by the recent abandonment of his beliefs. The song then transitions to "a melancholy cello melody" as the calm tone becomes agitated and the singer asks why he has been given "so much love in a loveless world". The singer's tone gradually thickens until it reaches a point of a "stubborn repetition of a despairing call to Jesus ('Do you hate me?')" underlined by a strong on-beat drum with subtle, syncopated keyboard motifs. After this "urgent existential complaint" in which, wrote Hopps, "feeling that God must have hated him in creating him, he suffers so much from being himself", the beat stops abruptly as the song ends.

=== Relation to religion ===
The song's main character, according to Zaleski and Anderson, can be that "Irish Catholic boy in Manchester" who, according to the song, is "a nice kid" who does not know how to handle his desires. Brontë Schiltz of Manchester Metropolitan University said this inability is correlated to Morrissey's discomfort with his queer identity during his Catholic upbringing. Because of this link between desire and religion, some journalists, including Rolling Stone's James Hunter and The Advocate's David White, understood the song as a critique of organized religion. Mikel Jollett, on the program All Things Considered, described it as a "confessional accusation of Christianity". Jim Abbott, writing for the Orlando Sentinel, said Morrissey blames faith for his feelings. Hua Hsu of Slate, however, stated that it "finds Morrissey at peace with his spiritual non-relationships rather than flailing helplessly against the torture of religious upbringing". Van Elferen said the song depicts a more "ambiguous relation" of Morrissey to his religious background.

Because of the way the song inverts the divine-human relations, both academics and journalists have described it as "blasphemy" and "blasphemous". According to Hopps, beyond the "appearance of blasphemy", it featured elements reminiscent of the lamentations and accusations in the Old Testament of God being unjust, especially those found in the Book of Job. Hopps said, however, that at the same time it "seems to be making fun of religious teaching in a way the psalmists and Job do not". The author concluded that Catholic faith is "the light that never goes out" on Morrissey's life because the song mixes an "apparently blasphemous bitterness" with "what seems to be an unironic sense of dereliction ('but Jesus hurt me / when He deserted me'), which implies a prior and latent state of relation". An anonymous author of the Centre for Christian Apologetics, Scholarship and Education of the New College, University of New South Wales also described the song as being both "blasphemous, and offensive to Christian sensibilities" and "a meditation on desire". Although the writer ultimately condemned it, he said it could be positively interpreted as "a prayer of complaint, directed to Jesus" similar to the Psalmists' appeal to God.

Scholar Anti Nylén wrote that Morrissey's songs usually feature "Christian imagery" but from an "incredulous" position, considering that "I Have Forgiven Jesus" is an exception to this. He stated that "'prayer' and 'blasphemy' are present in the song at the same time" and that it is "a song about reconciliation ... by a Christian who has faith but who still has enormous difficulties in submitting to [it]". The entwinement of prayer and blasphemy is characteristic of the anti-modern tradition of Catholic Romanticism, into which Nylén puts Morrissey. Van Elferen interpreted Morrissey's position regarding Catholicism as akin to that of Gothic fiction, which, like Romanticism, sought "to reconstruct the divine mysteries that reason had begun to dismantle". Both Gothic literature and the song, van Elferen wrote, ponder "what remains when the comfort of religious truth disappears in its shadow, returning like the uncanny of the Freudian repressed, haunting one with relentless questionings".

=== Relation to Morrissey discography ===
Scholars and critics have debated the connections of "I Have Forgiven Jesus" to Morrissey's general œuvre. Macquarie University's Jean-Philippe Deranty traced back its themes of "painful sexual failure" that issues "a traumatic confusion about sexual preferences and sexual abilities" to The Smiths's song "I Want the One I Can't Have" from the 1985 album Meat Is Murder. Scholar Daniel Manco argued that "I Have Forgiven Jesus" is thematically related to Morrissey's 1990 song "November Spawned a Monster", both of which feature disabled people and dialogues with Jesus. Manco also commented that it echoes "November Spawned a Monster" in its discussion of "blameless youth, dysfunctional corporeality, social and sexual abjection, and divine culpability". De Jong compared it with You Are the Quarry's "Let Me Kiss You" (2004); she wrote that both songs approach love in a "grim way" and highlight themes of "physical uncertainties". Because of its references to Morrissey's Anglo-Irish upbringing and the way the song cast doubts on the values he learnt, van Elferen called it the "religious counterpart" of "Irish Blood, English Heart" (2004). Eric Schumacher-Rasmussen of Paste went further, writing that it "summed up ... the raison d'etre of his entire career".

== Critical reception ==
Upon its release, "I Have Forgiven Jesus" was described as a controversial track and has polarized critics. Josh Tyrangiel of Time called it "woeful", Alexis Petridis of The Guardian criticized it for its "cheap synthesised strings", and Andrew Stevens of 3:AM Magazine said it is "flat and go[es] nowhere". Ben Rayner of Toronto Star called it "ridiculously overwrought, even by Morrissey's theatrical standards". People staff dubbed it "bloody brilliant" and The Scotsman labelled it a "touching song about repressed desire". Telegram & Gazette's Semon wrote, "In the age of 'The Passion of the Christ' and the religious right seemingly having more influence on the political might, writing a song such as 'I've Forgiven Jesus' is a bold move to say the least"; he also praised "Morrissey's emotionally stirring falsetto" who "send shivers down one's spine".

It was considered to be one of the best tracks on You Are the Quarry along with "Irish Blood, English Heart" by Rolling Stone's Jonathan Ringen, by SFGate's Aidin Vaziri, and by Jordan Kessler of PopMatters, who paired it with "First of the Gang to Die". By the start of 2005, BBC Manchester's Terry Christian included the song at number 25 among the 40 best songs of 2004. In retrospective analyses, "I Have Forgiven Jesus" has been featured as one of Morrissey's best songs by Chile's Radio Cooperativa in 2013, The Guardian's Hewitt in 2014, and Spin's Zaleski and Anderson in 2017. While Hewitt described it as a "swirling, grandiose pop", Zaleski and Anderson remarked on its "poignancy".

== Chart performance ==
Although BBC Radio 1 refused to playlist "I Have Forgiven", the song debuted at number 10 on the UK Singles Chart issue dated 25 December 2004. This marked Morrissey's fourth straight-to-the-top-10 single of the year, following "Irish Blood, English Heart", "First of the Gang to Die" and "Let Me Kiss You". These four top 10 hits were achieved within seven months – a record in his career. It spent five consecutive weeks on the chart between 13 December 2004 and 22 January 2005, declining each week before leaving the Top 100. It topped the UK Independent Singles Chart (UK Indie) on its debut and spent seven consecutive weeks on the chart. In spite of reaching the top 10 in UK, Morrissey had not the chance to appear on the BBC program Top of the Pops. On the Irish Singles Chart, it only spent a week in the top 50, peaking at number 45. Its only chart performance outside its domestic market was in Sweden, where it entered the national chart at number 33 and spent six consecutive weeks on the chart.

== Music video ==
The music video for "I Have Forgiven Jesus", which was directed by Bucky Fukumoto via The Directors Bureau, was released online in November 2004. Its images were later used on the covers of the song's single release. The video was later released as bonus material on Morrissey's 2005 live DVD Who Put the M in Manchester?. In the video, Morrissey is dressed as a Roman Catholic priest in a white clerical collar and black blazer and pants, while carrying rosaries and wearing a crucifix. It opens with a close-up of Morrissey, which is followed by a shot of the grey sky and a long shot of him walking towards the camera. The sepia-toned image shows the singer walking down the grey, deserted streets in a broken-down Los Angeles park. First alone, Morrissey is joined by the band members, who wear Jobriath's T-shirts during the walk.

Morrissey's decision to take the role of a priest in the music video was controversial. It was interpreted by James G. Crossley of the Department of Biblical Studies of the University of Sheffield as a desire to express "personal angst" and to have an "ironical and humorous take" on it. Hewitt said the singer's clothing in the video and the December release as a Christmas single were clear evidence that Morrissey planned it as a "jocular provocation". Van Elferen said the video expresses his ambivalent relationship with Catholicism as he "presents himself as his own spectre" through the depiction of someone tormented by "his own flesh and bone, [and] painfully aware of the contradictions between prescribed Catholic dealings with issues of sexuality and his own feelings". Nylén said the choice of the band members' T-shirts may be an argument because Jobriath was an openly gay rock star while Catholicism usually condemns homosexuality.

== Live performances ==
Morrissey performed "I Have Forgiven Jesus" live as part of his 2004 tour of the UK and the US; some parts of this tour are featured on his album Live at Earls Court (2004) and DVD Who Put the M in Manchester? (2005), both of which include "I Have Forgiven Jesus". In July 2004, he performed it live on The Late Late Show with Craig Kilborn and this performance would later be included on a deluxe re-release of You Are the Quarry in December 2004. It was also included on the 2006 tour for his following album Ringleader of the Tormentors, and on the 2014 tour for the album World Peace Is None of Your Business.

== Formats and track listings ==
- 7-inch vinyl and CD 1
1. "I Have Forgiven Jesus"
2. "No One Can Hold a Candle to You"
- CD 2
1. "I Have Forgiven Jesus"
2. "The Slum Mums"
3. "The Public Image"

== Personnel ==
Personnel are adapted from the liner notes of "I Have Forgiven Jesus" single.

- Morrissey – songwriting
- Alain Whyte – songwriting, guitar
- Jerry Finn – production
- Joe McGrath – engineering
- Boz Boorer – guitar
- Gary Day – bass
- Dean Butterworth – drums
- Roger Manning – keyboards

== Charts ==
Weekly chart performance for "I Have Forgiven Jesus"
Chart (2004–2005)	Peak position
Ireland (IRMA)	45
Sweden (Sverigetopplistan)	33
UK Singles (OCC)	10
UK Indie (OCC)	1
