= Off 2 Work =

Single by Dizzee Rascal
- A-side: "Graftin'"
- Released: 21 March 2005
- Recorded: 2004
- Genre: Grime
- Length: 2:37
- Label: XL
- Songwriter: Dylan Mills
- Producer: Dizzee Rascal

Dizzee Rascal singles chronology
"Dream" (2004)	"Off 2 Work" / "Graftin'" (2005)	"Sirens" (2007)

"Off 2 Work" is a song by British rapper Dizzee Rascal. It was released on 21 March 2005 by XL Recordings as a double A-side single along with "Graftin'", from his second studio album Showtime (2004). Unlike the latter, "Off 2 Work" was a brand-new, previously unreleased track that was not included on Showtime or any of Dizzee Rascal's main studio albums and was a standalone single release. It performed moderately on the UK Singles Chart, peaking at number 44.

== Background ==
"Off 2 Work" was a new, previously unreleased song from Dizzee Rascal that was completely absent from his second studio album Showtime (2004). It only appeared as one side of a double A-side single alongside the track "Graftin'" (which appeared as track 4 on Showtime) upon its release in March 2005. The single release was also packaged with an additional remix of "Off 2 Work" produced by Dizzee's manager Nick "Cage" Detnon.

In a June 2005 interview with Pitchfork, Dizzee said of the track: "I just wanted to put out something different. I know the beat is kinda awkward for some people, but I wanted to go that step further again."

== Commercial performance ==
"Off 2 Work"/"Graftin'" performed moderately in the charts and was Dizzee Rascal's least successful and lowest-charting single up until that point, debuting at number 44 on the UK Singles Chart on 2 April 2005. This made it Dizzee's first single to miss the top 40 in the United Kingdom after all six of his previous ones had comfortably broken into there, including his guest feature on Basement Jaxx's 2003 single "Lucky Star", which was also a top 40 hit in the UK. Additionally, it would only spend two weeks in the top 75 before dropping out of the chart entirely. The single also reached number 13 on the UK Hip Hop and R&B Singles Chart and number 7 on the UK Independent Singles Chart.

== Music video ==
The accompanying music video for "Off 2 Work" was directed by Goetz Werner and features Dizzee Rascal in various ordinary workplace situations such as a traffic warden, a fast food vendor, a businessman, and as the Prime Minister, announcing his satirical engagement to Cherie Blair. Werner also directed the music video for "Graftin'", and the 2007 documentary Bow Selector that aired on Channel 4 to promote Dizzee's third studio album Maths + English (2007).

== Track listing ==
Digital download

1. "Off 2 Work" – 2:37
2. "Graftin'" – 3:25
3. "Off 2 Work" (Remix) – 3:36

UK CD1

1. "Off 2 Work" – 2:37
2. "Graftin'" – 3:25

UK CD2

1. "Off 2 Work" – 2:37
2. "Off 2 Work" (Remix) – 3:39
3. "Graftin'" (video) – 3:26

UK 12-inch vinyl

1. "Off 2 Work" – 2:37
2. "Off 2 Work" (instrumental) – 2:37
3. "Off 2 Work" (Remix) – 3:39
4. "Off 2 Work" (Remix) (instrumental) – 3:39

== Charts ==
Weekly chart performance for "Off 2 Work"
Chart (2005)	Peak position
Scottish Singles Sales (Official Charts) With "Graftin'"	84
UK Singles (Official Charts) With "Graftin'"	44
UK Hip Hop/R&B (Official Charts) With "Graftin'"	13
UK Indie (Official Charts) With "Graftin'"	7

== Release history ==
Release dates and formats for "Off 2 Work"
Region	Date	Format(s)	Label(s)	Ref.
United Kingdom	21 March 2005	12-inch vinyl; CD; maxi CD	XL	
United Kingdom	21 March 2005	Digital download	XL	
