= Sirens (Dizzee Rascal song) =

Single by Dizzee Rascal

from the album Maths + English
- Released: 21 May 2007
- Recorded: 2006
- Genre: Hip-hop; nu metal
- Length: 3:20
- Label: XL
- Songwriters: Dylan Mills; Cage; Reginald Arvizu; Jonathan Davis; James Shaffer; David Silveria; Brian Welch
- Producer: Cage

Dizzee Rascal singles chronology
"Off 2 Work" / "Graftin'" (2005)	"Sirens" (2007)	"Pussyole (Old Skool)" (2007)

"Sirens" is the seventh single release from British rapper Dizzee Rascal, and the lead single from his third studio album Maths + English.

The single was playlisted on BBC Radio 1's 1-Upfront list and the music video for the single made the top thirty of that chart. Despite mediocre amounts of airplay on both television and radio, the single was a success for Dizzee Rascal, returning him to the top twenty of the UK singles chart after previous single "Off 2 Work" / "Graftin'" was his first to miss the top forty. The song became his fourth top twenty hit and was his first single to be released on 7" vinyl.

This song features a sample from the song "Here to Stay" by Korn.

Jorja Smith samples the chorus in her song "Blue Lights".

== Track listing ==
CD

1. "Sirens"
2. "Dean"

7" vinyl

1. "Sirens"
2. "Like Me"

12" vinyl

1. "Sirens"
2. "Sirens" (a cappella)
3. "Sirens" (Chase & Status remix)
4. "Sirens" (Chase & Status remix instrumental)

== Music video ==
The video premiered in 2007. It shows him being chased by foxhunters on horses chasing him through his house, then onto the streets and towards the end of the video, he is trapped down an alleyway and is seemingly killed, and his blood is smeared on the hunters' faces. This suggests that Dizzee is effectively game for the toffs, where 'game' represents the lower classes, deliberately held down by the rich, while the police are just one of the riches tools to do so.

== Charts ==
Chart (2007)	Peak position
UK Singles (Official Charts)	20
UK Dance (Official Charts)	1
