= You Are the Quarry =

Studio album by Morrissey
- Released: 17 May 2004
- Recorded: Autumn 2003
- Studios: Hook End Manor, Oxfordshire, England; Conway, Hollywood, California
- Genres: Alternative rock; pop rock; indie rock
- Length: 47:20
- Label: Sanctuary/Attack
- Producer: Jerry Finn

Morrissey chronology
The Best of Morrissey (2001)	You Are the Quarry (2004)	Live at Earls Court (2005)

Singles from You Are the Quarry
- 1. "Irish Blood, English Heart" Released: 12 April 2004; 2. "First of the Gang to Die" Released: 12 July 2004; 3. "Let Me Kiss You" Released: 11 October 2004; 4. "I Have Forgiven Jesus" Released: 13 December 2004

You Are the Quarry is the seventh solo studio album by English singer-songwriter Morrissey. It was released on 17 May 2004 by record label Attack, and was his first album in seven years following 1997's Maladjusted. The album was a huge comeback for Morrissey; all four of its singles reached the top 10 on the UK Singles Chart, and the album itself reached number 2. The album also reached number 11 on the Billboard 200, making it Morrissey's highest-charting album in the United States.

== Reception ==
Professional ratings
Aggregate scores
Source	Rating
Metacritic	72/100
Review scores
Source	Rating
AllMusic	4/5 stars
Entertainment Weekly	A
The Guardian	2/5 stars
Los Angeles Times	3/4 stars
Mojo	4/5 stars
NME	8/10
Pitchfork	8.9/10
Q	2/5 stars
Rolling Stone	3.5/5 stars
Uncut	3/5 stars

According to critic review aggregator Metacritic, the album received an average review score of 72/100, based on 31 critical reviews, indicating "Generally favorable reviews".

== Release ==
The first single released to promote the album was "Irish Blood, English Heart", released on 10 May 2004. You Are the Quarry was released on 17 May 2004 by record label Attack. The album charted at number 2 in the UK.

Some versions of the packaging do not show the full frame on the cover, but only a crop of Morrissey's face, cropping out the machine gun.

Nancy Sinatra recorded a version of "Let Me Kiss You", which was released as a single which performed well on the UK Singles Chart, prior to Morrissey's own single release of the song.

In October 2004, Attack repackaged and reissued You Are the Quarry as a two-disc deluxe edition. The second disc collected the nine B-sides from the album's first three singles, as well as music videos and live TV performances from the record, including Morrissey's live performances on American TV show The Late Late Show with Craig Kilborn. The original album is available with the bonus DVD, featuring the "Irish Blood, English Heart" video, song lyrics and a photo gallery.

== 20th anniversary concerts ==
Morrissey was set to perform the album in its entirety at two concerts in Southern California to celebrate its 20th anniversary. The concerts were scheduled for 26 January 2024 at the Honda Center in Anaheim, and 27 January 2024 at the Kia Forum in Los Angeles. The shows were ultimately cancelled when Morrissey was ordered to remain in Zurich, Switzerland while suffering from physical exhaustion.

== Track listing ==
All tracks are written by Morrissey and Alain Whyte, except where noted.

No.	Title	Writer(s)	Length
1.	"America Is Not the World"		4:03
2.	"Irish Blood, English Heart"		2:37
3.	"I Have Forgiven Jesus"		3:41
4.	"Come Back to Camden"	Morrissey; Boz Boorer	4:14
5.	"I'm Not Sorry"	Morrissey; Boorer	4:41
6.	"The World Is Full of Crashing Bores"	Morrissey; Boorer	3:51
7.	"How Can Anybody Possibly Know How I Feel?"		3:25
8.	"First of the Gang to Die"		3:38
9.	"Let Me Kiss You"		3:30
10.	"All the Lazy Dykes"		3:31
11.	"I Like You"	Morrissey; Boorer	4:11
12.	"You Know I Couldn't Last"	Morrissey; Whyte; Gary Day	5:51

Deluxe Edition bonus disc
No.	Title	Writer(s)	Length
1.	"Don't Make Fun of Daddy's Voice"		2:53
2.	"It's Hard to Walk Tall When You're Small"		3:32
3.	"Teenage Dad on His Estate"		4:08
4.	"Munich Air Disaster 1958" ( (Note: referring to the Munich air disaster))		2:30
5.	"Friday Mourning"		4:08
6.	"The Never-Played Symphonies"		3:03
7.	"My Life Is a Succession of People Saying Goodbye"		2:55
8.	"I Am Two People"		3:55
9.	"Mexico"	Morrissey; Whyte; Day	4:06

Deluxe Edition bonus disc: video / live TV

- "Irish Blood, English Heart" (promotional video)
- "First of the Gang to Die" (from The Late Late Show, 22 July 2004)
- "I Have Forgiven Jesus" (from The Late Late Show, 23 July 2004)
- "Let Me Kiss You" (from The Late Late Show, 24 August 2004)

== Personnel ==
- Morrissey – vocals
- Alain Whyte – guitar, backing vocals
- Boz Boorer – guitar
- Gary Day – bass guitar
- Dean Butterworth – drums
- Spike T. Smith – drums
- Roger Manning – keyboards
- Rhys Williams - flute
- Jerry Finn – production

== Charts ==
Chart performance for You Are the Quarry
Chart (2004)	Peak position
Australian Albums (ARIA)	64
Austrian Albums (Ö3 Austria)	24
Belgian Albums (Ultratop Flanders)	14
Belgian Albums (Ultratop Wallonia)	32
Danish Albums (Hitlisten)	13
Dutch Albums (Album Top 100)	30
Finnish Albums (Suomen virallinen lista)	8
French Albums (SNEP)	21
German Albums (Offizielle Top 100)	7
Irish Albums (IRMA)	3
Italian Albums (FIMI)	32
Norwegian Albums (VG-lista)	5
Portuguese Albums (AFP)	10
Swedish Albums (Sverigetopplistan)	1
Swiss Albums (Schweizer Hitparade)	63
UK Albums (Official Charts)	2
US Billboard 200	11

== Certifications and sales ==
Certifications and sales for You Are the Quarry
Region	Certification	Certified units/sales
United Kingdom (BPI)	Platinum	300,000^{^}
Summaries
Worldwide	—N/a	1,000,000
^{^} Shipments figures based on certification alone.
