= Ghostbird =

Studio album by Zee Avi
- Released: August 23, 2011
- Genres: Indie, Alternative, Jazz, Rock
- Label: Brushfire Records/Monotone/Universal Republic Records

Zee Avi chronology
Zee Avi (2009)	Ghostbird (2011)

Singles from Ghostbird
- 1. "The Book of Morris Johnson" Released: June 28, 2011

Professional ratings
Review scores
Source	Rating
Allmusic	3.5/5 stars

Ghostbird is the second album from singer Zee Avi. The album's first single "The Book of Morris Johnson" was released on iTunes on 28 June 2011.

== Track listing ==
All tracks are written by Zee Avi, except where noted.

No.	Title	Length
1.	"Swell Window"	3:52
2.	"Anchor"	3:23
3.	"31 Days"	3:53
4.	"Milestone Moon"	3:40
5.	"Siboh Kitak Nangis"	2:20
6.	"The Book of Morris Johnson" (Avi, Morris Johnson, Rex Taylor)	3:15
7.	"Madness"	2:28
8.	"Bag of Gold"	2:39
9.	"Concrete Wall"	3:35
10.	"Roll Your Head In the Sun"	2:55
11.	"Stay In the Clouds"	3:30
12.	"Swell Window (Live from the Solar Powered Plastic Plant)"	4:16
Total length:		39:55

== Chart performance ==
Chart (2011)	Peak position
US Billboard 200	129
US Billboard Alternative Albums	20
US Billboard Rock Albums	32
US Billboard Heatseekers	1
