= Redondo Beach (song) =

1975 song by Patti Smith

Song by Patti Smith

from the album Horses
- Released: December 13, 1975
- Recorded: 1975
- Genre: Reggae; punk rock
- Length: 3:26
- Label: Arista
- Songwriters: Patti Smith; Richard Sohl; Lenny Kaye
- Producer: John Cale

Horses track listing
- 8 tracks Side one: 1. "Gloria: In Excelsis Deo / Gloria"; 2. "Redondo Beach"; 3. "Birdland"; 4. "Free Money"; Disc two: 1. "Kimberly"; 2. "Break It Up"; 3. "Land: Horses / Land of a Thousand Dances / La Mer (De)"; 4. "Elegie"

"Redondo Beach" is a song by Patti Smith. It was first released on Smith's 1975 album Horses, with band members Richard Sohl and Lenny Kaye credited as co-writers. The lyrics were originally published as a poem in Smith's 1972 book kodak under the title "Radando Beach".

== Song ==
The lyrics relate the suicide by drowning of a young woman following an argument with the song's narrator. It has frequently been interpreted as a lesbian-themed song; Smith appeared to encourage this interpretation in her live performances, often introducing the song with "Redondo Beach is a beach where women love other women".

She later said that she wrote the lyrics in 1971 following a fight with her sister Linda; Linda had disappeared for the day, causing Patti to worry that she had come to harm. Smith also stated that she considers herself "beyond gender" in her artistic expression. Smith's lyrics were set to a reggae arrangement.

== Usage ==
The song featured in the 2023 film Perfect Days.

== Morrissey version ==
"Redondo Beach" (live)

Single by Morrissey

from the album Live at Earls Court
- A-side: "There Is a Light That Never Goes Out" (live)
- Released: March 28, 2005
- Recorded: December 18, 2004
- Venue: Earls Court, London
- Genre: Alternative rock
- Length: 4:03
- Label: Attack
- Songwriters: Patti Smith; Richard Sohl; Lenny Kaye
- Producer: Peter Asher

Morrissey singles chronology
"I Have Forgiven Jesus" (2004)	"There Is a Light That Never Goes Out" (live) / "Redondo Beach" (2005)	"You Have Killed Me" (2006)

The song was part of Morrissey's live set list throughout his December 2004 arena tour. "Redondo Beach / There Is a Light That Never Goes Out" was a double A-side single released by Morrissey to promote his live album Live at Earls Court in 2005. The double A-side reached number 11 in the United Kingdom, and "Redondo Beach" reached number 33 in Sweden.

=== Track listings ===
7" vinyl

1. "Redondo Beach" (live) (Patti Smith, Richard Sohl, Lenny Kaye) – 4:07
2. "There Is a Light That Never Goes Out" (live) (Johnny Marr, Morrissey) – 4:50

CD single

1. "There Is a Light That Never Goes Out" (live) (Johnny Marr, Morrissey) - 4:50
2. "Redondo Beach" (live) (Patti Smith, Richard Sohl, Lenny Kaye) – 4:07
3. "Noise Is the Best Revenge" (Janice Long session 2004) (Morrissey, Boz Boorer) - 4:03

DVD single

1. "Redondo Beach" (live) (Patti Smith, Richard Sohl, Lenny Kaye) – 4:07
2. "There Is a Light That Never Goes Out" (live) (Johnny Marr, Morrissey) – 4:50
3. "It's Hard to Walk Tall When You're Small" (Janice Long session 2004) (Morrissey, Alain Whyte)
4. "There Is a Light That Never Goes Out" (live promotional video)
5. "There Is a Light That Never Goes Out" (video taken from Manchester Evening News Arena)

=== Charts ===
Chart (2005)	Position
Europe (Eurochart Hot 100 Singles)	41
Ireland (IRMA)	45
Scotland Singles (Official Charts) with "There Is a Light That Never Goes Out"	15
Sweden (Sverigetopplistan)	33
UK Singles (Official Charts) with "There Is a Light That Never Goes Out"	11
UK Indie (Official Charts) with "There Is a Light That Never Goes Out"	1
US Hot 100 Singles Sales (Billboard)	10

=== Release history ===
Region	Date	Label	Format	Catalog
UK	2005	Attack Records	7" vinyl	ATKSE011
UK	2005	Attack Records	CD #1	ATKXS011
UK	2005	Attack Records	CD #2	ATKXD011

== Other cover versions ==
The song was performed by Angel Corpus Christi on I Love NY, her 1984 album of cover versions that were originally recorded by New York-based artists.
