= Zee Avi (album) =

Studio album by Zee Avi
- Released: 19 May 2009
- Genres: Indie, pop, jazz
- Labels: Brushfire Records, Monotone Records

Zee Avi chronology
Zee Avi (2009)	Ghostbird (2011)

Professional ratings
Review scores
Source	Rating
AllMusic	3.5/5
Entertainment Weekly	B+
Paste	85/100
PopMatters	8/10
The New York Times	Favourable
Under the Radar	7/10

Zee Avi is the debut album from singer Zee Avi. The album is most notable for Avi's single "Bitter Heart".

== Chart history ==
Zee Avi peaked at number 130 on the US Billboard 200 albums chart and number 2 on the Billboard Heatseekers chart in 2009. The album sold 6,000 copies in the United States in its first two weeks of release according to Nielsen SoundScan. The debut single "Bitter Heart" entered the Billboard Japan Hot 100 singles chart at number 82 and peaked at number 63 for two weeks. To date, the album has sold over 300,000 units and been certified Gold in Taiwan, Singapore and Malaysia.

The Associated Press named Zee Avi one of the top 10 albums of 2009, taking the No. 9 spot.

== Track listing ==
All tracks are written by Zee Avi, except "First of the Gang to Die" by Morrissey and Alain Whyte.

No.	Title	Length
1.	"Bitter Heart"	2:37
2.	"Poppy"	3:09
3.	"Honey Bee"	3:08
4.	"Just You and Me"	2:57
5.	"Is This the End"	3:50
6.	"Monte" (Bam)	3:33
7.	"Kantoi"	1:46
8.	"I Am Me Once More"	2:37
9.	"First of the Gang to Die" (Morrissey cover)	3:57
10.	"Darlin' It Ain't Easy"	2:44
11.	"The Story"	2:53
12.	"Let Me In"	4:25
