= Kodak (poetry collection) =

Book by Patti Smith

kodak
- Author: Patti Smith
- Cover artist: Robert Mapplethorpe
- Language: English
- Genre: Poetry
- Publisher: Middle Earth
- Publication date: 1972
- Publication place: United States
- Media type: Board book
- Pages: 17

kodak is a poetry collection by Patti Smith, published in 1972.

== Contents ==
1. Untitled
2. "k.o.d.a.k."
3. "Star Fever"
4. Untitled ("Renee Falconetti")
5. Untitled ("Georgia O'Keeffe")
6. "Radando Beach"
7. "Conch"
8. Untitled ("Prayer")
9. "Balance"
