= Showtime (Dizzee Rascal album) =

Studio album by Dizzee Rascal
- Released: 6 September 2004
- Recorded: 2003–2004
- Genres: Grime; hip hop
- Length: 51:00
- Labels: XL; Matador
- Producers: Dizzee Rascal; Youngstar; Cage; Taz; Vanguard; DJ Wonder

Dizzee Rascal chronology
| Boy in da Corner (2003) | Showtime (2004) | Maths + English (2007) |

Singles from Showtime
- 1. "Stand Up Tall" Released: 23 August 2004; 2. "Dream" Released: 8 November 2004; 3. "Off 2 Work"/"Graftin'" Released: 21 March 2005

Showtime is the second studio album by grime artist Dizzee Rascal, released on 6 September 2004 and 14 September in the United States. As of May 2007, the album has sold over 16,000 units in the United States—a decline on his debut album, Boy in da Corner, which sold 58,000. It has also been certified Gold by the British Phonographic Industry (BPI) for selling over 100,000 copies.

== Critical reception ==
Professional ratings
Aggregate scores
| Source | Rating |
|---|---|
| Metacritic | 87/100 |
Review scores
| Source | Rating |
| AllMusic | 4.5/5 stars |
| Blender | 4/5 stars |
| Entertainment Weekly | C+ |
| The Guardian | 4/5 stars |
| Mojo | 5/5 stars |
| NME | 9/10 |
| Pitchfork | 8.6/10 |
| Q | 4/5 stars |
| Rolling Stone | 3.5/5 stars |
| Spin | A− |

Showtime received critical acclaim from music critics. At Metacritic, which assigns a normalised rating out of 100 to reviews from mainstream critics, the album received an average score of 87 based on 28 reviews indicating "universal acclaim". AllMusic gave the album 4 and half stars out of 5 and wrote, "If Showtime isn't the equal artistic success of Boy in da Corner, it's slightly superior, stunning for the facts that it arrives so swiftly after the debut and is far from a retread". Rolling Stone gave the album 3 1/2 stars out of 5 stating that "These are Rascal's most accessible beats to date". The Village Voice gave the album a favourable review, calling it a "brash, dazzling dispatch from a parallel universe" and Billboard also gave a positive review of the album, remarking that "This is hip-hop for another era, one that makes the present day commercial U.S. material seem even more flat than it already is".

Scott Plagenhoef from Pitchfork felt that "The album naturally lacks the shock of the new, the jolt of Boy in Da Corner-- instead, it's a consolidation of his strengths, lyrically and sonically, and a more satisfying listen than its predecessor". PopMatters gave the album 9/10, opining that "Aside from a couple of hiccups (the clunky R&B of "Get By", the silly call and response of "Knock Knock"), it's every bit as good as Boy in da Corner, and sometimes even better". The Guardian gave the album 4 out of 5 stars, saying "Beyond his trademark agitated yelp and panic-attack rhythms are all manner of surprising and compelling sonic twists". NME gave the album 9/10, stating that "Lyrically it's astonishing" and Spin gave it a 9/10 saying it is "At its core, Showtime is a classic second album in the hip-hop sense: puffy with bluster, brimming with indignation". Alternative Press gave the album 5 out of 5 stars, writing that "It's the urgency of [Dizzee's] brash Brit patois that dares you not to decipher it". Mojo gave a very favourable review to the album, saying that "What Dizzee Rascal has done with this record is find his own—profoundly satisfying—balance between grime's digital vortex of ringtones and car alarms and an older more contemplative electronic tradition".

== Track listing ==
Showtime track listing
| No. | Title | Writer(s) | Producer(s) | Length |
|---|---|---|---|---|
| 1. | "Showtime" | Dylan Mills | Dizzee Rascal | 2:12 |
| 2. | "Stand Up Tall" | Mills; Daryl Nurse | Youngstar; Cage^{[b]} | 3:09 |
| 3. | "Everywhere" | Mills | Dizzee Rascal | 3:46 |
| 4. | "Graftin'" | Mills | Dizzee Rascal | 3:25 |
| 5. | "Learn" | Mills; Tesmond Rowe; Vanguard Vardoen | Taz; Vanguard | 3:21 |
| 6. | "Hype Talk" | Mills | Dizzee Rascal | 3:05 |
| 7. | "Face" (featuring Caramel) | Mills | Dizzee Rascal | 3:39 |
| 8. | "Respect Me" | Mills; Wayne Gardiner | DJ Wonder | 4:45 |
| 9. | "Get By" (featuring Vanya) | Mills | Dizzee Rascal | 3:24 |
| 10. | "Knock, Knock" | Mills | Dizzee Rascal | 3:27 |
| 11. | "Dream" | Mills; Nick Detnon; Oscar Hammerstein II; Richard Rodgers | Cage | 3:18 |
| 12. | "Girls" (featuring Marga Man) | Mills; Malik Alvez | Dizzee Rascal | 3:32 |
| 13. | "Imagine" | Mills | Dizzee Rascal | 2:54 |
| 14. | "Flyin'" | Mills | Dizzee Rascal | 3:26 |
| 15. | "Fickle" | Mills; Lamont Dozier | Dizzee Rascal | 4:01 |

Japanese bonus track
| No. | Title | Writer(s) | Producer | Length |
|---|---|---|---|---|
| 16. | "Give U More" (featuring D Double E) | Mills; Darren Dixon | Dizzee Rascal | 3:24 |

Notes

- ^{^[b]} signifies an additional producer.
- "Dream" contains a sample of Captain Sensible from his 1982 song "Happy Talk".
- "Fickle" contains a sample of Lamont Dozier from his 1974 song "Shine".

== Charts ==
=== Weekly charts ===
Weekly chart performance for Showtime
| Chart (2004–2005) | Peak position |
|---|---|
| Irish Albums (IRMA) | 65 |
| Scottish Albums (Official Charts) | 28 |
| UK Albums (Official Charts) | 8 |
| UK Independent Albums (Official Charts) | 1 |

2008 weekly chart performance for Showtime
| Chart (2008) | Peak position |
|---|---|
| UK Dance Albums (Official Charts) | 33 |

=== Year-end charts ===
Year-end chart performance for Showtime
| Chart (2004) | Position |
|---|---|
| UK Albums (OCC) | 147 |

== Certifications ==
Certifications and sales for Showtime
| Region | Certification | Certified units/sales |
|---|---|---|
| United Kingdom (BPI) | Gold | 100,000^{^} |
^{‡} Sales+streaming figures based on certification alone.
