= Maths + English =

Studio album by Dizzee Rascal
- Released: 4 June 2007
- Recorded: 2006–2007
- Genre: Grime; hip hop
- Length: 48:46
- Label: XL; Matador; Definitive Jux
- Producer: Dizzee Rascal; Shy FX

Dizzee Rascal chronology
Showtime (2004)	Maths + English (2007)	Tongue n' Cheek (2009)

Singles from Maths + English
- 1. "Sirens" Released: 21 May 2007; 2. "Pussyole" Released: 30 July 2007; 3. "Flex" Released: 19 November 2007

Professional ratings
Aggregate scores
Source	Rating
Metacritic	78/100
Review scores
Source	Rating
AllMusic	4/5 stars
Blender	4/5 stars
Entertainment Weekly	A−
The Guardian	4/5 stars
The Irish Times	4/5 stars
NME	7/10
The Observer	5/5 stars
Pitchfork	8.4/10
Rolling Stone	3.5/5 stars
Spin	2.5/5 stars

Maths + English is the third studio album by English rapper Dizzee Rascal. The album went gold in the UK after selling over 100,000 copies.

== Background ==
Maths + English entered the UK Albums Chart at number seven, one position higher than his second album, Showtime (2004), which charted at number eight and his debut, Boy in da Corner (2003), which peaked at number 23.

The track "Wanna Be" features guest vocals from English pop singer Lily Allen. It pays tribute to the 1976 musical Bugsy Malone, specifically the song "So You Want to Be a Boxer?" which shares the same musical arrangements for the sections sung by Lily Allen.

Joss Stone was expected to feature on the song "Da Feelin'", but Dizzee Rascal stated that the song sounded too "poppy" with Joss Stone's hook, so she does not appear on the album.

The track "Pussy'ole" is rumoured to be a Wiley diss. Wiley responded to the track in a video circulating on YouTube, in which he also takes jabs at rappers Kano and Lethal Bizzle.

American hip hop duo UGK are featured on the track "Where's da G's". In return, Dizzee was featured on the track "Two Type of Bitches" along with Pimpin' Ken on UGK's 2007 album Underground Kingz.

On 29 April 2008 Definitive Jux released Maths + English on their independent label in the United States. The Def Jux version features new studio tracks "G.H.E.T.T.O." and "Driving" as well as a remix of the UGK-assisted "Where's da G's" by Def Jux label head El-P. It does not however contain the track "Pussyole (Old Skool)", due to sample clearance issues.

== Track listing ==
Maths + English track listing
No.	Title	Length
1.	"World Outside"	3:08
2.	"Pussyole (Old Skool)"	3:28
3.	"Sirens"	3:30
4.	"Where's da G's" (featuring UGK)	4:54
5.	"Paranoid"	2:37
6.	"Suk My Dick"	2:59
7.	"Flex"	3:31
8.	"Da Feelin'"	3:57
9.	"Bubbles"	3:30
10.	"Excuse Me Please"	3:40
11.	"Hardback (Industry)"	4:11
12.	"Temptation" (featuring Alex Turner)	2:34
13.	"Wanna Be" (featuring Lily Allen)	3:24
14.	"U Can't Tell Me Nuffin'"	3:31

US bonus tracks
No.	Title	Length
15.	"G.H.E.T.T.O."	3:26
16.	"Driving with Nowhere to Go"	3:57
17.	"Where's da G's" (El-P remix)	4:38

Japanese bonus tracks
No.	Title	Length
15.	"Dean"	2:32
16.	"Sirens" (Chase & Status Remix)	5:34

Notes

- "Pussyole (Old Skool)" samples Lyn Collins' "Think (About It)" and Galactic Force Band's "Space Dust".
- "Sirens" was omitted from the US version.
- "Da Feelin'" was co-mixed by Shy FX.
- "Wanna Be" samples "So You Wanna Be a Boxer" from the film musical Bugsy Malone.

== Charts ==
Chart performance for Maths + English
Chart (2007)	Peak position
Australian Albums (ARIA)	120
Irish Albums (IRMA)	57
UK Albums (OCC)	7
UK Independent Albums (OCC)	1
