= Flex (Dizzee Rascal song) =

Single by Dizzee Rascal

from the album Maths + English
- Released: 19 November 2007
- Recorded: 2007
- Genre: UK garage, 2-step, grime
- Length: 3:31
- Label: XL
- Songwriter: Dylan Mills
- Producer: Dizzee Rascal

Dizzee Rascal singles chronology
"Pussyole (Old Skool)" (2007)	"Flex" (2007)	"Dance wiv Me" (2008)

"Flex" is the third single from British rapper Dizzee Rascal's third studio album Maths + English, and ninth overall. The song reached number 23 on the UK Singles Chart, while his previous single placed 1 higher at number 22, but topped the UK Indie Singles Chart for 2 weeks, while his previous single topped it only for a week.

== Music video ==
The video is set in a dream of Dizzee Rascal's after he falls asleep while watching TV, bored of the programs on it. The video parodies The X Factor as "Flex Factor" (though the video censors the "X" logo of The X Factor, which was on the TV Dizzee was watching). It features Reggie Yates as one of the three judges along with a woman and Dizzee Rascal. Rapper Mike Skinner of The Streets also features in the video as one of the performers, along with Peterborough United footballer Gabriel Zakuani and magician Dynamo. Instead of singing as on The X-Factor contestants, including Dizzee, dance on the Flex Factor - but all are considered bad by the judges apart from two girls dressed in black, who end up winning. Each girl kisses Dizzee on both cheeks at the end of the video, which then Dizzee stands up from his seat, pulls his pants up, and goes backstage with them, which Reggie later follows him. The video was directed by co-creator/director of Fonejacker and Facejacker, Ed Tracy.

== Track listings ==
CD

1. "Flex" (Original)
2. "Flex" (Dave Spoon Reflex)
3. "Flex" (Dave Spoon Redub)
4. "Flex" (Micky Slim Remix)
5. "Flex" (Micky Slim Dub)
6. "Flex" (D 70 Remix)

7" Vinyl

1. "Flex" (Original)
2. "Pussy'ole (Old Skool)" (Family of Five Remix)

== Charts ==
Chart (2007)	Peak position
Australian ARIA Club Charts	42
UK Singles (Official Charts)	23
UK Indie (Official Charts)	1
