= Zee Avi =

Zee Avi زي اۏي
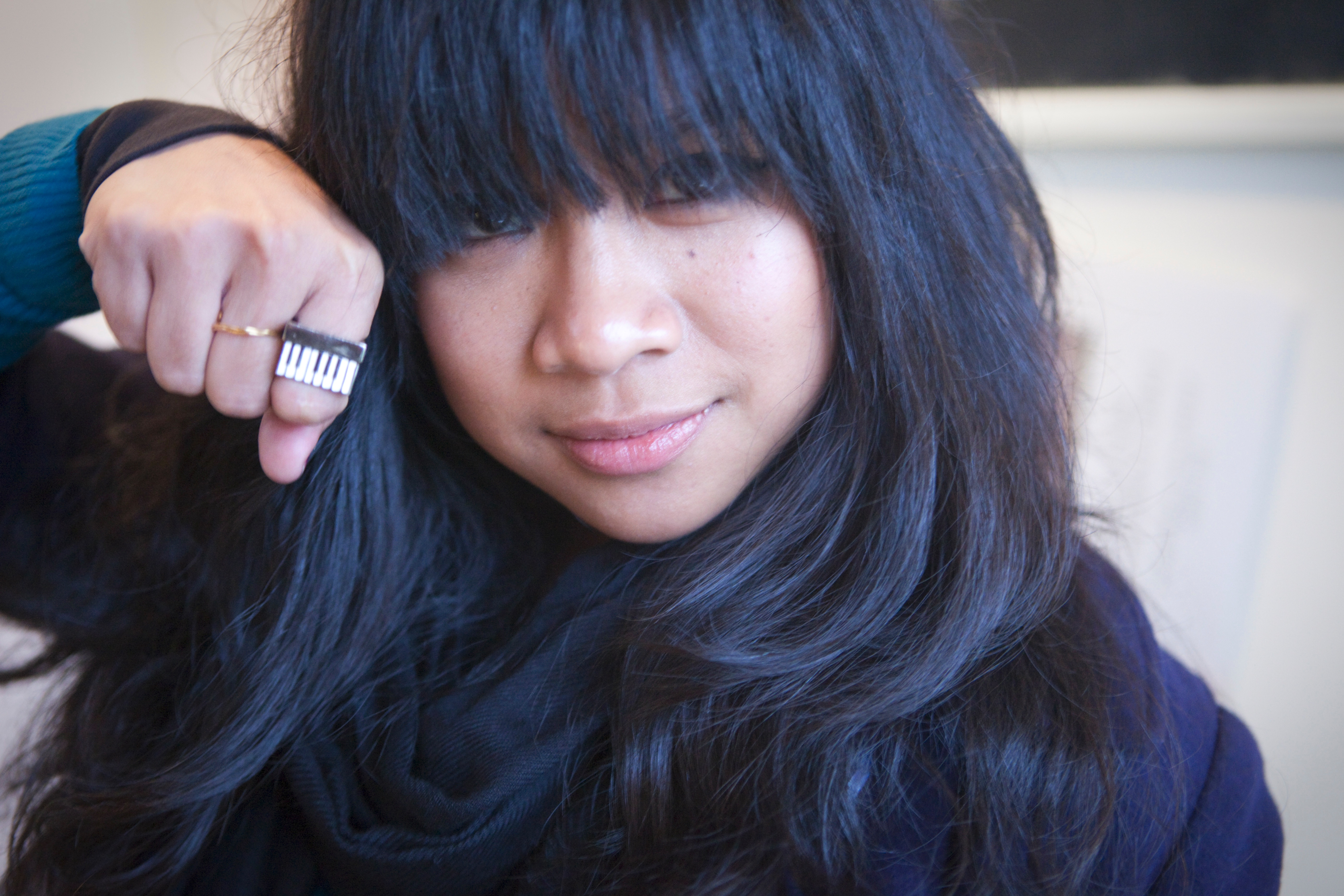
- Zee Avi in 2009 at TechCrunch event

Background information
- Also known as: KokoKaina
- Born: Izyan Alirahman; 15 December 1985 (age 40)
- Origin: Sarawak, Malaysia
- Genres: Indie rock, pop rock, jazz, Indie pop, Indie folk
- Occupations: Singer-songwriter; musician
- Instruments: Vocals; acoustic guitar; ukulele
- Label: Monotone Label/Brushfire
- Spouse: Kenji Matano (m. 2021)

Zee Avi (born Izyan Alirahman, also known as KokoKaina), PBK is a Malaysian singer-songwriter, guitarist, and ukulele player.

== Early life ==
She is originally from Miri, located in Sarawak, Malaysia on the island of Borneo. She moved to Kuala Lumpur at the age of 12 and taught herself to play the guitar at 17. Avi played rhythm guitar in a couple of bands while in Kuala Lumpur before moving to London to study fashion design at the American InterContinental University. After returning from London, she started writing songs.

== Musical career ==
=== Breakthrough ===
In September 2007, Avi posted a video of her first song, "Poppy" on YouTube for one of her friends who had missed her first performance in Kuala Lumpur. The friend convinced Avi to leave the video online even after he had seen it, and soon she received positive feedback. This inspired her to put more videos on YouTube.

Several months later, on the eve of her 22nd birthday, Avi posted what was supposed to be her final video "No Christmas For Me". The next day, YouTube put the spotlight on her video and Avi's mailbox was bombarded with more than 3,000 e-mails and a slew of offers from record labels.

After discovering her video, Patrick Keeler of The Raconteurs, passed the link to Ian Montone, the manager of The White Stripes, The Shins, The Raconteurs, M.I.A. and others. Montone then passed her music on to Emmett Malloy, who signed her to Brushfire Records, a record company that is partly owned by Jack Johnson. "No Christmas For Me" turned out to be her first official song with Brushfire Records. It was featured on Brushfire Records's 2008 charity Christmas album This Warm December: A Brushfire Holiday (Vol. 1).

=== 2009–2011: Debut with Zee Avi ===
Avi's self-titled debut album was released on 19 May 2009. The album was co-produced by Brushfire Records and Ian Montone's Monotone Records. On the day of the release, YouTube featured her on the front page in Spotlight: Music Tuesday. A day after that, she performed to a full house at the famed Roxy Theater in West Hollywood. The album went on to become the ninth best album of 2009 according to the Associated Press. She made her US television debut on 18 June 2009, performing her debut single "Bitter Heart" live on Last Call With Carson Daly.

=== 2011–2012: Ghostbird ===
Her second album Ghostbird was released on 23 August 2011. "The Book of Morris Johnson" was the first single off her sophomore effort. Ghostbird topped the US Billboard Heatseekers Albums chart and spawned hits like "Swell Window" and "Concrete Wall" after both songs were featured in Season 5 of the hit television series Gossip Girl. Avi has the distinction of being the first Malaysian singer to have albums on the US Billboard Hot 200 Albums chart and top a Billboard chart (Heatseekers Album).

She toured the United States with Pete Yorn from June to August 2009, the final leg being at the Music Box, Henry Fonda Theater in Hollywood, California on 27 August 2009. She opened for the multi-talented Jack Johnson during his concert at the Greek Theater, UC Berkeley on 6 October 2010, and had the honor of collaborating with Johnson on a live mash-up of their respective hits "Just You And Me" and "Breakdown." She also opened for Grammy-winning singer/songwriter and feminist icon Ani DiFranco at the Chameleon Club in Lancaster, Pennsylvania on 21 October 2011 to mark the 20th anniversary of World Cafe.

Avi has performed sets at some of the most celebrated music tours and festivals, namely SXSW in Austin, Texas (March 2009), Bonnaroo in Tennessee (June 2009), San Francisco's Outside Lands (August 2009), Byron Bay Bluesfest in Australia (April 2010), Lilith Fair in Ohio, New Jersey and Massachusetts (July 2010), Mountain Jam in New York (May–June 2012) and Rainforest World Music Festival in Kuching, Sarawak (July 2012).

She toured Asia in November 2011, performing in Tokyo, Seoul, Taipei, Singapore, Bali, Jakarta, Kuala Lumpur, Penang and Miri. This was followed by a US East Coast Tour in February 2012, with gigs in New York, Massachusetts, Philadelphia, Maryland and North Carolina. In September 2012, she performed in six cities during her California Tour.

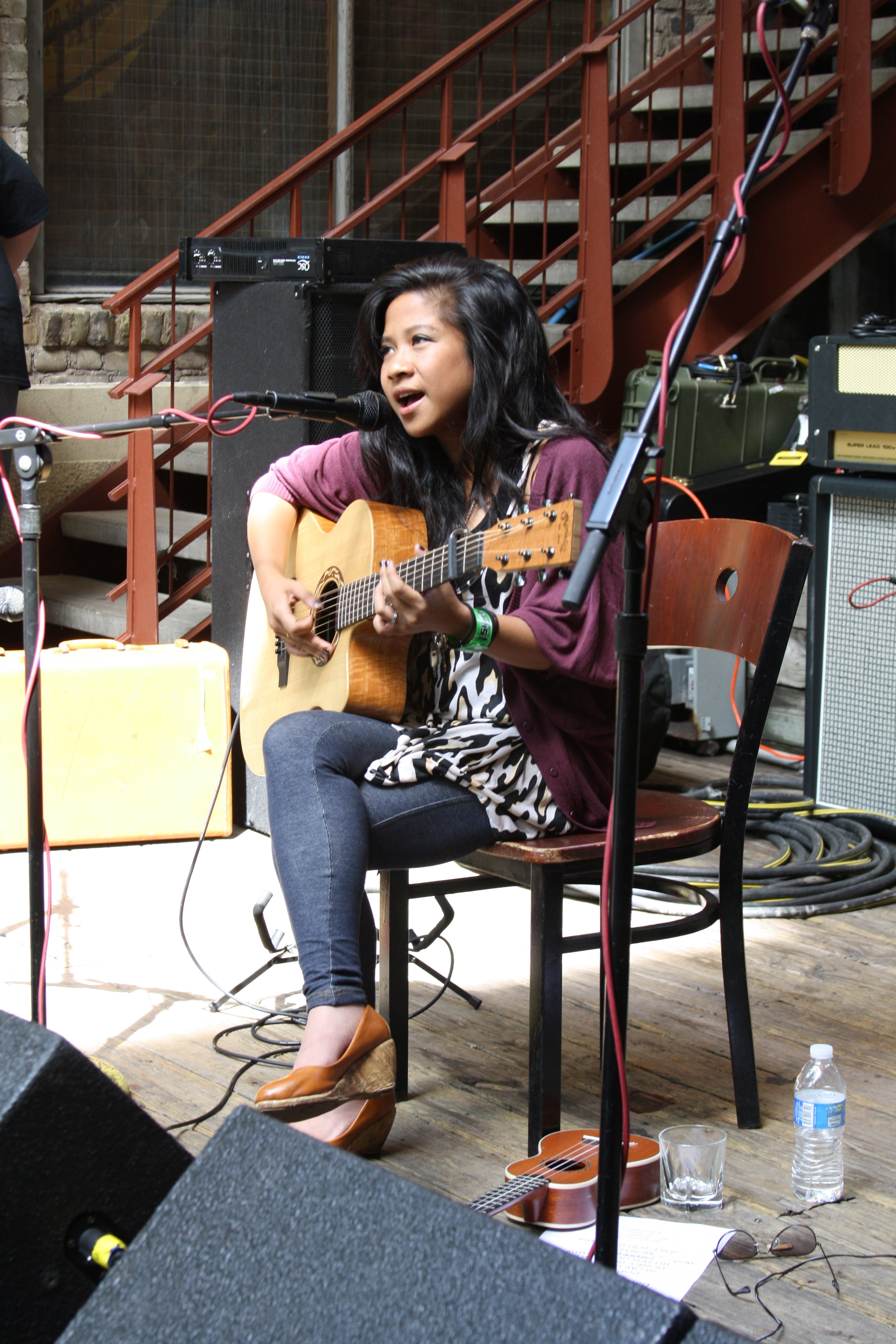
Zee Avi performing at South by Southwest on March 18, 2009, in Austin, Texas

In December 2012, Avi was conferred the state order and medal of Pegawai Bintang Kenyalang (Officer of the Order of the Star of Hornbill Sarawak) for her service to the state of Sarawak by the Yang di-Pertua Negeri (Head of State). The award is the Fifth Rank of the Darjah Yang Amat Mulia Bintang Kenyalang Sarawak (Most Illustrious Order of the Star of Hornbill Sarawak).

=== 2014–2016: Nightlight ===
Avi's latest offering is Nightlight, a 9-track album consisting of covers for children that was released on 22 April 2014. The album, which was recorded in Woodstock, New York within a span of just four days, includes covers of "Ben" (Michael Jackson); "The Rainbow Connection" (Kermit the Frog); "The Circle Game" (Joni Mitchell); "Colors of the Wind" (Judy Kuhn); and a medley of "Twinkle Twinkle Little Star," "Lima Anak Ayam," "Air Pasang Malam," "Lagu Tiga Kupang," "Sing A Song of Sixpence," and "Rock-a-bye Baby." Avi released two tracks from the album, The Velvet Underground's "Who Loves The Sun" and Bobby McFerrin's "Don't Worry, Be Happy" in February 2014, as teasers for her new record. Nightlight made it on the iTunes Best of 2014 Albums (Children's Music) list.

On 26 November 2016, Zee Avi won her first major international award with Best Original Film Song at the 53rd Taipei Golden Horse Film Festival and Awards for Arena Cahaya, the theme song she co-wrote and performed for one of Malaysia's highest-grossing films of all time, Ola Bola.

=== 2019-present: Third studio album, Ellipses ===
In August 2019, Zee announced that she is working on her upcoming third studio album titled Ellipses, which is her favourite punctuation. The first single of the yet-to-be released album, "Who are U?" was released on 2019 Malaysia Day. Ellipses will feature nine songs that she wrote over the past seven years and will be released independently. In December 2019, Novartis Malaysia chose Zee to compose a song, "My Skin" with the aim of creating awareness on psoriasis. The song was produced by Yuswa Ansari. The music video features psoriasis fighters from different background and was uploaded on Novartis Malaysia's YouTube channel on 9 December 2019.

== Artwork ==
Avi is also a visual artist and a lover of art. "The Book Of Morris Johnson", which is the lead single from her second album, was inspired by paintings by Morris Johnson, a Floridian folk artist. Avi's original artwork is featured on the CD of her second album Ghostbird. She also produced three art pieces for a charity project with Pledge Music. Some of her artworks, emblazoned on ukuleles, are also given away as gifts to a selected number of her fans.

== Musical influences ==
She cites swing bands, Gershwin and America jazz from the 1920s as influences. She has been likened to Ella Fitzgerald many times and one writer called her "the next heiress in the bloodline of young women with supernaturally classic voices".

She also describes herself as a "rock lover at heart". She has a diverse musical preference from The Carpenters to The Cranberries. She draws inspiration from Cat Power, Regina Spektor, Leonard Cohen, Tom Waits, Jolie Holland, Daniel Johnston and Chris Garneau, Billie Holiday, Ella Fitzgerald, Velvet Underground and Led Zeppelin.

== Awards and recognition ==
1. The Associated Press named Zee Avi (album) one of the Top 10 Albums of 2009 alongside albums by big names like Mariah Carey, Jay Z, Norah Jones and The Black Eyed Peas.
2. Zee Avi was nominated for "Break Out Award" and "Pop Star Award" at the 2010 Shout! Awards in Malaysia.
3. MSN Malaysia named Zee Avi one of the Top 10 Young Malaysians in 2011.
4. Zee Avi was bestowed the Youth Icon (International) Award by the Sarawak State Government in conjunction with Hari Perhimpunan Belia Negara 2011 Peringkat Negeri Sarawak (National Youth Assembly Day 2011 Sarawak State Level).
5. The Asia Pacific Brands Foundation presented Zee Avi with The BrandLaureate Grandmaster Brand Icon Leadership Award 2012 for Zee's achievements as a singer and songwriter, and for establishing a successful career in the international music scene.
6. Is This The End a song written and performed by Zee Avi, and featured in the independent film Transatlantic Coffee, was the recipient of the Bronze Medal for Excellence in the Best Impact of Music in a Feature Film (Artistic Excellence) category at the 2012 Park City Film Music Festival.
7. Zee Avi was conferred the Pegawai Bintang Kenyalang (Officer of the Order of the Star of Hornbill Sarawak) by the Yang di-Pertua Negeri (Head of State) in an investiture ceremony held in Kuching on 12 December 2012.
8. Nightlight was named one of iTunes Best of 2014 Albums in the Children's Music category.
9. The song Arena Cahaya, which she performed and co-wrote for the movie Ola Bola, won the Best Original Theme Song award at the 28th Malaysia Film Festival held on 3 September 2016 and Best Original Film Song at the prestigious 53rd Taipei Golden Horse Film Festival and Awards held on 26 November 2016.
10. Zee Avi was awarded "International Young Artiste Award" at the 2018 Top Asia Corporate Ball held in Jakarta, Indonesia.

== Discography ==
=== Studio albums ===
Title	Details	Peak chart positions
Title	Details	US Heat
Zee Avi	Released: 19 May 2009; Label: Bushfire Records, Monotone; Format: CD, LP, digital download	2
Ghostbird	Released: October 29, 2013; Label: Bushfire Records, Monotone; Format: CD, LP, digital download	1

=== Tribute album ===
- Nightlight (2014)

=== EPs ===
- One More Time With Colors (2010)
- Concrete Wall (remixes) (2012)

=== Singles ===
==== As lead artist ====
List of singles as lead artist, with selected chart positions, showing year released and album name
Title	Year	Album
"Bitter Heart"	2009	Zee Avi
"Just You And Me"	2009	Zee Avi
"Is This The End"	2009	Zee Avi
"The Book of Morris Johnson"	2011	Ghostbird
"Concrete Wall"	2012	Ghostbird
"31 Days"	2013	Ghostbird
"Saya Kamu"	2019	Non-album singles
"Who Are U"	2019	Non-album singles
"Good Things"	2020	Non-album singles
"Ok"	2022	Non-album singles

==== Non-album singles and collaborations ====
Year	Track	Artist	Album	Notes
2008	"No Christmas For Me"	Various artists	This Warm December: A Brushfire Holiday Vol. 1	
2011	"Frosty The Snowman"	Various artists	This Warm December: A Brushfire Holiday Vol. 2	
2012	"Tomorrow Is a Long Time"	Various artists	Chimes of Freedom: The Songs of Bob Dylan	
2013	"Heart Of The Moment"	Mansions On The Moon	Full Moon (EP)	Guest vocals
2014	"We'll Be Happy"	Aizat Amdan	Legasi	Duet
2014	"Heart Of The Moment"	Mansions On The Moon	Mansions On The Moon	Guest vocals
2015	"All The Way Up"	Haute Sound	N/A	Lead vocals
2015	"Our Vintage Love"	Dawen Wang	Kuai Le Bu Kuai Le (Happy Or Not)	Duet
2016	"Arena Cahaya"	Various artists	Ola Bola (Original Motion Picture Soundtrack)	
2020	"Make It Through"	Faizal Tahir and various artists	N/A	Lead vocals

== Videography ==
=== Music videos ===
Title	Year	Director	Notes
"Bitter Heart"	2009	Emmett Malloy	
"The Book of Morris Johnson"	2011	Aran Reo Mann	
"Concrete Wall"	2012	Jason Baum	This video earned Jason Baum a nomination for "Best Directional Debut" at the 2013 Music Video Production Association (MVPA) Awards.
"31 Days"	2013	Jason Baum	
"Saya, Kamu"	2019	Syahmi Norsan	
"Who Are U"	2019	Hafreez Amminuddin	
"Good Things" Official Lyric Video	2020	—N/a	Filmed in Johor.
"OK"	2022		Animation by Fiorella Bassil

=== Promotional videos ===
Year	Music video	Notes
2008	No Christmas For Me	Recorded live
2009	Medley (Honey Bee, Bitter Heart, Kantoi, Monte)	Recorded live from and above the Solar Powered Plastic Plant
2009	Slow Hands	Interpol cover (live); Director: Tim Wheeler, Producer: Josh Nicotra, Editor: Brenden Mendez
2010	Frosty The Snowman	Gene Autry cover (live)
2011	Medley (Anchor, Swell Window, The Book of Morris Johnson, Milestone Moon, 31 Days)	"Ghostbird" live performances

=== Charity videos ===
Year	Music video	Notes
2020	Make It Through	Fund-raising video for COVID-19 related charities. Alongside Faizal Tahir, Ning Baizura, Nabila Razali, As'ad Motawh, Alyssa Dezek, Nanasheme, Syada Amzah, Wafiy, Jestinna Kuan, Reshma, Eliya Keesha, Tilla Hanna, Adam Sang and Jay C.

== Concerts and tours ==
=== Tours ===
- 2011: Homecoming Tour
