= S.F.X. Boys' Choir, Liverpool =

British boys' choir

The S.F.X. Boys' Choir was a Catholic boys' choir that existed from 1994 to 2007. The choir received nationwide fame when the choir sang on the reworked version of The Farm's 1990 hit "Alltogethernow" and for gaining its place in the Guinness Book of World Records in 1998 for being the first (and only) choir to sing in all 49 cathedrals and abbeys in England and Wales.

== History ==
The boys in the choir were all pupils at the college. There were 24 choristers and 18 choral scholars; included in these numbers there were traditionally a head and deputy head chorister and 6 senior choristers that were appointed every September at the start of the school's calendar year. All of the choral scholars had sung with the choir as choristers, and several of them would go on to achieve honorary chorister status which was achieved by spending all 7 school years in the choir.

The choir toured England and Continental Europe from 1995 to 2005, including 3 separate tours to Italy, where they twice met and sang for Pope John Paul II in 1999 and 2002. The Choir also had a 3-week tour of the Eastern United States in August 2004, singing in Boston, New York, Philadelphia and Washington D.C. In total the choir sang in 90 different cathedrals worldwide in just 11 years.

Starting with the summer of 2001 up to the summer of 2005, the choir were official guests at Windsor Castle as 'choir-in-residence' singing services in St. George's Chapel for a week; this particular tour would usually include singing a week's services in Westminster Abbey.

The Choir released 8 CDs and occasionally made radio and television appearances, including Christmas 2000, when they sang Carols 'live' on 6 consecutive evenings after Granada Reports evening news had finished. Also from 2001 to 2006 they led the Hillsborough Memorial Service at Anfield Stadium and also led the BBC Radio Merseyside Carol Service in Liverpool Cathedral which was broadcast every Christmas Eve. Also in 2001 the choir sang a special version of "You'll Never Walk Alone" before Liverpool's 4th-round second leg tie against AS Roma.

Perhaps their most famous moment was being part of England's Official Euro 2004 song, which was a special version of 'Alltogethernow' with the band 'The Farm'. The song reached #5 in the U.K. singles chart; the choir received a gold disc and performed the song live on Top of the Pops in June 2004; the song was also performed live at a match between England and Iceland before Euro 2004 began.

In 2000 they won the National School Choir Festival.

== Choir tours ==
- April 1994 - Bury St. Edmunds
- April 1995 - Venice/Florence, ITALY
- August 1995 - Lincoln
- March 1996 - Kraków, POLAND
- July 1996 - St. Albans
- April 1997 - Paris, FRANCE
- July 1997 - St. Albans
- October 1997 - Canterbury
- April 1998 - Barcelona, SPAIN
- July 1998 - Oxford
- October 1998 - Canterbury
- April 1999 - York
- May 1999 - Bury St. Edmunds
- August 1999 - Rome, ITALY
- October 1999 - Canterbury
- April 2000 - Bury St. Edmunds
- May 2000 - Ripon
- July 2000 - Cologne, GERMANY
- July 2000 - St. Albans
- October 2000 - Lincoln
- April 2001 - York
- May 2001 - Bath
- July 2001 - Prague, CZECH REPUBLIC
- July 2001 - Windsor Castle
- October 2001 - Salisbury and Winchester
- April 2002 - Lincoln
- May 2002 - York
- July 2002 - Windsor Castle and Westminster Abbey
- August 2002 - Rome, ITALY
- October 2002 - St. Albans
- April 2003 - HOLLAND and BELGIUM
- May 2003 - Lincoln
- July 2003 - Windsor Castle
- October 2003 - Salisbury and Winchester
- April 2004 - York
- June 2004 - Peterborough and Ely
- July 2004 - Windsor Castle and Westminster Abbey
- August 2004 - Boston, New York and Washington, UNITED STATES OF AMERICA
- October 2004 - Salisbury and Winchester
- February 2005 - Norwich
- March 2005 - Durham
- July 2005 - Vienna, AUSTRIA
- August 2005 - Windsor Castle and Westminster Abbey
- October 2005 - Canterbury
