= Pussyole (Old Skool) =

Single by Dizzee Rascal

from the album Maths + English
- B-side: "My Life"
- Released: 30 July 2007
- Recorded: 2007
- Genre: British hip hop; grime
- Length: 3:28
- Label: XL
- Songwriters: Dylan Mills; Nick Detnon
- Producers: Dizzee Rascal; Mr. Cage

Dizzee Rascal singles chronology
"Sirens" (2007)	"Pussyole (Old Skool)" (2007)	"Flex" (2007)

Music video
- "Old Skool" on YouTube

"Pussyole (Old Skool)" (also known as just "Pussyole" and cleanly as "Old Skool") is a song by British rapper Dizzee Rascal from his third studio album Maths + English (2007). It was released as the second single from the album on 30 July 2007 by XL Recordings. Widely interpreted as a diss track aimed at former mentor Wiley, the word "pussyole" is an urban British slang term for someone who is weak and unwilling to back up their friends during confrontation. "Pussyole (Old Skool)" received generally positive reviews and was a top 40 hit in the United Kingdom, peaking at number 22 on the UK Singles Chart.

== Wiley ==
The song is rumoured to be a diss to former friend Wiley of the Roll Deep crew, with whom he had a conflict, which made Dizzee (who was once a member) leave the crew. Wiley responded to the song in a video circulating on YouTube, in which he also takes jabs at rappers Kano and Lethal Bizzle, and then later with the track "Letter 2 Dizzee", from his album Playtime Is Over, to try to end the rift between them.

In the clean version, the chorus is removed, because of the repetition of the phrase "Pussyole".

== Samples ==
The song samples the "Yeah! Woo!" break from Lyn Collins' "Think (About It)". Because of sample clearance issues, the song was removed from the Definitive Jux copies of the album in the US.

== Critical reception ==
"Pussyole (Old Skool)" received generally positive reviews from music critics. AllMusic highlighted the song as a standout track from Maths + English. Pitchfork described the track as "seething with frustrated disappointment over the duplicity of an ex-friend", and would later name it the 28th-best song of 2007 while praising its "galloping, insistent production and forceful rhymes". The Guardian would also rank "Pussyole (Old Skool)" number 7 in their list of the best singles of the year and called the track "tremendous and break-heavy".

In NME writer Alex Miller's review of the album, Miller praised the song as "a dancefloor smash unlike anything else he has ever recorded". Boomkat was also highly positive: "Without a doubt one of the standout tracks from Dizzee Rascal's recent Maths and English joint, and one of the heaviest club joints the man has ever put his name to - 'Pussyole' is just the kind of sh*t we all knew Diz could produce... this track is pure future hip-hop and although the 'Oldskool' subtitle might be suggesting that the man's looking to the past, this still sounds like nothing else on the planet." They also praised the single's inclusion of extra mixes and the b-side track "My Life".

== Commercial performance ==
A week before the song's release as a physical single, "Pussyole (Old Skool)" debuted at number 95 on the UK Singles Chart on 28 July 2007, primarily due to strong downloads from Maths + English, climbing to number 80 the following week also solely on downloads. "Pussyole (Old Skool)" would reach a peak of number 22 in its third week on 11 August 2007 after its physical release, making the song Dizzee's eighth top 40 hit in the United Kingdom. It spent a total of seven weeks in the top 100, longer than his previous single "Sirens", which only spent four. Had downloads not been fully integrated into the charts that year in January 2007, "Pussyole (Old Skool)" would have peaked at number 11 on physical sales alone.

"Pussyole (Old Skool)" also reached number 4 on the UK Hip Hop and R&B Singles Chart and topped the UK Independent Singles Chart for a week. By 2010, the single had sold over 58,000 copies.

== Track listing ==
Digital download

1. "Old Skool (Pussyole)" (clean version) – 3:31
2. "Pussyole (Old Skool)" (instrumental) – 3:31
3. "Pussyole (Old Skool)" (acappella) – 3:28

EP

1. "Old Skool (Pussyole)" (clean version) – 3:31
2. "Pussyole (Old Skool)" (Live at Koko) – 4:10
3. "Pussyole (Old Skool)" (instrumental) – 3:31
4. "Pussyole (Old Skool)" (acappella) – 3:28

UK CD

1. "Pussyole (Old Skool)" (explicit version) – 3:29
2. "Old Skool (Pussyole)" (clean version) – 3:28
3. "My Life" (featuring Newham Generals) – 3:10
4. "My Life" (instrumental) – 3:07
5. "Pussyole (Old Skool)" (instrumental) – 3:29
6. "Pussyole (Old Skool)" (acappella) – 3:28

UK 7-inch vinyl

1. "Pussyole (Old Skool)" (explicit version) – 3:29
2. "Old Skool (Pussyole)" (clean version) – 3:28

UK 12-inch vinyl

1. "Pussyole (Old Skool)" (explicit version) – 3:29
2. "Pussyole (Old Skool)" (acappella) – 3:28
3. "Old Skool (Pussyole)" (clean version) – 3:28
4. "Pussyole (Old Skool)" (instrumental) – 3:29

== Charts ==
Weekly chart performance for "Pussyole (Old Skool)"
Chart (2007)	Peak position
Scottish Singles Sales (Official Charts)	22
UK Singles (Official Charts)	22
UK Hip Hop/R&B (Official Charts)	4
UK Indie (Official Charts)	1

2009 weekly chart performance for "Pussyole (Old Skool)"
Chart (2009)	Peak position
UK Indie (Official Charts)	49

== Release history ==
Release dates and formats for "Pussyole (Old Skool)"
Region	Date	Format(s)	Label(s)	Ref.
United Kingdom	30 July 2007	7-inch vinyl; 12-inch vinyl; CD; maxi CD	XL	
United Kingdom	30 July 2007	Digital download; EP	XL	
