= Let Me Kiss You =

2004 single by Morrissey

Single by Morrissey

from the album You Are the Quarry
- B-side: "Don't Make Fun of Daddy's Voice"; "Friday Mourning"; "I Am Two People"
- Released: 11 October 2004
- Genre: Alternative rock, indie pop
- Length: 3:30
- Label: Attack
- Songwriters: Morrissey, Alain Whyte
- Producer: Jerry Finn

Morrissey singles chronology
"First of the Gang to Die" (2004)	"Let Me Kiss You" (2004)	"I Have Forgiven Jesus" (2004)

"Let Me Kiss You" is a song written by Morrissey and Alain Whyte. It was recorded (in two separate versions) by both Morrissey and by Nancy Sinatra, both of whom released their version as a single in the United Kingdom on 11 October 2004. Both versions entered the UK Singles Chart, Morrissey's peaking at number eight and Sinatra's at number 46. Morrissey's version also reached number 19 in Sweden and number 44 in Ireland.

== Morrissey version ==
Morrissey's version of the song features on his album You Are the Quarry. It was also Morrissey's third top ten single of 2004.

The single also saw the release of the track "Don't Make Fun of Daddy's Voice", a song that had been in Morrissey's live set list since May and had opened his set at the Glastonbury Festival that year despite being unreleased.

=== Track listings ===
7" vinyl and CD 1

1. "Let Me Kiss You"
2. "Don't Make Fun of Daddy's Voice"

CD 2

1. "Let Me Kiss You"
2. "Friday Mourning"
3. "I Am Two People"

Country	Record label	Format	Catalogue number
UK	Attack/Sanctuary	7" vinyl	ATKSE008
UK	Attack/Sanctuary	CD 1	ATKXS008
UK	Attack/Sanctuary	CD 2	ATKXD008

=== Personnel ===
- Morrissey: vocals
- Alain Whyte: guitar
- Boz Boorer: guitar
- Gary Day: bass
- Deano Butterworth: drums
- Roger Manning: keyboard

=== Charts ===
Chart (2004)	Peak position
Ireland (IRMA)	44
Scotland Singles (OCC)	11
Sweden (Sverigetopplistan)	19
UK Singles (OCC)	8
UK Indie (OCC)	1

== Nancy Sinatra version ==
Nancy Sinatra's version was a minor UK hit, and features the exact same production team and backing musicians as Morrissey's version. However, the two versions do not use the exact same backing track, with Sinatra's version using subtle electronics and a slightly different arrangement which also features Morrissey on backing vocals. This single was released on Morrissey's vanity label, Attack Records.

=== Charts ===
Chart (2004)	Peak position
Scotland Singles (OCC)	46
UK Singles (OCC)	46
