= Dream (Dizzee Rascal song) =

Single by Dizzee Rascal

from the album Showtime
- Released: 8 November 2004
- Recorded: 2003
- Genre: British hip hop
- Length: 3:20
- Label: XL Recordings
- Songwriter(s): Dylan Mills
- Producer(s): Dizzee Rascal

Dizzee Rascal singles chronology
"Stand Up Tall" (2004)	"Dream" (2004)	"Off 2 Work" / "Graftin'" (2005)

"Dream" is the fifth single from British rapper Dizzee Rascal and the second from his second album Showtime. The single became his fifth top forty hit and second consecutive top twenty hit in the UK Singles Chart peaking at number fourteen, his second highest charting single at the time. "Dream" became his longest running single to chart in the UK singles chart, spending eight weeks inside the top seventy-five.

"Dream" is built around a prominent sample of Captain Sensible's "Happy Talk" from the 1949 Rodgers and Hammerstein musical South Pacific.. The album version and first single version feature simply the sample hook and a bassline and are without drum beats or percussion, but the "single mix" and the video version of the song feature a drum beat, produced by Dizzee Rascal, as well.

== Music video ==
The music video for "Dream" begins as some building blocks (with animals printed on them) rotate to reveal the name "Dizzee Rascal". A children's music box tune plays as the camera zooms in on a woman at a piano, who says "Hello boys and girls, shall we see what Dizzee Rascal's up to today? He's such a rascal," a parody based on Annette Mills and Muffin the Mule. She then starts playing the piano and the song starts. Dizzee appears out of a music box, and starts by wondering "how [he's] going to pull this off, man, without singing the dots." He then states that the track he's rapping on is "too sensible for [him]," a nod to this song's sample of a Captain Sensible song. Then he starts rapping the song. During the video, several incidents happen; two puppet men steal a TV, and the puppet police appear in a police car, and beat the puppet thieves; another puppet spray paints a shop wall; an ostrich dances on a bench; Dizzee walks into a disco; Dizzee raps for a microphone in a recording studio, with a pony puppet as a DJ; two puppets walk on screen pushing prams containing ugly babies. The video ends with Dizzee climbing back into his music box, and the lady says "Goodbye, Dizzee, Goodbye, Boys and Girls, Goodbye..." and the building block logo appears again, and the video ends.

== Track listing ==
CD 1

1. "Dream" (album version)
2. "Is this Real?"

CD 2

1. "Dream" (single mix)
2. "Trapped"
3. "Imagine" [Live at Austin, Texas 20/3/2004]

Vinyl

1. "Dream" (single mix)
2. "Dream" (album version)
3. "Trapped"
4. "Trapped" (instrumental)

== Charts ==
Chart (2004)	Peak position
UK Singles (OCC)	14
UK Hip Hop/R&B (OCC)	7
UK Indie (OCC)	1
