= First of the Gang to Die =

2004 single by Morrissey

Single by Morrissey

from the album You Are the Quarry
- B-side: "My Life Is a Succession of People Saying Goodbye"; "Teenage Dad on His Estate"; "Mexico"
- Released: 12 July 2004
- Genre: Alternative rock
- Length: 3:38
- Label: Attack
- Songwriters: Morrissey, Alain Whyte
- Producer: Jerry Finn

Morrissey singles chronology
"Irish Blood, English Heart" (2004)	"First of the Gang to Die" (2004)	"Let Me Kiss You" (2004)

"First of the Gang to Die" is a song co-written by Morrissey from his 2004 album You Are the Quarry. It was released in July 2004 as the second single from the album. It was written by Morrissey and Alain Whyte, the two being responsible for lyrics and music respectively. Following the success of "Irish Blood, English Heart", from the same album, the single reached the number six spot in the UK Singles Chart, giving Morrissey two top ten hits in a row for the first time since "The Last of the Famous International Playboys" and "Interesting Drug" both reached the top ten in 1989.

The single was A-Listed by BBC Radio 2 and received much more exposure than "Irish Blood, English Heart", propelling it onto the UK top 40 airplay chart. It entered the UK Singles Chart at number six, making it the third-highest-charting song and most successful follow-up single of Morrissey's career. The single stayed in the chart for seven weeks, longer than any other Morrissey single. Outside the United Kingdom, the song reached number 20 in Sweden and number 26 in Ireland, while becoming a minor hit in Germany and the Netherlands.

The song, which tells the story of a gang member named Hector, is seen as a tribute to Morrissey's significant Hispanic fanbase. Whyte commented, "All these Hispanic kids were coming to see us, with quiffs and leather jackets, shouting for Morrissey. The Latinos embraced him because they relate to all that isolation in his lyrics. They feel like outsiders in their own country. Plus, they have a very romantic sensibility and love the whole rocker image."

In October 2011, NME placed it at number 147 on its list "150 Best Tracks of the Past 15 Years".

== Usage in media ==
The second episode of The Mosquito Coast, an Apple TV+ drama series, is titled after the song and features a scene in which it is prominently used. The song also plays in the 2018 Marvel film Ant-Man and the Wasp.

== Track listings ==
7-inch vinyl and CD (UK)

1. "First of the Gang to Die"
2. "My Life Is a Succession of People Saying Goodbye"

DVD

1. "First of the Gang to Die" (live Manchester 22 May 2004) (video)
2. "First of the Gang to Die" (audio)
3. "Teenage Dad on His Estate" (audio)
4. "Mexico" (audio)

CD (USA) and 12-inch vinyl (UK)

1. "First of the Gang to Die"
2. "My Life Is a Succession of People Saying Goodbye"
3. "Teenage Dad on His Estate"
4. "Mexico"

Country	Record label	Format	Catalogue number
UK	Attack/Sanctuary	7-inch vinyl	ATKSI003
UK	Attack/Sanctuary	12-inch vinyl	ATKTW019
UK	Attack/Sanctuary	CD	ATKDX003
UK	Attack/Sanctuary	DVD	ATKTW020

== Personnel ==
- Morrissey: vocals
- Alain Whyte: guitar
- Boz Boorer: guitar
- Gary Day: bass
- Deano Butterworth: drums
- Roger Manning: keyboard

== Charts ==
=== Weekly charts ===
Chart (2004)	Peak position
Germany (GfK)	83
Ireland (IRMA)	26
Netherlands (Single Top 100)	90
Scottish Singles Sales (Official Charts)	8
Sweden (Sverigetopplistan)	20
UK Singles (Official Charts)	6
UK Indie (Official Charts)	1

=== Year-end charts ===
Chart (2004)	Position
UK Singles (OCC)	163

== Certifications ==
Region	Certification	Certified units/sales
United Kingdom (BPI)	Silver	200,000^{‡}
^{‡} Sales+streaming figures based on certification alone.

== Cover versions ==
A cover version of the song was recorded by the singer Zee Avi, featured on her 2009 self-titled debut album.

A Spanish-language version of the song entitled El Primero del Gang was included on Mexrrissey's 2016 album No Manchester.

Chrissie Hynde created a version as a duet with Cat Power as a track on her "Duets Special" album released on 17 October 2025.

== See also ==
- Morrissey discography
