= Stand Up Tall =

Single by Dizzee Rascal

from the album Showtime
- Released: 23 August 2004
- Recorded: 2003
- Genre: Grime
- Length: 3:09
- Label: XL Recordings
- Songwriter: Dylan Mills
- Producers: Youngstar & Cage

Dizzee Rascal singles chronology
| "Jus' a Rascal" (2003) | "Stand Up Tall" (2004) | "Dream" (2004) |

"Stand Up Tall" is the fourth single released by the British rapper Dizzee Rascal and the lead single from his second album Showtime.

The single became Dizzee's fourth Top 40 hit when it entered the charts at number 10 on its release. It was the first Top 10 release from the rapper. "Stand Up Tall" spent a total of six weeks in the Top 75, the first single from Dizzee to have been released on two alternative CD singles.

On Jools Holland's 2010 Hootenanny television show, Rascal performed a version of the song over the backing track of Nirvana's song "Smells Like Teen Spirit".

The song is used on the EA Sports' video-game, FIFA Street and in the 2005 film The 40-Year-Old Virgin.

== Track listing ==
CD 1

1. Stand Up Tall
2. Give U More (featuring D Double E)

CD 2

1. Stand Up Tall
2. Stand Up Tall (Instrumental)
3. Stand Up Tall (Youngsta Remix)
4. Stand Up Tall (Youngsta Remix Instrumental)
5. Stand Up Tall (Acappella)

== Music video ==
Dizzee Rascal drives to a place and finds four girls. They are fighting. The four girls follow him everywhere. At the end there are countless women pole dancing.

The music video was directed by Ruben Fleischer.

== Charts ==
Weekly chart performance for "Stand Up Tall"
| Chart (2004) | Peak position |
|---|---|
| Scottish Singles Sales (Official Charts) | 29 |
| UK Singles (Official Charts) | 10 |
| UK Dance (Official Charts) | 1 |
| UK Indie (Official Charts) | 1 |
