= Irish Blood, English Heart =

2004 single by Morrissey

Single by Morrissey

from the album You Are the Quarry
- B-side: "It's Hard to Walk Tall When You're Small"; "Munich Air Disaster 1958"; "The Never Played Symphonies"
- Released: 12 April 2004
- Length: 2:37
- Label: Attack
- Songwriters: Morrissey; Alain Whyte
- Producer: Jerry Finn

Morrissey singles chronology
"Satan Rejected My Soul" (1997)	"Irish Blood, English Heart" (2004)	"First of the Gang to Die" (2004)

"Irish Blood, English Heart" is a song by British singer Morrissey, released as the lead single to his seventh studio album You Are the Quarry. His first new song in seven years, it was released on 12 April 2004 in the United States and on 10 May 2004 in the United Kingdom.

The song, described as "the most unambiguously political of his career to date", touches upon Morrissey's identity as the son of Irish immigrants living in England. Driven by the hype of Morrissey's comeback, it became his highest-charting single in the United Kingdom (alongside 2006's "You Have Killed Me"), reaching number three on the UK Singles Chart. It is also his highest-charting single in Sweden, peaking at number four, and it reached number seven in Canada and the top 20 in Ireland and Norway.

== Background and composition ==
"Irish Blood, English Heart" is one of the oldest-written songs on You Are the Quarry. Morrissey first revealed its existence in a 1999 interview with The Irish Times, introducing it as the likely title track to his next album. He first performed the song live in 2002, referring to the title as "the components that make up my tubby little body."

The song's lyrics examine Morrissey's identity as an Englishman of Irish descent, with him proudly proclaiming that "There is no one on Earth I'm afraid of/ And no regime can buy or sell me". The lyrics also express Morrissey's hope that in the future Englishness will be not be associated with being "baneful" and "To be standing by the flag not feeling shameful, racist or partial". The song ends with Morrissey expressing his wishes that eventually the English public will denounce both the Conservative and Labour Party along with Oliver Cromwell and "this royal line/ That still salute him and will salute him forever". Morrissey stated in an interview that "[the lyrics] touch upon the disgust I feel for the British political system".

The song has drawn a particular following from Mexican Americans and Hispanic and Latino Americans in the United States, who resonate with its themes of "split identity."

== Release ==
In the United Kingdom, the song was first played by Steve Lamacq on BBC Radio 1 on 29 March 2004. However, Radio 1 did not playlist the single. Only XFM, which playlisted it, provided much exposure for the single in the UK. Despite the lack of exposure on mainstream stations, "Irish Blood, English Heart" debuted at number three on the UK Singles Chart, making it Morrissey's joint highest-charting single with or without The Smiths, alongside "You Have Killed Me" when it was released in 2006.

Early predictions had the song reaching the number one spot, and after only debuting at number three, Morrissey criticised BBC Radio 1 for not playing the song enough despite being "the only British single in the top five."

The single's world premiere occurred on the KROQ-FM Kevin and Bean show on 22 March 2004. The song received consistent airplay throughout April and May on such alternative rock stations as WFNX (Boston), WWCD (Columbus), CIMX (Windsor), KMBY (Monterey / Salinas), XTRA (San Diego), and of course KROQ-FM (Los Angeles), as well as CFNY (Toronto). The single's airplay increased over the next few months and upon its release it reached number 36 on the Modern Rock Tracks chart, Morrissey's first single to chart there since "The More You Ignore Me, The Closer I Get" in 1994.

== Live performances ==
The song was performed live by Morrissey on his 2002, 2004, 2006, 2007, 2008, 2009, 2011, and 2014 tours. From the 2004 tour it was recorded and put on the DVD, Who Put the M in Manchester?. In December 2013, Morrissey played "Irish Blood, English Heart" as the last of his three-song set during the Nobel Peace Prize Concert in Oslo.

== Track listings ==
UK 7-inch single and CD1

1. "Irish Blood, English Heart"
2. "It's Hard to Walk Tall When You're Small"

UK CD2

1. "Irish Blood, English Heart"
2. "Munich Air Disaster 1958"
3. "The Never Played Symphonies"

UK 12-inch single; US 7-inch and CD single

1. "Irish Blood, English Heart"
2. "It's Hard to Walk Tall When You're Small"
3. "Munich Air Disaster 1958"
4. "The Never Played Symphonies"

== Personnel ==
- Morrissey: vocals
- Alain Whyte: guitar
- Boz Boorer: guitar
- Gary Day: bass
- Dean Butterworth: drums
- Roger Manning: keyboard

== Charts ==
=== Weekly charts ===
Chart (2004)	Peak position
Belgium (Ultratip Bubbling Under Flanders)	17
Canada (Nielsen SoundScan)	7
Europe (Eurochart Hot 100)	11
France (SNEP)	66
Germany (GfK)	65
Ireland (IRMA)	17
Italy (FIMI)	48
Norway (VG-lista)	18
Scotland Singles (OCC)	4
Sweden (Sverigetopplistan)	4
UK Singles (OCC)	3
UK Indie (OCC)	1
US Alternative Airplay (Billboard)	36

=== Year-end charts ===
Chart (2004)	Position
UK Singles (OCC)	136

== Release history ==
Region	Date	Format(s)	Label(s)	Ref.
United States	12 April 2004	Hot adult contemporary; triple A radio	Attack	
United Kingdom	10 May 2004	7-inch vinyl; CD	Attack	

== Media usage ==
An edited version eventually became one of the songs on the EA Sports video game FIFA Football 2005's soundtrack. The game's version does not include the line "And spit upon the name Oliver Cromwell/And denounce this royal line that still salutes him. And will salute him, forever"; instead, after the verse "I've been dreaming of a time when/The English are sick to death of Labour and Tories", the song reverts to the line that begins "To be standing by the flag not feeling shameful/Racist or partial".

== See also ==
- Irish Briton
