= There Is a Light That Never Goes Out =

1992 single by the Smiths

Single by the Smiths

from the album The Queen Is Dead
- Released: 12 October 1992
- Recorded: September–November 1985
- Studio: Jacobs (Farnham, Surrey)
- Genre: Alternative rock; jangle pop
- Length: 4:02
- Label: WEA
- Composer: Johnny Marr
- Lyricist: Morrissey
- Producers: Johnny Marr; Morrissey

The Smiths singles chronology
| "Last Night I Dreamt That Somebody Loved Me" (1987) | "There Is a Light That Never Goes Out" (1992) | "Sweet and Tender Hooligan" (1995) |

Alternative cover
- 1987 French 7-inch single art

"There Is a Light That Never Goes Out" is a song by the English rock band the Smiths, written by guitarist Johnny Marr and lead vocalist Morrissey. Featured on the band's third studio album The Queen Is Dead (1986), it was not released as a single in the United Kingdom until 1992, five years after their break-up, to promote the compilation album ...Best II. It peaked at No. 25 on the UK Singles Chart and No. 22 on the Irish Singles Chart. The song has received considerable critical acclaim; in 2014, NME listed it as the 12th-greatest song of all time. In 2021, it was ranked at No. 226 on Rolling Stone's list of the "500 Greatest Songs of All Time".

In 2005, Morrissey released a live version of the song as a double A-side with his cover of Patti Smith's "Redondo Beach", reaching No. 11 on the UK Singles Chart. In Ireland, the song was released alone and peaked at No. 45.

== Origin and recording ==
The Smiths began working on "There Is a Light That Never Goes Out" during their late-1985 recording sessions at London's RAK Studios. In early September, the band recorded a rehearsal tape of the song performed in the key of F♯ minor. Four days later, the group made a monitor mix in the key of C♯ minor, this time accompanied by a synthesised string arrangement Marr created on an E-mu Emulator (credited to the "Hated Salford Ensemble" on the album release). In his autobiography, Morrissey stated that he was initially sceptical of the song and suggested to Marr that it be left off The Queen Is Dead. He later reflected with relief that he had been mistaken, as the song went on to become one of The Smiths' most popular songs.

The recording was completed in November at Jacobs Studios in Farnham, Surrey, where Morrissey redid his vocal part twice and Marr added a flute melody. Marr later described the recording process of the song as "magical" and commented, "Someone told me that if you listen with the volume really, really up you can hear me shout 'That was amazing' right at the end."

== Composition and lyrics ==
There Is a Light That Never Goes Out
Sample of "There Is a Light That Never Goes Out" by the Smiths, from their third studio album The Queen Is Dead (1986).

It was written in tandem with "Bigmouth Strikes Again". The two songs share the same key as well as similar chords. Simon Goddard noted both the guitar break in "Bigmouth Strikes Again" and the flute section in "There Is a Light That Never Goes Out" (originally written as a guitar part) are based on C♯ minor arpeggio figure. The song features an ascending F♯m–A–B chord sequence that guitarist Johnny Marr took from the Rolling Stones cover of Marvin Gaye's "Hitch Hike". Marr said in 1993 he included the figure as an "in-joke" to determine if the music press would attribute the inspiration for the part to "There She Goes Again" by the Velvet Underground, who he contended "stole" the figure from "Hitch Hike". Marr commented, "I knew I was smarter than that. I was listening to what the Velvet Underground were listening to".

AllMusic's Tim DiGravina argues that, while depressed characters were a regular feature in Morrissey's work, his lyric on "There Is a Light That Never Goes Out" "ups the sad-and-doomed quotient by leaps and bounds." Goddard argues in his book Songs That Saved Your Life (2002) that the basic narrative story is similar to that of the James Dean film Rebel Without a Cause (1955), in which Dean—an idol of Morrissey's—leaves his tortuous home life, being the passenger to a potential romantic partner. In fact, a line from that movie ("It is not my home") is alluded to in the song. According to Goddard, an earlier version lacked some of the finished version's ambiguity, culminating in the line "There is a light in your eyes and it never goes out". Uncut also cited the British kitchen sink drama Saturday Night and Sunday Morning as an influence, specifically its line "Why don't you take me where it's lively and there's plenty of people?"

== Release ==
Due to a dispute between the Smiths and its record label Rough Trade Records after the group completed The Queen Is Dead, nine months passed after the release of "The Boy with the Thorn in His Side" before the group issued another single. Once the matter was resolved, Rough Trade owner Geoff Travis felt that "There Is a Light That Never Goes Out" should be the band's "comeback" record. Despite Travis's advocation of the song, Simon Goddard expressed doubt that the song's "explicit glamorisation of suicide" would have endeared it to daytime radio. Additionally, Johnny Marr was insistent that "Bigmouth Strikes Again" be the band's next single. Marr stated:

For a long time I worked on the premise that we should always have a song on each album that people said, 'That should be a single.' But in fact really wasn't. 'Reel Around the Fountain' was that for the first album and 'There Is a Light That Never Goes Out' for The Queen Is Dead.

Morrissey affirmed Marr's position, commenting, "We did want 'Bigmouth Strikes Again'. I suppose it should have been followed by 'There Is a Light That Never Goes Out' but by then we'd written 'Panic' and we were very eager to have it thrown out into the pop wilderness."

Regardless, "There Is a Light That Never Goes Out" became the second Smiths song to top BBC Radio 1 disc jockey John Peel's Festive Fifty poll in his 1986 tally. The song was shortly thereafter included on the band's compilation album The World Won't Listen (1987). On 12 October 1992, "There Is a Light That Never Goes Out" finally received a single release by WEA to promote the ...Best II compilation. The song reached number 25 on the UK Singles Chart, making it their last UK Top 40 appearance to date.

== Critical reception ==
Professional ratings
Review scores
| Source | Rating |
|---|---|
| AllMusic | 3/5 stars |

Music critics consider "There Is a Light That Never Goes Out" to be one of the Smiths' finest songs. Simon Goddard wrote, "In a straw poll among Smiths fans today, 'There Is a Light That Never Goes Out' would more than likely still come out victorious", which he credits to the "perfect balance" of Marr's compositional skills and Morrissey's lyricism. AllMusic's Tim DiGravina calls it "a standout among standouts from the Smiths' masterpiece third album, The Queen Is Dead." In 2014, NME listed "There Is a Light That Never Goes Out" as the 12th-greatest song of all time. In 2017, Rob Sheffield of Rolling Stone placed the song number one in his ranking of 73 songs by the Smiths.

Marr commented on the song's enduring popularity: "I didn't realise that 'There Is a Light That Never Goes Out' was going to be an anthem, but, when we first played it, I thought it was the best song I'd ever heard."

== Track listings ==
All lyrics are written by Morrissey; all music is composed by Johnny Marr.

7-inch vinyl record (released in France, 1987)
| No. | Title | Length |
|---|---|---|
| 1. | "There Is a Light That Never Goes Out" | 4:02 |
| 2. | "Half a Person" | 3:36 |
| Total length: | | 7:38 |

7-inch vinyl record and cassette single (1992)
| No. | Title | Length |
|---|---|---|
| 1. | "There Is a Light That Never Goes Out" | 4:02 |
| 2. | "Handsome Devil" (live) | 2:55 |
| Total length: | | 6:57 |

CD 1 (1992)
| No. | Title | Length |
|---|---|---|
| 1. | "There Is a Light That Never Goes Out" | 4:02 |
| 2. | "Hand in Glove" (live) | 2:48 |
| 3. | "Some Girls Are Bigger Than Others" (live) | 5:03 |
| 4. | "Money Changes Everything" | 4:41 |
| Total length: | | 15:94 |

CD 2 (1992)
| No. | Title | Length |
|---|---|---|
| 1. | "There Is a Light That Never Goes Out" | 4:02 |
| 2. | "Hand in Glove" (with Sandie Shaw) | 2:58 |
| 3. | "I Don't Owe You Anything" (with Sandie Shaw) | 4:06 |
| 4. | "Jeane" (with Sandie Shaw) | 2:52 |
| Total length: | | 13:18 |

== Personnel ==
Personnel taken from The Queen Is Dead liner notes, except where noted.

The Smiths

- Morrissey – vocals
- Johnny Marr – guitars, sampler (string and flute sounds)
- Andy Rourke – bass guitar
- Mike Joyce – drums

== Charts ==
=== The Smiths version ===
| Chart (1992–1993) | Peak position |
|---|---|
| Australia (ARIA) | 176 |
| Ireland (IRMA) | 22 |
| UK Singles (Official Charts) | 25 |

=== Morrissey version ===
All entries charted with "Redondo Beach".

| Chart (2005) | Peak position |
|---|---|
| Ireland (IRMA) | 45 |
| Scottish Singles Sales (Official Charts) | 15 |
| UK Singles (Official Charts) | 11 |
| UK Independent (Official Charts) | 1 |

== Certifications ==
| Region | Certification | Certified units/sales |
|---|---|---|
| Italy (FIMI) | Gold | 35,000^{‡} |
| Spain (Promusicae) | Gold | 30,000^{‡} |
| United Kingdom (BPI) | 2× Platinum | 1,200,000^{‡} |
^{‡} Sales+streaming figures based on certification alone.

== In popular culture ==
There is a chapter in Irvine Welsh's novel Trainspotting (1993) named after this song, which mentions its title directly. It is also referenced in Enrico Brizzi's novel of the same year, Jack Frusciante Has Left the Band, and the author has stated the song encapsulates the story of the two main characters. The song appears on the soundtrack to 500 Days of Summer (2009); in the film (at first in a scene when Tom (Joseph Gordon-Levitt) met Summer (Zooey Deschanel) in an elevator), it is used to bring the main characters together. It is briefly sung by some of the main cast of Gavin & Stacey during a barbecue in Season 3. It is also played at the end of David Fincher's film The Killer (2023), which features many songs from The Smiths.
