= Attack Records =

Attack Records is a British record label, ran originally from 1969 to 1980 as an imprint of Trojan Records. Notable artists included The Pioneers, Gregory Isaacs, I-Roy, Big Youth and The Upsetters.

In 2003 it was revived for British singer Morrissey and the label Sanctuary Records, to persuade him to release his comeback album, You Are the Quarry with Sanctuary, despite the singer feeling that the name Sanctuary was inappropriate. Artists on the Attack roster included Morrissey, Nancy Sinatra, Jobriath and Kristeen Young. Morrissey's 2004 album, You Are the Quarry has sold in excess of 700,000 copies for the label.

In 2007, Sanctuary was sold to Universal, with Morrissey shifting to Decca Records. His last record under Attack was a partnership with Lost Highway Records in the US for the release of Years of Refusal, as he had earlier left Decca in the US due to its "poor promotion" of his 2008 Greatest Hits. Following this time, he was left without a record label worldwide (akin to the period of his career between 1997 and 2004). Morrissey later signed to Capitol in 2014.

== See also ==
- List of record labels
- List of independent UK record labels
