= Hulmerist =

Video by Morrissey
- Released: 1990
- Genre: Alternative rock
- Length: 46:23 minutes
- Label: EMI
- Director: Tim Broad

Morrissey chronology
Hulmerist (1990)	Live in Dallas (1992)

Hulmerist is a VHS and DVD release that includes seven promotional films for songs by Morrissey, released initially on VHS, in 1990, and then on DVD in 2004. It was certified Gold by the RIAA on 18 January 1991.

The title refers to Morrissey's childhood home in Hulme, Manchester. The L is silent (it's pronounced "hyoom"), so "Hulmerist" sounds like "humourist".

== Track listing ==
1. "The Last of the Famous International Playboys"
2. "Sister I'm a Poet"
3. "Everyday Is Like Sunday"
4. "Interesting Drug"
5. "Suedehead"
6. "Ouija Board, Ouija Board"
7. "November Spawned a Monster"
