= Andrew McGibbon =

English comedian and musician (born 1961)

Andrew Paresi
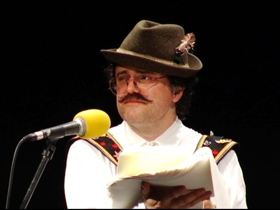
- Recording 'Not Today, Thank You' at the Cochrane Theatre, July 2007

Background information
- Born: Andrew McGibbon; 1961 (age 64–65); Chiswick
- Occupations: Comedian; actor; writer; musician; composer
- Instrument: Drums
- Years active: 1980–present
- Spouse: Tanya Sarne (m. 2015)

Andrew McGibbon (a.k.a. Andrew Paresi; born 1961 in Chiswick) is an English comedian, actor, writer, musician and composer. He has also produced and directed extensively, chiefly for radio.

== Early life, family, and education ==
Andrew is the fifth of six children (five brothers and a last-born sister) born to Gillian (née Peddar) and James McGibbon (1916-2004, Catholic educationalist, educational psychologist, writer, journalist, and editor). The couple married after meeting during the Second World War in the Middle East after encounters in Cairo, where James had travelled with the Eighth Army and been present at El Alamein, including serving with the Black Watch and various other regiments (rising through the ranks to become sergeant major), and in Palestine, where Gillian served with the WAC.

After Andrew did his initial studies at St Edmund's Primary, Whitton, and at Salesian College, he attended Richmond Tertiary College. It was here that he learnt to play the drums, his chief instrument. In 1980, despite thinking about attending Berklee School of Music, he left college to forge a career as a working musician.

== Music career ==
McGibbon initially associated himself closely with the London jazz scene, often rehearsing with Django Bates. However, he failed to make a significant impact, peaking with a performance alongside Lou Donaldson at Ronnie Scott's Jazz Club on 22 March 1982.

The name Paresi was adopted around this time on the advice of his then girlfriend, who had found that it was an Italian medical term for embolism. "There was something appealing about naming myself after a heart attack", he remembers. "Some sort of post-punk bollocks, I guess, which meant a lot to me back in 1982".

His first big break came on 7 November 1984 with an appearance on Tyne Tees children's pop show Razzamatazz as the drummer in Jim Diamond's band. Given the success of his number one hit I Should Have Known Better, a subsequent appearance by Paresi on Top of the Pops was expected, but Diamond's regular drummer Simon Kirke resumed his place in the band.

Paresi soon built a reputation for his drum programming work, and working relationships with a number of record producers developed. David Motion secured Paresi's percussive abilities for Love in a World Gone Mad and I Used to Love the Radio, recorded during the sessions for Bucks Fizz's 1986 album Writing on the Wall. He also worked with Motion on One Way, an album by europopglam band Rok-Etz recently augmented by Sal Solo of Classix Nouveaux. That same year the drummer encountered Stephen Street, who mixed a single by A Pair of Blue Eyes, a short-lived CBS band to whom Paresi was assigned.

The Street connection would lead to regular work with Morrissey, immediately following the demise of The Smiths in 1987. Paresi was regular drummer on albums Viva Hate and Kill Uncle as well as the Bona Drag sessions, lasting until the singer songwriter's sharp change of direction into rockabilly in 1992. This period of Paresi's career would later be chronicled in a BBC Radio 4 documentary, I Was Morrissey's Drummer (2005), as well as a number of related articles.

Paresi joined Bleed in 1994, an agitating feminist group famed for their anti-pornography single It Makes Money, for which they sent "faxes to various music and mainstream press publications plus top-shelf sex magazines" highlighting the industry's abuses of women. Despite an association with Stephen Street, by then producing Blur, the group struggled to find an audience and split in 1997.

More recent musical activities include drum duties on the 2010 album by Franc Cinelli, who performs under the Good Times, Good Times moniker. The record, also called Good Times, Good Times, was produced by Danton Supple and released on his label, Definition Sounds.

== Local radio ==
In parallel to his music career, McGibbon maintained a keen interest in performing comedy and found regular work as a fake caller on Clive Bull's late-night LBC show, beginning in 1986. There, he developed the character of Ned Sherrin soundalike Rodway of Belgravia, a man trapped with his mother and in unrequited love with the girl at his local gardening shop. Shortly before Christmas 1987 he faked the murder of a turkey live on air, provoking several complaints. Another character was Eric the Gardener, a Wiltshireman inclined to speak in gnomic, poetic utterances and non-sequiturs. There was also Vini of Vauxhall (based on musician Vini Reilly) and Ron, an estate dweller constantly having to calm his dogs – Sultan and Khan – during calls to the show. The last of these was a direct influence on a character in BBC Radio 4's phone-in parody Down the Line with Gary Bellamy. Its creators have freely admitted on Front Row that Bull's show was in their minds when making the series, having been regular listeners during the late 1980s.

== Self-released singles ==
Shortly after ending his period in the Morrissey band, Andrew McGibbon released two records of his own.

The first was '"Princess" by Blu Gene featuring Spider Johnson, a ragga single which used extracts from the Princess Diana Squidgygate tape as answering phrases in a love song. Annie Nightingale played it heavily but the record was otherwise outlawed by Radio 1, despite the creation of a toned-down radio edit.

This was followed by "I Live in a Giant Mushroom", a novelty trance single by McGibbon disguised as LBC character Eric the Gardener. The record secured daytime play on Steve Wright in the Afternoon on BBC Radio 1, where the presenter predicted it would be a Christmas hit. In the event, it failed to chart. Issued on Mental Temple, McGibbon's own label, it was mixed and produced by Danton Supple who would later produce Coldplay. A song on the Divine Comedy album Fin de Siecle was named in tribute to Eric.

== Kevin Greening ==
A significant working relationship was forged between McGibbon and GLR disc jockey Kevin Greening around the time that he moved to Virgin Radio in April 1993. Greening's interest was piqued by the Eric the Gardener record, desperate to know if the character was real or make believe. McGibbon was soon contributing sketch material to the show. Additional characters in these early days included Welworth Moore, David van Donkin, Inspector Steeping of Scotland Yard, Raymond Sinclair and Creighton Wheeler.

Transferring to BBC Radio 1 in January 1994, Greening initially fronted the weekend breakfast show, moving to lunchtimes between November 1994 and October 1995. Fixtures during this period include a regular two-part story from Eric the Gardener and three adverts per show by Raymond Sinclair's insalubrious associates Blo Chap. Musical departures comprised the work of the Sinclair Singers, a satirical four-part jazz harmony group again mixed and produced by Danton Supple, as well as a parody of Morrissey smuggled in during guest host slots for Simon Mayo and known in fan circles as Oh Melanie.

McGibbon was sacked from the show upon the move back to weekend breakfast in October 1995, although he returned to assist during the depleted airtime available in Greening's drive time slot from February – October 1997.

October 1997 saw the partnering of Greening with Zoë Ball for the Radio 1 breakfast show, which lasted just one year. Here, McGibbon debuted Major Holdups, a terrifying former air pilot prone to barking out travel updates intercut with surreal storylines. These items were co-written with Rob Colley. This period also saw the return of Raymond Sinclair in the regular item Ray's Organ.

With a move to Sundays in September 1998, McGibbon was dropped once again from Greening's show. A final edition on 16 January 2000 comprised a nostalgic look back at old sketch material, ending with a swansong appearance by Eric the Gardener.

== The Nimmo Twins ==
McGibbon briefly performed as the third member of The Nimmo Twins, a sketch troupe formed in 1996 by Owen Evans and Karl Minns. Augmenting the team from the spring of 1999, their third Edinburgh show premiered in August at the Pleasance and was well received. In a five-star review by the Scotland on Sunday newspaper, it was written that

you never know where their comedy is coming from. It sneaks up behind you and bites without warning. Whether it's a skit about Chaucer having his prologue, having The Canterbury Tales rejected on account of the spelling mistakes, or a killingly funny analysis of the abysmal acting common to crime reconstructions, The Nimmo Twins hit the comedy bulls eye like Tyson hits his unfortunate opponents. It's anarchic, off-the-wall and eye-poppingly innovative.

By the time of their 2000 radio series, McGibbon had left to pursue his own projects.

== Creighton Wheeler ==
Creighton Wheeler, a character created by McGibbon during his time with Kevin Greening, has enjoyed the longest life of any of his characters. A sufferer of splicer's disease, words and phrases are skipped as he speaks, thus creating conjunctions made out of fragments from unrelated words. The conceit grew out of the parodies of radio ads featuring Raymond Sinclair on – initially – Greening's Virgin show, where crude tape edits breathlessly cut from one sentence to another, often losing syllabic sounds. McGibbon could eventually mimic this naturally and, with the tilt of a cut-glass accent broadly based on art critic Brian Sewell, a new character emerged.

Wheeler diversified from the Greening show with regular appearances on Loose Ends, on which McGibbon had first met The Nimmo Twins. Live performances followed as part of their Edinburgh show, as did a variation on the character for an episode of Vic Reeves and Bob Mortimer's revival of Randall & Hopkirk.

Two series for BBC Radio 4 aired in 2003. Wheeler's Fortune and Wheeler's Wonders were narrated by Brian Hayes and explored the character's Zelig-like presence in cultural history. Jon Snow, Bernard Cribbins, David Frost, Brian Sewell, Ned Sherrin and Michael Winner were amongst his deadpan witnesses. A rave review followed courtesy of Gillian Reynolds of The Daily Telegraph, who claimed it had "made me whoop, yell and fall out of bed laughing." Applauding an arts show parody called 'Art, Art, Art, Art', she continued "We have all heard parodies of television arts shows. We have all experienced arts shows that are beyond parody. This one was both spot on and deliciously off. Hayes linked it with the dignity of Kenneth Horne encountering Julian and Sandy."

== Early sitcoms ==
Having developed a taste for narrative comedy with the exploits of Tony Meringue on the Kevin Greening show, McGibbon soon wrote a number of half-hour comedies for BBC Radio 4.

Routemasters (1999) was his debut sitcom, telling the tale of a time travelling art thief. It had echoes of The Hitchhiker's Guide to the Galaxy. The series starred The Nimmo Twins and LA Law actress Amanda Donohoe. It represented her official radio debut, excluding a number of incognito appearances in various sketches for Greening. Speaking to the Radio Times, she said that "I suppose I'm an intergalactic dominatrix. There are great humorous possibilities – like painting the ceiling of the Sistine Chapel with white emulsion. In the end we discover Hildegard's rather tawdry past and motives." The series was written by McGibbon (who also played Raymond) with additional material by Rob Colley and Kevin Greening. Later BBC7 transmissions were cut to remove a subplot about castration.

Two series of I Think I've Got a Problem (2001–03) followed and were similarly fantastical. The sitcom was a musical about Tom Caine, a man with a band living inside his head. It was co-written with Nick Romero and starred Suggs (of the band Madness), Bob Monkhouse, McGibbon and Romero. Bill Nighy and Julia Deakin joined for the second series. The considerable amount of musical content was jointly composed by McGibbon, Romero and Suggs. Matthew Bannister described it as "Pennies from Heaven on acid". Gillian Reynolds summed it up as an "inventive commentary on humanity, cruelty, folly and the chaos of consciousness, all done in the style of a comic strip. It is original, bold [and] amazingly brilliant."

Dead Man Talking (2001) was a four-part series produced by Wise Buddah, again for BBC Radio 4. The format was a chat show in which John Bird probed famous people from history, all long since dead, amongst them Adam & Eve, Boudicca & Joan of Arc and Mary Shelley & Robert Oppenheimer. The series featured Fiona Allen, Jon Culshaw, John Sessions and Tony Slattery.

Andrew McGibbon also made regular appearances in Tom Jamieson & Nev Fountain's Elephants to Catch Eels (2003–04), a sitcom about eighteenth century Cornish smugglers. In it he played Captain Marriot and the series ran for two series of six episodes. It co-starred Lucy Speed, John Bowe, Cameron Stewart, Martin Hyder, Julia Deakin and Mark Felgate, with Sheridan Smith joining for series two. It was produced by Jan Ravens.

== Curtains for Radio ==
Initially partnered with Testbed Productions for the Wheeler's Fortune and Wheeler's Wonders series, the company Curtains for Radio was established in 2002 by McGibbon, Romero and Jonathan Ruffle. Its work has mainly been in radio comedy and features, although it has recently branched out into film.

CFR's first entirely independent production was Kington's Anatomy of Comedy (2005), a three-part series on the mechanics of comedy presented by Miles Kington. It was followed by Miles Apart (2006), three extended interviews with comedy practitioners in other cultures – Antoine de Caunes in France, Sabina Guzzanti in Italy, and Harry Shearer in America. All were co-produced by McGibbon and Romero.

I Was Morrissey's Drummer (2005) was the first in a sequence of profiles of people who once worked with great artists. McGibbon himself was the initial subject. Two short series of I Was... followed in 2007 and 2008, with reflections from those close to Douglas Adams, Ernest Hemingway, David Lean, Dudley Moore, Sam Peckinpah and Peter Sellers.

Not Today, Thank You (2006), a peak-time sitcom written by Andrew McGibbon and Nick Romero, cast Brian Hayes as a washed-up radio presenter forced to live in his grandmother's house with her six eccentric tenants. The series also featured Harry Shearer, Sheridan Smith, Mark Perry, Alex Lowe, McGibbon and Romero. It was poorly received by many critics, including Gareth McLean of The Guardian who was moved to describe it as "the worst programme on the network".

Reality is an Illusion Caused by Lack of N.F. Simpson (2007) was a verbosely titled return to documentary, in which presenter David Quantick chronicled the life of the absurdist playwright. A 'work in progress' version for television was premiered at BFI Southbank in May 2008, representing the first visual production by Curtains for Radio.

Single Files (2007–08) was a dating agency sitcom by Mark Trotman and Chris Tisdall. It starred Jo Joyner, Mark Heap, Sarah Hadland, Giles New, Julia Deakin and Bruce MacKinnon. The series was produced by Andrew McGibbon, Nick Romero and Lianne Coop.

A bi-media production, The Cornwell Estate (2008–10), depicted the lives of four characters played by Phil Cornwell. Devised, written and directed by Andrew McGibbon, the first two radio episodes were the soundtracks of on-location films streamed by BBC Interactive. The remaining two episodes were standard studio productions for BBC Radio 4. Reviews were excellent, with Gillian Reynolds dubbing it "a bright new series... a very good cast, good production and sharp script make it both real and surreal.". A second series followed in 2010.

In 2013, Curtains for Radio expanded their website to include a guest blog written by a variety of contributors.

== I Was book ==
Compiled from research for the earlier radio series, as well as drawing on interviews with seven new subjects, I Was Douglas Adams's Flatmate, and Other Encounters with Legends was published by Faber and Faber in 2011. Many reviews commented on its eclecticism, with Tim Walker of The Independent describing it as "a bizarrely versatile toilet book". Iain Finlayson of The Times predicted it would "stand up as entertaining primary source material for future biographies". Writing in The Word magazine, Mark Hodkinson added that, in his view, "the chapters on civil rights lawyer Clive Stafford Smith and Valerie Danby Smith, Ernest Hemingway's former secretary, are solid pieces of reportage." The Big Issue added that "McGibbon's comic timing and affection for his subject matter makes it a lot of fun."

To promote the release of the book, The Independent on Sunday published extracts. McGibbon also gave a number of interviews.

== The Pickerskill Reports ==
A significant coup for CFR saw The Pickerskill Detentions (2005) mark the first radio performance in twenty years by Ian Richardson, playing the retired English master of Haunchurst College for Boys. In the series he reflected on his most memorable detentions. The series also featured Phil Cornwell, Martin Hyder, Dominic Hawksley and Nick Romero, and was written and directed by Andrew McGibbon. The series was widely acclaimed, with Ruth Cowen of The Sunday Express describing it as "bizarre and very funny" and Chris Campling of The Times noting how "Andrew McGibbon's stories about a teacher with an unusual, moralistic attitude towards justice are a good example of that gentle humour which suddenly throws in a wobbly that pulls you up short."

In part due to Richardson's death in 2007, plans for a television transfer were abandoned. However, a radio sequel – The Pickerskill Reports – aired on BBC Radio 4 in four parts from 28 August 2009. It starred Ian McDiarmid in the Pickerskill role, with support by Thomas Brodie Sangster, Tony Gardner and Philip Madoc. Moira Petty of The Stage praised it by saying that "Ian McDiarmid has stepped brilliantly into the central role." Gillian Reynolds of The Sunday Telegraph, reviewing the second series in 2011, called it "scorchingly funny". This second series added Sheridan Smith to the cast.

A concluding special, Dr Henry Pickerskill: The Final Report was transmitted in 2013, this time with Elaine Cassidy and Mark Heap in guest roles. The script editors were Nick Romero and David Quantick and a report on its recording was streamed online.

== Personal life ==
McGibbon is married to fashion designer and entrepreneur Tanya Sarne.

== Discography and sessions ==
- Bucks Fizz: Writing on the Wall (album) [drums; 1986]
- Rok-Etz: One Way (album) [drums; 1986]
- Sandie Shaw: Hello Angel (album) [drums; 1988]
- Sandie Shaw (John Peel Session) [drums; BBC Radio 1, 5 December 1988]
- Morrissey: "Suedehead" (single) [drums, 1988]
- Morrissey: Viva Hate (album) [drums, 1988]
- Morrissey: "Everyday Is Like Sunday" (single) [drums, 1988]
- Morrissey: "Ouija Board, Ouija Board" (single) [drums; 1989]
- My Bloody Valentine: Glider (extended play) [additional programming; 1990]
- Morrissey: "November Spawned a Monster" (single) [drums; 1990]
- Morrissey: "Piccadilly Palare" (single) [drums; 1990]
- Morrissey: Bona Drag (compilation) [programming/drums; 1990]
- Morrissey: "Our Frank" (single) [drums; 1991]
- Morrissey: Kill Uncle (album) [programming/drums; 1991]
- Morrissey: "Sing Your Life" (single) [drums; 1991]
- Morrissey: "Pregnant for the Last Time" (single) [drums; 1991]
- Morrissey: "My Love Life" (single) [drums; 1991]
- Flowered Up [programming; 1991 – 1992]
- The Rockingbirds [programming; 1991 – 1992]
- Blu Gene featuring Spider Johnson: "Princess" (single) [composer; 1992]
- Eric the Gardener: "I Live in a Giant Mushroom" (single) [composer; 1992]
- The Black Velvet Band: King of Myself [drums on selected tracks; 1992]
- Various Artists: Peace Together [drum programming on "Be Still"; 1993]
- Bleed: The Good Times Are Killing Me (album) [drums; 1995]
- Bleed: "It Makes Money" (single) [drums; 1995]
- Bleed: Action Man (album) [drums; 1995]
- Bleed: "All Breakages Must Be Paid For" (single) [drums; 1996]
- Good Times, Good Times: Good Times, Good Times (album) [drums; 2010]

== Radio ==
- Clive Bull [regular; LBC, 1986 – 1988]
- Kevin Greening [writer/performer; Virgin FM/Radio 1, 1993–2000]
- The Treatment [performer; BBC Radio 5]
- Room For Improvement [columnist; BBC Radio 4, 1998]
- Loose Ends [as Creighton Wheeler; BBC Radio 4, 1998 – 2003]
- Routemasters [writer; BBC Radio 4, 8 – 29 September 1999]
- Word of Mouth [columnist; BBC Radio 4, 1999 – 2000]
- The Routes of English: Language at Play [columnist; BBC Radio 4, 24 August 2000]
- Steve Wright in the Afternoon [performer; BBC Radio 2, 8 February 2001]
- Steve Wright in the Afternoon [performer; BBC Radio 2, 10 July 2001]
- I Think I've Got A Problem series one [co-writer/co-producer/composer/actor, as Jake; BBC Radio 4, 11 July – 1 August 2001]
- Dead Man Talking [writer; BBC Radio 4, 25 October – 15 November 2001]
- Doctor Who: Death Comes to Time [as Captain Carne; BBC Online, 14 February – 22 March 2002]
- Steve Wright in the Afternoon [performer; BBC Radio 2, 26 February 2002]
- Steve Wright in the Afternoon [performer; BBC Radio 2, 18 July 2002]
- Wheeler's Fortune [writer/performer/co-producer; BBC Radio 4, 16 January – 6 February 2003]
- Elephants to Catch Eels series one [as Captain Marriot; BBC Radio 4, 12 February – 19 March 2003]
- I Think I've Got A Problem series two [co-writer/co-producer/composer/actor, as Jake; BBC Radio 4, 27 March – 17 April 2003]
- Wheeler's Wonders [writer/performer/co-producer; BBC Radio 4, 26 November – 17 December 2003]
- Elephants to Catch Eels series two [as Captain Marriot; BBC Radio 4, 20 April – 25 May 2004]
- Kington's Anatomy of Comedy [co-producer; BBC Radio 4, 8 – 22 March 2005]
- The Pickerskill Detentions [writer/director/co-producer; BBC Radio 4, 13 July – 3 August 2005]
- One Way Single Parent Family Favourites [guest; Resonance 104.4 FM, 2005]
- Phill Jupitus [guest; BBC 6 Music, October 2005]
- I Was Morrissey's Drummer [writer/presenter; BBC Radio 4, 13 October 2005]
- Miles Apart [co-producer; BBC Radio 4; 17 – 31 August 2006]
- Not Today, Thank You [writer/director/co-producer/actor; BBC Radio 4, 22 August – 26 September 2006]
- Reality is an Illusion Caused by Lack of N.F. Simpson [producer; BBC Radio 4, 5 April 2007]
- Salford Lad [speaker; BBC Radio 2, 21–28 April 2007]
- I Was... series one [writer/presenter; BBC Radio 4, 21 – 28 August 2007]
- Loose Ends [guest; BBC Radio 4, 25 August 2007]
- Pick of the Week [presenter; BBC Radio 4, 23 September 2007]
- Single Files [co-producer; BBC Radio 4, 18 December 2007 – 8 January 2008]
- The Morricone Affair [speaker; BBC Radio 4, 1 November 2008]
- I Was... series two [writer/presenter/co-producer; BBC Radio 4, 2 – 23 December 2008]
- The Cornwell Estate series one [co-creator/writer/director/co-producer/actor (various roles); BBC Radio 4, 17 December 2008 – 14 January 2009]
- The Pickerskill Reports series one [writer/director/co-producer; BBC Radio 4, 28 August – 18 September 2009]
- A Cymbal Tale [writer/presenter; BBC Radio 4, 10 November 2009]
- Rory Bremner's International Satirists [producer; BBC Radio 4, 8–22 March 2010]
- The Cornwell Estate series two [co-creator/writer/director/co-producer/actor (various roles); BBC Radio 4, 26 October – 1 December 2010]
- The Pickerskill Reports series two [writer/director/co-producer; BBC Radio 4, 27 July – 17 August 2011]
- With Nobbs On [producer; BBC Radio 4, 21 May – 4 June 2012]
- Dr Henry Pickerskill: The Final Report [writer/director/co-producer; BBC Radio 4, 27 May 2013]

== Screen work ==
- Razzamatazz [drummer; Tyne Tees, 7 November 1984]
- Rocksteady [drummer; HTV, 27 August 1985]
- MTV – Up for It Live [regular; MTV Europe, 1997 – 1998]
- Electric Circus [behind the scenes on Radio 1 breakfast show; BBC 2, 17 October 1997]
- Edinburgh Nights [with The Nimmo Twins; BBC 2, August 1999]
- Randall & Hopkirk: The Best Years of Your Death [as Waymark; BBC 1, 1 April 2000]
- That Was the Week That Was [untransmitted reunion special, December 2002]
- Dee Time [as Creighton Wheeler; Channel 4, 29 December 2003]
- Newsnight [behind the scenes on Not Today, Thank You; BBC 2, 25 July 2006]
- Reality is an Illusion Caused by Lack of N.F. Simpson [director; 2008]
- The Cornwell Estate [video material to accompany first two radio episodes; BBC Interactive, 17 – 24 December 2008]
- Dr Henry Pickerskill: The Final Report [promotional film, 2013]

== Miscellaneous stage work ==
- Deep Purple [live programming, 1991]
- The Nimmo Twins [member, 1999; including Edinburgh Fringe Festival]
- 2 Drummers Drumming [guest performer, Edinburgh Fringe Festival, August 2008]

== Published writing ==
- Dazed & Confused: T#2 The Beat [undated; p24-5]
- Q Special Edition – 'The Smiths & Morrissey: I Was Morrissey's Drummer! And Other Tales' [p88-90; 2004]
- The Guardian – tribute to Kevin Greening
- I Was Douglas Adams's Flatmate: and Other Encounters with Legends [author; Faber and Faber, 2011]
