= The Nimmo Twins =

Comedy duo Owen Evans and Karl Minns

The Nimmo Twins are a British comedy double act, consisting of Owen Evans and Karl Minns. Formed in Norwich in 1996, they came to national attention after their show Posh Spice Nude became a sell-out success at the 1997 Edinburgh Festival, and they appeared regularly on Radio 4's Loose Ends programme with Ned Sherrin. The duo returned to Edinburgh in 1998 and 1999, and have performed internationally.

== Background ==
Owen Evans was raised in Cromer and attended the London Academy of Music and Dramatic Art (LAMDA) where he studied with the Moscow Arts Theatre school. As an actor, he has appeared in innumerable plays and theatre productions. He has also appeared in television adverts for Daewoo Cars, NatWest, Ikea, and Flora.

As a stand-up comedian, Karl Minns won the Daily Telegraph Open Mic Award in 2001 and performed at the Montreal and Melbourne Comedy Festivals before returning to Edinburgh in 2002 in Comedy Clone with Nina Conti and Patrick Monaghan. The Nimmo Twins then became the face of Adnams in Norfolk in TV radio and billboard adverts for two years.

Minns has written plays, comedies, and musicals for both stage and radio. As a television writer he has written for Karen Taylor, Laura Solon, and Phil Nichol. He wrote the TV sitcom pilot Moonmonkeys starring Karl Theobald and Dan Antopoloski. He also wrote a weekly column for the Norwich Evening News from 2002 to 2007. He was awarded the EDF Regional Columnist of The Year in January 2007. He was also nominated for the Press Gazette Media Awards Regional Columnist of the year in the same year.

Minns wrote the show Mouth to Mouth, for BBC3, a series of six interlinking monologues, whose stories intersected until the whole overall story was told. The Stage described it as an "intricately-plotted love hexagon... superb and understated".

As a writer and performer, Minns has also contributed to two series of Russell Howard's Good News on BBC3, credited as Programme Associate alongside Dan Atkinson and Steve Williams. The first series aired in winter 2009, the second series ran from March to May 2010. Minns is also credited as a writer for the 2020 revival of Spitting Image.

Minns has also written material for Charlie Brooker, Unspun with Matt Forde and Al Murray the Pub Landlord, among others.

== Career ==
The Twins got their start with the Crude Apache Theatre Company. After their 1997 Edinburgh Festival show they made appearances on BBC One's Stand Up Show.

The Nimmo Twins briefly expanded to a trio in 1999 with the introduction of Andrew McGibbon, who performed with them during the spring and summer of that year.

The first Radio 4 comedy series The Nimmo Twins in... was broadcast in 2000 on BBC 7. Episodes included: A Stiff Upper Lip - a tale of a Victorian era gentleman without a beard; and Lord of the Onion Rings - the tale of a Tolkien-obsessed man who works in a petrol station. Their second series, The Rapid Eye Movement, about the troupe of actors performing a man's nightly dreams, starred Martin Freeman, Chris Langham and Kevin Eldon. The show ran for three series until 2005. The second series was nominated for the Douglas Adams Award for Radio Comedy in 2003.

== Live shows ==
In their native Norfolk, Evans and Minns are best known for their yearly sketch show, Normal for Norfolk, which in ten years grew from a pub show to a performance at the Norwich Playhouse, playing to over 4,500 people over the 2005 Christmas season. Their 20th anniversary show in 2016 was seen by over 17,000 people.

In the early hours of 14 December 2007, Karl Minns was attacked while walking home after a performance at the city's Playhouse. He was badly injured, suffering a broken arm and fractured skull. As a result, their remaining shows for the year were cancelled.

=== Normal for Norfolk shows ===
- Normal for Norfolk (1996)
- Normal for Norfolk 2 (1997) - "The Coypu Strikes Back"
- Normal for Norfolk 3 (1998) - "The Return of the Jed"
- Normal for Norfolk 4 (1999) - "The Fakenham Menace"
- Normal for Norfolk 5 (2000)
- Normal for Norfolk 6 (2001) - "A Tough Caister Crack"
- Normal for Norfolk 7 (2002) - "A Stewart White Christmas"
- Normal for Norfolk 8 (2003) - "Nickers Off Ready When I Come Home"
- Normal for Norfolk 9 (2004)
- Normal for Norfolk 10 (2005) - "Topless Mardling"
- Normal for Norfolk 11 (2007) - "Bat Out Of Hellesdon"
- Normal for Norfolk 12 (2014) - "Fritton's Got Talent"
- Normal for Norfolk 13 (2016) - "The Country Members"
- Normal for Norfolk xx (2022) - "Holt? Who Goes There?" (25th Anniversary Show)
- Normal for Norfolk xx (2023) - "Holt? We Went There!" (retrospective with new material tryouts for 2024)
- Normal for Norfolk xx (2024) - "If You Tolerate Diss, Then Your Children Will Be Next"
