= Tim Broad =

British music video director (1955–1993)

- Born: 1955; United Kingdom
- Died: 1993 (38 years old)
- Occupation: Music video director
- Years active: 1988-1993

Tim Broad (1955–1993) was a British music video director, best known for his work with the singer Morrissey.

In a 1990 interview, he was described as Morrissey's closest friend. Broad directed the video for The Smiths' songs "Girlfriend in a Coma" and "Stop Me If You Think You've Heard This One Before", and subsequently a number of videos for Morrissey, seven of which were released on the compilation Hulmerist.

He also directed the videos for the Mike + The Mechanics' songs "The Living Years" and "Nobody Knows", Marc Almond's "Tears Run Rings" and several songs by The Jesus and Mary Chain.

Broad died of an HIV-related illness in 1993 at the age of 38. He is listed on "The AIDS Memorial" Instagram page.

== Filmography: Music videos for Morrissey ==
- Suedehead (1988)
- Everyday Is Like Sunday (1988)
- The Last of the Famous International Playboys (1989)
- Interesting Drug (1989)
- Ouija Board, Ouija Board (1989)
- November Spawned a Monster (1990)
- Sing Your Life (1990)
- Pregnant for the Last Time (1991)
- My Love Life (1991)
- We Hate It When Our Friends Become Successful (1992)
- You're the One for Me, Fatty (1992)
