= Marquit =

Marquit is a surname. Notable people with the surname include:

- Deborah Marquit, American fashion designer
- Erwin Marquit (1926–2015), American physicist and Marxist philosopher
