= NFN =

NFN may refer to:

- Nafferton railway station (National Rail station code), England
- National Froebel Network, set up by the National Froebel Foundation
- Nepal Federatie Nederland, an advocacy organization for the relations between Nepal and the Netherlands
- NFN Open & Bloot, nudist recreation federation in the Netherlands
- "Normal for Norfolk", an example of medical slang
