= Iain Finlayson =

Iain Finlayson may refer to:

- Iain Finlayson (journalist)
- Iain Finlayson (alpine skier)
