= Hairdresser on Fire =

Song by Morrissey
- A-side: "Suedehead"
- Released: 15 February 1988
- Recorded: October – December 1987
- Genre: Alternative rock
- Length: 3:49
- Label: His Master's Voice (UK): Sire; Reprise (US)
- Songwriter(s): Morrissey; Stephen Street
- Producer(s): Stephen Street

Morrissey singles chronology
"Suedehead" / "Hairdresser on Fire" (1988)	"Everyday Is Like Sunday" (1989)

"Hairdresser on Fire" is a song by Morrissey, first released as a B-side to his debut solo single "Suedehead". Co-written by Morrissey and producer Stephen Street, the song features lyrics expressing Morrissey's frustration with being unable to see his hairdresser.

In addition to its appearance on the "Suedehead" single, "Hairdresser on Fire" has appeared on the American release of Morrissey's debut solo album Viva Hate, as well as his 1990 compilation album Bona Drag. Since its release, the song has seen critical acclaim for its jangly, string-inflected music and Morrissey's witty lyricism. It has since become a fan favorite, appearing on multiple compilation albums and as well as multiple iterations of Morrissey's live setlists.

== Background ==
"Hairdresser on Fire" was written by Morrissey and collaborator Stephen Street, with whom he would co-write multiple singles and the album Viva Hate. At the time of its release, the song was rumoured to have been inspired by the Joe Orton-Kenneth Halliwell piece The Boy Hairdresser or, alternatively, Manchester hairdresser and disc jockey Andrew Berry, who had been a friend of Morrissey and former Smiths guitarist Johnny Marr. Morrissey rejected these explanations in a 1988 interview, commenting: "No, it's just a very simple song about trying to get hold of a hairdresser."

Drummer Andrew Paresi, who performed on the track, recalled of the song's origins in a 2004 interview: "I think it did stem from a real incident. I think Morrissey had been to Toni & Guy and hadn't quite been shown enough respect. You can imagine all kinds of interesting hairstyling ideas being discussed over Morrissey's head as he sits mumbling, 'Well, actually, no, I just want to keep me quiff.'" Paresi further commented that he "always liked" the song.

== Release ==
"Hairdresser on Fire" was first released as one of the B-sides on the "Suedehead" single in February 1988. Morrissey's record label EMI liked the song and pushed for it to be included on Morrissey's subsequent studio album Viva Hate, but Morrissey and Street had decided on a track list already and refused to include the track. The song ultimately appeared on the North American release of Viva Hate as well as on the 1990 compilation album Bona Drag. In 2012, Street remarked that the song should have been included on that year's expanded re-release of Viva Hate, though Morrissey ultimately refused to include B-sides from the period on the reissue.

It has since appeared on compilation albums The CD Singles '88–91' and The Best of Morrissey. Morrissey has performed the song live sporadically since its release, including for the 2004 birthday concert featured in the film Who Put the M in Manchester?. He began performing the song live again during his 2018 tour, marking the first time he performed the song live since 2004.

== Critical reception ==
"Hairdresser on Fire" has seen critical acclaim since its release. Upon its release in 1988, the song was described by Sounds as "inspiring." In his 1990 review of Bona Drag, Stuart Maconie of the NME said the song was "right up there with the very best of The Smiths" and commented, "'Hairdresser' is perfect, from the warm lyricism of the string introduction to those great lines about 'busy scissors' - funny, tender and sad." In a retrospective review, The Quietus called the song "arguably the finest B-side of Morrissey's career."

Stereogum ranked it as Morrissey's sixth best solo song, writing, "The impeccably rendered character study 'Hairdresser on Fire' is the sort of thing one can only imagine Morrissey pulling off." The Chicago Tribune ranked the song as Morrissey's seventh best solo track, writing, "The only thing prettier than the strings on this song is the orchestra that is Morrissey's dulcet croon." Spin rated it his eleventh best, while The Guardian included the song in their unranked top ten Morrissey songs, stating, "For someone so routinely dismissed as a navel-gazing misanthrope, 'Hairdresser on Fire' is probably the greatest example of Moz poking fun at his own reputation as a harbinger of doom: it's intentionally ridiculous, the bathos of the grand, sweeping swings and chiming bells used to soundtrack a fusspot having kittens about his hair."
