= Tanya Sarne =

British fashion designer

- Born: Tania Gordon; 15 January 1945 (age 81); Southgate, North London
- Education: University of Sussex
- Occupation: Fashion Designer
- Years active: 1978-2017
- Labels: Miz (1978-1983); Ghost (1984-2006); Handwritten (2007-2013); Sarne (2014-2017)
- Spouses: Mike Sarne (m. 1969; div. 1986); Andrew McGibbon (m. 2015)
- Children: Claudia Sarne (b. 1970); William Sarne (b. 1971)

Tanya Sarne OBE (born Tania Gordon on 15 January 1945) is a fashion designer and entrepreneur. She originally gained fame in 1984 as the co-founder of the British label Ghost which went on to have international success for more than two decades and became known for its distinctive fabrics.

== Early life ==
Tanya Sarne was born to Romanian parents Jean-Claude (born 1920) and Daphne (born 1921), who both lived in London and met in an air raid shelter in Kensington Gardens in 1943. Her mother had studied at the London School of Economics and worked at BBC Overseas Service until 1952. Her father was employed at Reuters.

Sarne left school in 1963 and during a gap year busked with Andrew Loog Oldham, had an affair with Tony Booth, worked as a model for the Cherry Marshall agency (featuring in the Pathé film short Model School in Mayfair) and worked on the London party scene which brought her into the orbit of Michael Caine, Terence Stamp and Peter O’Toole.

She studied history and social psychology at the University of Sussex, Brighton (1964-1967). Her contemporaries included Virginia Wade. Sarne then went on to become a reader for Universal Pictures and briefly worked as an assistant to a literary agent.

In 1967, Sarne met her future husband Mike Sarne - formerly a pop star, and by now a film director. After their wedding in London on 15 January 1969, preparatory work on Myra Breckinridge took them to California. The Sarnes, having declined to stay as guests at the home of Roman Polanski and Sharon Tate, relocated to the nearby Malibu Colony. Fortuitously, this prevented them becoming embroiled in the Tate–LaBianca murders of August 1969 although Polanski, on his return to Los Angeles, grieved at the Sarnes’ home for several days.

The early 1970s took Sarne to Brazil, where she first became interested in developing affordable fashion. This was driven also by visits to Paris and New York trade fairs in the mid-1970s, and a very successful period selling alpaca jumpers from Peru. By 1978, she had co-created a UK-based range of fashion sportswear under the trade name Miz. The lines expanded to include trousers, scarf coats and jackets over the next five years. Sarne sold her share of the company in 1983.

== Ghost ==
Ghost, a fashion label whose signatures were bias cuts, asymmetry and viscose fabrics, came into existence following a conversation with Katharine Hamnett in early 1983. Its name was a play on the ghostwriter; in "We thought it would be interesting if no one knew who was behind the label."

The key initial collaborator was designer Andrea Sargeant, a recent graduate of Saint Martin's School of Art. As a small upstart Sarne and Sargeant elected to focus on new collections twice per year, with a first winter launch in 1984. The Olympia trade fair saw the debut of their summer collection and a new fabric which led to a 900% growth in sales. Their first retail location was a stand at Hyper-Hyper on Kensington High Street.

Ghost's first appearance at London Fashion Week in September 1985 spotlighted gender-neutral items. Its appeal also lay in being a 'mix-and-match, machine-washable designer collection'.

The Chapel on Kensal Road was bought as a new headquarters in August 1986, which would remain as Ghost's lasting commercial and production home. The following year, Sarne appointed Lynne Franks as their public relations manager.

A visit by Dawn French to The Chapel, where she met with Sarne and they were interrupted by daughter Claudia, is thought to be an inspiration for the French and Saunders sketch "Modern Mother and Daughter" first transmitted on 19 April 1990. This would later spawn Absolutely Fabulous. However, Franks is also thought to be an influence on the series’ main character Eddie Monsoon.

Ghost became distinctive for its eye-catching launch shows, which gradually became more elaborate and professionally produced and designed presentations. Sherald Lamden, Ken Flanagan and Debbie Mason made up the central production team from 1991 onwards. Their first show together featured pregnant models, in order to emphasise the ‘all shapes and sizes’ appeal of Ghost.

The shows would often demand a move away from traditional venues, and for this reason Ghost is credited with being instrumental in elevating the status of London Fashion Week.

Models who have featured in Ghost shows include Carla Bruni Naomi Campbell, Neneh Cherry, Amanda Donohoe, Kate Moss and Rachel Weisz.

Andrea Sargeant left Ghost in 1993 after a decade as head designer. Others hired by Sarne include James Logerfo (in 1990), Angela Southwell (1993-1996) and Sophia Malig (1993-2006).

In November 1993, Ghost was the first British label to exhibit at New York Fashion Week with Quentin Crisp as their featured guest. This show also marked the arrival of new producer Alex de Batak, who replaced Flanagan. There were thirteen New York shows in total, several of them scored by James Lavelle. Susanne Deeken, Nicholas Knightly and Alister Mackie took over show production from 1996, their successors including Amy Roberts in 2000 and Yong Fong in 2005.

Sarne established standalone Ghost shops, the first two opening in Hinde Street, Marylebone, in 1994, and on Ledbury Road, Notting Hill in 1997. A third shop opened in Los Angeles in 1998 on Robertson Boulevard, another in Paris in 2000 and a fifth in New York that same year. Concession stores opened at Selfridges and Harvey Nichols in 1998, with many others following.

A diversification into perfume was launched in September 2000. Sarne oversaw five fragrances over the next three years. The first two - The Fragrance, Deep Night - are still in production and are owned by Procter & Gamble.

Sarne sold a stake in Ghost to the Arev group in 2005, although her position as managing director was soon challenged. She exited the company, along with most of its staff, and the name Ghost was eventually sold to Touker Suleyman.

== Later projects ==
After a sabbatical year, Sarne returned to fashion with a new label devised with Sophia Malig, Neil Smith and Gary Graham. This was Handwritten, launched in 2007, and which continued the use of bias cuts and asymmetry that had been central to Ghost. It folded in 2013.

Sarne gave her own surname to her next fashion label, launched in 2014. This collaboration was with former Ghost shows producer Sherald Lamden. The Sarne label lasted three years.

== Personal life ==
Sarne's first marriage, to Mike Sarne, broke down in the late 1970s. They did not formally divorce until 1986, by which time they had been separated for seven years.

Sarne has five grandchildren.

Andrew McGibbon, a musician, and later comedy writer and documentary maker, met Sarne in 1991 and bought the flat above her so they could create a home in 1995. They were engaged in 2005. The wedding was on 9 January 2015.

In 2023, she publisher her memoir Free Spirit.

== Honours and awards ==
- 1993 British Apparel Export Award (Ghost)
- 1999 Most Stylish Designer, Elle Style Awards (Ghost)
- 2010 Newcomers Exports Award, Fashion Export Awards (Handwritten)
- 2010 Appointed OBE (Officer of the Order of British Empire) for services to fashion industry, in the 2011 New year Honours. Announced 31 December 2010, presented 28 June 2011.

== Selected publications ==
- Sarne, Tanya (2023). Free Spirit: A Memoir of an Extraordinary Life. Hachette UK. ISBN 9781784728489.
