= Sarne =

Sarne is a surname. Notable people with the surname include:

- Claudia Sarne (born 1969), British-American composer
- Mike Sarne (born 1940), British actor, writer, producer and director
- Michael Sarne (1883–1961), American writer using pseudonym T. Arthur Plummer
- Tanya Sarne (born 1945), British fashion designer and entrepreneur
