= Bona Drag =

- Cover art for the original 1990 CD release

Compilation album by Morrissey
- Released: 15 October 1990
- Recorded: September 1987–December 1989
- Genre: Alternative rock
- Length: 49:45
- Label: His Master's Voice
- Producers: Stephen Street; Clive Langer; Alan Winstanley

Morrissey chronology
| Viva Hate (1988) | Bona Drag (1990) | Kill Uncle (1991) |

Singles from Bona Drag
- 1. "Piccadilly Palare" Released: 9 October 1990

Professional ratings
Review scores
| Source | Rating |
|---|---|
| AllMusic | 4.5/5 stars |
| Chicago Tribune | 3.5/4 stars |
| Entertainment Weekly | B+ |
| Los Angeles Times | 2.5/5 stars |
| NME | 8/10 |
| Pitchfork | 9.8/10 |
| Q | 4/5 stars |
| The Rolling Stone Album Guide | 4/5 stars |
| Uncut | 4/5 stars |
| The Village Voice | B+ |

Bona Drag is a compilation album by the English rock singer Morrissey, released on 15 October 1990 by His Master's Voice. The album features an array of Morrissey's most popular songs from his early solo career, most of which had not been released on any previous album. The album name meaning nice outfits is an example of the subculture slang Polari explored further on the album's first track "Piccadilly Palare". The album was certified Gold by the RIAA on 6 December 2000. In 2010, the album was remastered and expanded to include six bonus tracks.

== Background ==
After releasing Viva Hate in 1988, Morrissey decided to release a string of stand-alone singles in the hopes of achieving success in that market, followed eventually by a second album. The first of these was "The Last of the Famous International Playboys", which peaked at No. 6 in the UK. However, the second of these, "Interesting Drug", became delayed in March 1989 when Morrissey had an undisclosed financial disagreement with producer Stephen Street, leading Street to file an injunction on the release of the song. Street had been a longtime producer, musician and collaborator with Morrissey, dating back to his tenure with the Smiths. Street eventually lifted the injunction and "Interesting Drug" was released in April, peaking at No. 9.

In the aftermath of his rift with Street, Morrissey began working with producers Clive Langer and Alan Winstanley, known for their work with Madness and Elvis Costello. The first release, "Ouija Board, Ouija Board", was issued in November 1989 and peaked at No. 18. However, the song was received poorly by critics and even religious leaders, the latter of whom accused Morrissey of being involved with the occult. The criticism and limited success of the single temporarily curtailed the sessions for Morrissey's second album. It was at this time that Morrissey also fell out with former Smiths members Andy Rourke and Mike Joyce, who had performed on several of Morrissey's solo singles, due to financial issues dating back to their time with the Smiths.

In early 1990, Morrissey continued to work on the album, now titled Bona Drag, at Hook End Recording Studios. Six songs from these sessions would eventually see release, including "He Knows I'd Love to See Him" and "Get Off the Stage", while "Striptease With a Difference" would remain unreleased. Another single, "November Spawned a Monster", was released in April 1990 and peaked at No. 12. The single was also met with criticism by some for a perceived insensitivity towards those with disabilities.

At this time, the music press also criticized Morrissey for the fact that his last several singles had not reached the Top Ten, even though he had already sold more records as a solo artist than with the Smiths. Ultimately, Morrissey decided to scrap the idea of a full-length LP and release a compilation of singles and B-sides instead. In an interview with New Musical Express, he explained, "People will view it suspiciously in England but not in the rest of the world where all those funny little singles were never released. It was initially for the rest of the world, but EMI were determined to release it here."

== Release ==
Bona Drag features all six of Morrissey's solo singles up to that point, two of which ("Suedehead" and "Everyday Is Like Sunday") were taken from Viva Hate and four of which were Top Ten hits. The album reached No. 9 in the UK charts, while its lone new single, "Piccadilly Palare", peaked at No. 18. The album also includes seven B-sides, although "Will Never Marry" was edited down.

In the U.S., Bona Drag reached No. 59 on the Billboard 200. The album also contained the first songs by Morrissey to chart in the United States, all on the Modern Rock Tracks chart: "The Last of the Famous International Playboys" (No. 3); "Interesting Drug" (No. 11); "Ouija Board, Ouija Board" (No. 2); "November Spawned a Monster" (No. 6); and "Piccadilly Palare" (No. 2).

The title Bona Drag means "nice outfit" in Polari, a type of slang developed by the London gay community in the early 1960s, particularly in the Earl's Court and Piccadilly areas. Morrissey also used some of these words and phrases in "Piccadilly Palare". The album sleeve photo is an edited still from Morrissey's "November Spawned a Monster" promotional video.

=== 20th anniversary reissue ===
On 4 October 2010, the album was reissued on the resurrected Major Minor label, with six officially unreleased studio recordings. The artwork was edited and inner artwork updated with previously unseen photos chosen by Morrissey. It entered the UK charts at No. 67. The reissue included several edits, specifically a removed verse from "Ouija Board, Ouija Board" and a restored verse to "Piccadilly Palare".

== Track listing ==
All songs by Morrissey and Stephen Street, except where noted.

Side one
| No. | Title | Writer(s) | A-side/B-side | Length |
|---|---|---|---|---|
| 1. | "Piccadilly Palare" | Morrissey, Kevin Armstrong | New song, released as a single | 3:28 |
| 2. | "Interesting Drug" | | Single A-side | 3:27 |
| 3. | "November Spawned a Monster" | Morrissey, Clive Langer | Single A-side | 5:28 |
| 4. | "Will Never Marry" | | Edited version of B-side of "Everyday Is Like Sunday" | 2:22 |
| 5. | "Such a Little Thing Makes Such a Big Difference" | | B-side of "Interesting Drug" | 2:51 |
| 6. | "The Last of the Famous International Playboys" | | Single A-side | 3:40 |
| 7. | "Ouija Board, Ouija Board" | | Single A-side | 4:25 |

Side two
| No. | Title | Writer(s) | A-side/B-side | Length |
|---|---|---|---|---|
| 1. | "Hairdresser on Fire" | | B-side of "Suedehead" | 3:49 |
| 2. | "Everyday Is Like Sunday" | | Single A-side | 3:34 |
| 3. | "He Knows I'd Love to See Him" | Morrissey, Armstrong | B-side of "November Spawned a Monster" | 3:08 |
| 4. | "Yes, I Am Blind" | Morrissey, Andy Rourke | B-side of "Ouija Board, Ouija Board" | 3:44 |
| 5. | "Lucky Lisp" | | B-side of "The Last of the Famous International Playboys" | 2:51 |
| 6. | "Suedehead" | | Single A-side | 3:54 |
| 7. | "Disappointed" | | B-side of "Everyday is Like Sunday" | 3:06 |

=== 2010 re-release ===
The 2010 re-release features the following additional tracks:

- "Happy Lovers at Last United" (Outtake from "Everyday Is Like Sunday" sessions)
- "Lifeguard on Duty" (Outtake from Viva Hate sessions)
- "Please Help the Cause Against Loneliness" (demo) (Outtake from Viva Hate, previously covered by Sandie Shaw)
- "Oh Phoney" (Outtake from Bona Drag sessions) (Morrissey, Armstrong)
- "The Bed Took Fire" (early version of "At Amber")
- "Let the Right One Slip In" (alternate long mix) (Morrissey, Alain Whyte)

The following changes have been made to the original album:

- "Ouija Board, Ouija Board" has a verse removed ("The glass is moving, no, I was not pushing that time")
- "Piccadilly Palare" has an extra verse, as has circulated on bootlegs ("A cold-water room")
- "Interesting Drug" fades into "November Spawned a Monster"
- "Suedehead" edited to remove guitar fade on the intro.

== Personnel ==
- Morrissey – vocals
- Kevin Armstrong – guitar (1, 3, 7, 10, 11)
- Craig Gannon – guitar (2, 5, 6, 12)
- Neil Taylor – guitar (2, 5, 6, 12)
- Vini Reilly – guitar (4, 8, 9, 13, 14), piano (4, 8, 9, 13, 14)
- Andy Rourke – bass (1–3, 5, 6, 10, 12)
- Stephen Street – bass (4, 8, 9, 13, 14), keyboards (2, 5, 6, 12)
- Matthew Seligman – bass (7, 11)
- Andrew Paresi – drums (1, 3, 4, 7–11, 13, 14)
- Mike Joyce – drums (2, 5, 6, 12)

The following credits were adapted from the LP liner notes:

Additional musicians

- Suggs – additional voice (1)
- Kirsty MacColl – additional voice (2)
- Mary Margaret O'Hara – additional voice (3)

Technical

- Clive Langer – producer (1, 3, 7, 10, 11)
- Alan Winstanley – producer (1, 3, 7, 10, 11)
- Stewart Day – assistant engineer (1, 3, 7, 10, 11)
- Stephen Street – producer (2, 4–6, 8, 9, 12–14)
- Steve Williams – assistant engineer (2, 4–6, 8, 9, 12–14)
- Morrissey – sleeve
- Jo Slee – art co-ordination
- Designland – layout
- Jurgen Teller – Wapping and Battersea photographs

== Charts ==
Chart performance for Bona Drag
| Chart (1990) | Peak position |
|---|---|
| Australian Albums (ARIA) | 57 |
| Canada Top Albums/CDs (RPM) | 73 |
| New Zealand Albums (RMNZ) | 40 |
| UK Albums (OCC) | 9 |
| US Billboard 200 | 59 |

== Certifications and sales ==
| Region | Certification | Certified units/sales |
|---|---|---|
| United Kingdom (BPI) | Silver | 60,000^{^} |
| United States (RIAA) | Gold | 500,000^{^} |
^{^} Shipments figures based on certification alone.

== Bibliography ==
- Bret, David (1995). Morrissey. New York City: Carroll & Graf Publishers. ISBN 0-7867-0218-4.
