= Ghost (fashion brand) =

London fashion label

Ghost London
- Company type: Private
- Industry: Clothing
- Founded: 1984
- Founder: Tanya Sarne and Katharine Hamnett
- Headquarters: London, NW8; United Kingdom
- Products: Ready to wear Collection, Occasionwear, Bridal Collection and Bridesmaids dresses, Homeware, Beachwear, Essentials
- Owner: Touker Suleyman
- Website: www.ghost.co.uk

Ghost is a London fashion label founded in 1984 by Tanya Sarne. It is known for classic vintage clothing-influenced viscose crêpe, satin and georgette designs, which are modified slightly each season to keep them up to date, but do not follow trends. The Design Museum in London described the introduction of the Ghost dress as "one of those quiet revolutions" where the significance of an event in fashion history goes almost unnoticed at first.

== History ==
The Ghost label was founded by Tanya Sarne and the designer Katharine Hamnett. They called the label "Ghost" after Sarne's business methodology, which was to employ a team of in-house designers who would create, or "ghostwrite" the collections that would be linked to her name, under her supervision. Among the designers who worked for Ghost were Andrea Sargeant who created the original look, Nicholas Knightly (who had worked with Stirling Cooper and later went on to design for Mulberry and Louis Vuitton), Suzanne Deeken, who went on to design for Marc Jacobs, and Amy Roberts (a former Galliano assistant) who introduced knitwear in 2001. In the early 1990s, Ossie Clark, renowned for his fabric cutting skills, helped out at Ghost.

Ghost became known for its strongly vintage-influenced designs, often distinctively using rayon (viscose) fabrics, which if shrunk and dyed, developed a crinkled texture similar to vintage crepe. Not only could the fabrics be made in various weights and sizes, the clinging garments made from them were easy to wear, easy to care for, and could be worn by women of all ages and shapes. By 2006 Ghost was a globally recognised brand name.

In 1996, the department store Liberty gave Ghost more floor space than any other designer due to the popularity and saleability of the clothes. The clothes were also praised by industry insiders such as Nicola Jeal from Elle, who described them as products akin to Levi's jeans or Gap, and Grace Coddington, who described them as "clothes that women like to wear."

Ghost clothing was designed as a range of versatile and interchangeable separates which could be worn from one year to the next without looking out of date. Although seemingly delicate, Ghost clothes were hard wearing enough to survive being screwed up in a rucksack without needing ironing, which made them very attractive to tourists and travellers.

In May 2006, following the sale in December 2005 of controlling interest to Kevin Stanford and the Icelandic investment group Arev, Sarne resigned from the company. The Independent suggested that Sarne's unorthodox behaviour and approaches did not work well with Stanford and Arev's business ethos.

Two years after its founder resigned, Ghost went into administration in 2008 as a result of the Icelandic banking crisis. In late 2008 it was bought out by Touker Suleyman of Hawes & Curtis.
