= Interesting Drug =

1989 single by Morrissey

Single by Morrissey
- B-side: "Such a Little Thing Makes Such a Big Difference"
- Released: 17 April 1989
- Length: 3:32
- Label: His Master's Voice
- Songwriters: Morrissey, Stephen Street
- Producer: Stephen Street

Morrissey singles chronology
"The Last of the Famous International Playboys" (1989)	"Interesting Drug" (1989)	"Ouija Board, Ouija Board" (1989)

Professional ratings
Review scores
Source	Rating
AllMusic	3/5 stars

"Interesting Drug" is a song by English singer-songwriter Morrissey, released as a non-album single on 17 April 1989. Co-written by Morrissey and former Smiths producer Stephen Street, the song was Morrissey's fourth release after the Smiths break-up. Morrissey was inspired lyrically by the drug culture in the English lower class, which he felt was being clamped down on by the power-hungry Thatcher government. These political themes were further explored in its music video. The single was the second and final Morrissey solo single to feature his former Smiths bandmates Andy Rourke, Mike Joyce, and Craig Gannon.

"Interesting Drug" was recorded and released following Morrissey's debut album, Viva Hate. Upon release, the single became yet another commercial hit for Morrissey, reaching number nine in the UK in spite of controversy regarding its lyrics and music video. The song would later appear on the 1990 compilation album, Bona Drag.

In the years since its release, "Interesting Drug" has received positive critical reception.

== Background ==
Lyrically, "Interesting Drug" sees Morrissey explore his feeling that the Thatcher-administration was clamping down on working-class drug use to "keep people in their place". As such, drug use results from a "sense of rebellion". Morrissey explained in a 1989 interview:

'Interesting Drug' is about any drug, legal or illegal. We have to face the very simple fact that drugs can help people in many ways. Even with acid house parties and constant police invasions, it almost seems to me that whenever people in working class situations try to enjoy themselves or escape from what is forced upon them, they are stopped. It's almost as if this current government want people to be sheepish and depressed and not seen, and whenever they attempt to break out of that bubble, they are hit on the head.

Morrissey attributed the song's controversy to the direct nature of these lyrics, commenting, "I think the pop establishment can deal with pop drug culture in its present form because it doesn't convey anything. It's very vague and wispy and (lolls tongue out and rolls eyes) uuuuungh, unngh. But if you say. 'Interesting drug/ the one that you took/ God, it really helped you.' That line was just far too direct."

The track features Kirsty MacColl on backing vocals as well as his former colleagues in the Smiths: Andy Rourke, Mike Joyce, and Craig Gannon. All three also appear on the B-sides. Ultimately, this would be the final single which featured this line-up, with Joyce and Gannon entering legal disputes with Morrissey afterwards. In his autobiography, Morrissey recalled, "The unhappy past descend[ed] on me each time I hear[d] their voices and I decide[d] not to invite them to any further recording sessions."

Like previous Morrissey solo singles, the music to "Interesting Drug" was written by former Smiths producer Stephen Street. This included the song's bassline, in spite of the presence of Rourke: Street explained, "I always was aware that the bass lines were very important to where Morrissey took his vocal, so we would often write a song around a bass line, like on 'Interesting Drug.'" Per Street, Rourke "did his own version of it" nonetheless. Gannon later pointed to the song as one of his best performances on any Morrissey or Smiths-related tracks.

== Release ==
Street initially sought to halt the release of "Interesting Drug" as leverage to address a dispute over production royalties from Viva Hate. Street explained, "My lawyer told me that the only way I could sort out my production royalty situation was to get an injunction that would delay the release of the 'Interesting Drug' single, which I'd worked on, after Viva Hate. That did happen, but I thought it was making me look so bad that I relented and let them release the single. In the end it did get sorted out and I was given two-and-a-half points. I think my legal action left a bad taste with Morrissey. I remember the final postcard I got from him. It just said, 'Enough is too much' (laughs)."

"Interesting Drug" reached number nine in the UK, becoming Morrissey's last top-10 single until 1994. The song was not featured on one of Morrissey's main studio albums but can be found on the compilation album Bona Drag along with the B-side "Such a Little Thing Makes Such a Big Difference". The artwork for the single features Morrissey photographed by Lawrence Watson. Morrissey originally planned for "At Amber" to appear as the song's B-side, but it was instead shelved until it appeared as the B-side on the "Piccadilly Palare" single.

== Music video ==
Like previous videos for Morrissey and the Smiths, the "Interesting Drug" video was directed by Tim Broad. The video features a group of high heel-wearing, NME-reading schoolboys who join together with an older woman cyclist played by Diane Alton. At the end of the video, Morrissey appears to give the group animal rights literature, prompting them to break into a facility to free lab rabbits. This main story is interspersed with clips of Morrissey and his backing band performing the song. Among other things, the video features a cameo of a copy of Moby-Dick as well as a reference to Morrissey favorite Charles Hawtrey in the fictional Hawtrey high school the boys attended.

The words "Bad people on the right" were written on a wall during one scene, which Morrissey said "would apply to the Conservative government."

The video prompted controversy and was banned by the BBC for a period. It eventually appeared on Top of the Pops, but omitting a scene featuring a blood-covered dead seal.

== Critical reception ==
Edwin Pouncey in NME gave a positive review, saying the song was a "finely crafted pop single", while also commenting, "I still ache with a longing to know just what Morrissey's minions see in the man, what special stardust quality does he possess to endear him so closely to their palpitating hearts". Fellow NME writer Stuart Maconie spoke similarly in his review of Bona Drag, writing, "'Interesting Drug' is no classic but it is quite sprightly and does contain that drumbeat in full."

In a retrospective review, Ned Raggett of AllMusic called the song "a vicious slam on the long-loathed by him Tory government and a sometimes slightly too breathless musical and singing rush". The same site's Dave Thompson praised MacColl's "delightful vocal melody" as well as the song's "lyric that apparently muses on the power trips enjoyed by those people positioned to 'save their own skins by ruining people's lives.'" Spin named it Morrissey's 13th best solo song, writing, "He may have intended it as another shot at his much-loathed Tories, but it fits just fine for ethically bankrupt villains of other eras too."

"Interesting Drug" did see acclaim from other musicians at the time. The Durutti Column guitarist and former Morrissey collaborator Vini Reilly listed it first on his list of all-time favorite records. Chas Smash of Madness named it his favorite Morrissey song, stating, "Morrissey is a most interesting drug, curiously tasty."

== Live performances ==
Morrissey first performed the song live at his infamous debut solo concert at Wolverhampton's Civic Hall on 22 December 1988, alongside Rourke, Joyce, and Gannon. The song was unreleased at the time. Their performance of the Smiths song "Sweet and Tender Hooligan" from that night would appear on the 12-inch single of "Interesting Drug". It was also performed in 1991 and 1992 and three times in the autumn of 2007.

== Track listings ==
7-inch vinyl

No.	Title	Length
1.	"Interesting Drug"	3:32
2.	"Such a Little Thing Makes Such a Big Difference"	2:54

12-inch one-sided etched vinyl (HMV 12POPS1621)

No.	Title	Length
1.	"Interesting Drug"	3:32
2.	"Such a Little Thing Makes Such a Big Difference"	2:54

12-inch vinyl, compact disc and cassette

No.	Title	Length
1.	"Interesting Drug"	3:32
2.	"Such a Little Thing Makes Such a Big Difference"	2:54
3.	"Sweet and Tender Hooligan (live in Wolverhampton, 1988)"	3:59

== Personnel ==
- Morrissey – vocals
- Kirsty MacColl – backing vocals
- Craig Gannon – guitar
- Neil Taylor – guitar
- Andy Rourke – bass guitar
- Stephen Street – keyboard
- Mike Joyce – drums

== Release history ==
Country	Record label	Format	Catalogue number	Notes
UK	His Master's Voice	7-inch vinyl	POP1621	
UK	His Master's Voice	12-inch vinyl	12POP1621	
UK	His Master's Voice	12-inch etched vinyl	12POPS1621	
UK	His Master's Voice	Compact disc	CDPOP1621	
UK	His Master's Voice	Cassette	TCPOP1621	

== Charts ==
Chart (1989)	Peak position
Europe (Eurochart Hot 100)	32
Ireland (IRMA)	4
New Zealand (Recorded Music NZ)	11
UK Singles (OCC)	9
US Alternative Airplay (Billboard)	11
