= Not Today, Thank You =

British radio show

Not Today, Thank You is a six-part British radio comedy featured on BBC Radio 4 which aired from 22 August 2006 to 26 September 2006.

It stars Harry Shearer (known for The Simpsons and This Is Spinal Tap) as Nostrils, a man convinced that he is extremely unattractive, and Brian Hayes as Brian Hughes, an aging radio presenter who tries to broadcast his radio show from his grandmother's basement before being met by a TV producer.

== Cast ==
- Deborah O'Brien - Jean
- Brian Hayes - Brian Hughes
- Alex Lowe - Neville/Reggie
- Andrew McGibbon - Rolf/professor
- Mark Perry - Donny/TV producer
- Nick Romero - Colonel
- Harry Shearer - Announcer/Nostrils
- Sheridan Smith - Showbiz Kat
