= The Last of the Famous International Playboys =

1989 single by Morrissey

Single by Morrissey
- B-side: "Lucky Lisp"; "Michaels Bones"
- Released: 30 January 1989
- Genre: Alternative rock
- Length: 3:37
- Label: His Master's Voice
- Songwriters: Morrissey; Stephen Street
- Producer: Stephen Street

Morrissey singles chronology
"Everyday Is Like Sunday" (1988)	"The Last of the Famous International Playboys" (1989)	"Interesting Drug" (1989)

Professional ratings
Review scores
Source	Rating
Allmusic	4/5 stars

"The Last of the Famous International Playboys" is a 1989 song by British vocalist Morrissey.

Co-written by Morrissey and producer Stephen Street, the song was Morrissey's third release after the 1987 breakup of his earlier group Smiths. Morrissey's lyrics were inspired by gangster brothers the Kray Twins, notorious in London's East End during the 1960s, whom he believed to be an example of the media glamourizing violent criminals. Street wrote the music, which took influence from the post-punk group the Fall and an introduction similar to that of "The Man Who Sold the World" by David Bowie. The single was the first Morrissey solo single to feature his former Smiths bandmates Andy Rourke, Mike Joyce, and Craig Gannon.

"The Last of the Famous International Playboys" was recorded and released following Morrissey's debut album Viva Hate. Upon release, the single became another commercial hit for Morrissey, reaching number six in the UK despite initially mixed reviews. The song later appeared on the 1990 compilation album Bona Drag.

The song was a commercial success upon its release and has since been praised as one of Morrissey's best songs.

== Background ==
In a 1989 interview, Morrissey joked "'The Last of the Famous International Playboys' are Bowie, Bolan, Devoto and me." Lyrically, however, "The Last of the Famous International Playboys" largely mythologizes the notorious pair of vicious London gangsters known as the Kray twins Ronnie and Reggie, who held a tight rein on the East End of London during the 1950s and 1960s. Morrissey explained that he wanted to explore the way that the tabloid press made celebrities out of violent criminals in the song, saying that the Krays "exemplify" the "way notorious people can be quite glamorous." He elaborated in a separate interview:

I think a lot of people, in order to be seen, in order to be famous and in order to be acknowledged, do something destructive or commit murder. In America, the perfect example is serial killers who quite obviously don't mind being caught and don't mind being known as mass-murderers. They want their element of fame, and they get it always.

"The Last of the Famous International Playboys" and follow-up single "Interesting Drug" are notable for featuring three of Morrissey's former colleagues in the Smiths: bassist Andy Rourke, drummer Mike Joyce and rhythm guitarist Craig Gannon. For his previous solo work on Viva Hate, Morrissey consciously chose not to work with his former bandmates; Street said "I think he thought it would cloud the issue." All three sidemen also appear on the B-side "Lucky Lisp".

As on Morrissey's previous solo songs, Street composed the music for "The Last of the Famous International Playboys". He wrote the song's bassline despite the presence of Rourke. Street said "The songs I gave them to work on, 'Interesting Drug' and '...International Playboys' you know, they were my bass lines and such. I mean, Andy did his own version of it, but they were my bass lines...Andy is such a lovely guy, he would add to it, and he is such a great bass player." Street described the song "as a Fall type droning dirge," recalling "Morrissey heard it and to my surprise said he'd like to use it. He came back a while later, suggested speeding it up, and presented 'Last of the Famous International Playboys'. I was stunned."

== Release ==
Morrissey said in a 1989 interview that he had high hopes for the single: "'The Last Of Famous International Playboys', is the first record that I feel hysterical about. And I'm very pleased to feel that way. I compare it to 'Shoplifters of the World Unite'. I heard 'Shoplifters of the World Unite' once on the radio, a chart rundown. It was a new entry. They had to play it. They had no choice. And I laughed hysterically as it listened to it. I felt a great sense of victory. And that's the same way I feel about 'The Last of the Famous International Playboys.'"

The single was another commercial success for Morrissey, with James Brown of the NME writing, in early 1989, "I have already heard serious suggestion that 'Last of the Famous Playboys' will be Morrissey's first number one hit record." It reached number 6 on the UK Singles Chart. The song was not featured on one of Morrissey's main studio albums but can be found on the compilation album Bona Drag along with the B-side "Lucky Lisp". The artwork for the single features Morrissey, aged 6, up a tree in Chorlton-on-Medlock, Manchester—literally a boy at play. When asked if he had changed since the photo was taken, Morrissey said "Well, I have a new sweater."

Morrissey first performed the song live at his infamous debut solo concert at Wolverhampton's Civic Hall in December 1988, alongside Rourke, Joyce, and Gannon. That same month, The Guardian described the show as "primarily a showcase for Morrissey's New Year single, 'The Last of the Famous International Playboys.'" The song was performed live by Morrissey on his 1991, 1992, 2007, 2011 and 2018 tours.

== Critical reception ==
NME initially gave the single a negative review, with Stuart Maconie saying the track was "'Panic' without the magnetism and the blinding self-confidence" and concluding "I would still chain myself to a disused railway line in Bacup for him, but the lad can do better"—in a review for Bona Drag one year later, however, Maconie expressed a change of heart, writing, "At the time of its release, I was rather mealy-mouthed about 'Playboys' so let me take this chance of saying I was wrong about this sterling tune full of stomping boot boy romanticism." "The Last of the Famous International Playboys" has seen critical acclaim in the years since its release. In a retrospective review, Ned Raggett of AllMusic was much more favorable, writing "Morrissey's performance is grand and passionate". PopMatters was similarly complimentary, writing "'Such things I do / Just to make myself / More attractive to you / Have I failed? he asks. No, clearly, no again and again." Rolling Stone described it as a "great nonalbum single."

Other music writers have ranked the song as being among Morrissey's better songs. Spin named it Morrissey's seventh best solo song, writing "Unusually wiggy guitar effects add to the unseemly drama." Clash included it in its unranked list of the seven best Morrissey solo singles, writing "A love letter to London's notorious Kray twins, it's playful, hilarious and supremely confident. It rocks too, full of hip swinging swagger and glorious effervescence."

According to Johnny Rogan, Johnny Marr was so impressed with the quality of the song that he sent Morrissey a postcard congratulating him. In a 1991 interview, Marr said "I did send him a note telling him that 'Last of the Famous International Playboys' was really good, a good 'un, something I knew he'd be proud of." Reggie Kray, meanwhile, acknowledged the song in his biography, stating "I liked the tune, but the lyrics in their entirety were lacking a little. They came quite close..." Morrissey, in turn, joked "I can't get away from critics".

== Music video ==
The official video was directed by Tim Broad. It stars the actor Jason Rush, who had appeared in the 1987 television drama Two of Us, intercut with footage of the band performing against a green-screen backdrop. In the video, Rush is portrayed as the song's "dear hero imprisoned" in his metaphorical jail of a bedroom with walls decorated with posters of male icons such as Elvis Presley, Jack Nicholson, and George Best. The video later appeared on the compilation Hulmerist, which comprises seven videos made by Broad for Morrissey songs.

== Track listings ==
7-inch vinyl

1. "The Last of the Famous International Playboys"
2. "Lucky Lisp"

12-inch vinyl, CD and cassette

1. "The Last of the Famous International Playboys"
2. "Lucky Lisp"
3. "Michael's Bones"

== Musicians ==
- Morrissey – vocals
- Neil Taylor – guitar
- Craig Gannon – guitar
- Andy Rourke – bass
- Stephen Street – keyboards
- Mike Joyce – drums

== Release details ==
Country	Record label	Format	Catalogue number	Notes
UK	His Master's Voice	7-inch vinyl	POP1620	
UK	His Master's Voice	12-inch vinyl	12POP1620	
UK	His Master's Voice	Compact disc	CDPOP1620	
UK	His Master's Voice	Cassette	TCPOP1620	

== Charts ==
Chart (1989–1990)	Peak position
UK Singles (Official Charts)	6
US Alternative Airplay (Billboard)	3

== 2013 reissue ==
"The Last of the Famous International Playboys"

Single by Morrissey
- Released: 8 April 2013
- Genre: Alternative rock
- Length: 3:37
- Label: EMI/Parlophone
- Songwriter: Morrissey/Street

Morrissey singles chronology
"Suedehead (Mael Mix)" (2012)	"The Last of the Famous International Playboys" (2013)	"Satellite of Love" (2013)

The single was reissued along with a remastered version of his 1991 album Kill Uncle on 8 April 2013. The single was released in three versions, backed by new live Morrissey songs recorded in June 2011 by the BBC.

The 7-inch single included "People Are the Same Everywhere (BBC live version)" while the CD included "Action Is My Middle Name (BBC live version)". "The Kid's a Looker (BBC live version)" was available via digital download.

On 7 February 2013, it was stated on Morrissey's official website that the single would not feature the album artwork it was intended to feature. The cover art was to feature a previously unseen 1992 photo of Morrissey and David Bowie appearing together in New York City, but Bowie had demanded that the photo not be used by EMI UK. Instead a photo of Morrissey and Rick Astley, taken backstage at Top of the Pops in 1989, was used in its place.
