= Elephants to Catch Eels =

- Genre: Historical comedy
- Running time: 30 minutes
- Country of origin: United Kingdom
- Language(s): English
- Home station: BBC Radio 4
- Syndicates: BBC Radio 4 Extra
- Starring: Lucy Speed (series 1); Sheridan Smith (series 2); John Bowe
- Written by: Tom Jamieson; Nev Fountain
- Produced by: Jan Ravens
- Original release: 12 February 2003 – 24 May 2004
- No. of series: 2
- No. of episodes: 12
- Audio format: Stereophonic sound
- Website: https://www.bbc.co.uk/programmes/b00fkh25

Elephants to Catch Eels is a historical situation comedy originally broadcast on BBC Radio 4. It was broadcast in two series of six half-hour episodes each, from February to March 2003 and April to May 2004. It was written by Tom Jamieson and Nev Fountain and produced by Jan Ravens.

Set in the fictional Drumlin Bay, Cornwall, during the 1790s, Elephants To Catch Eels follows the smuggling exploits of the resourceful Tamsyn Trelawney (Lucy Speed [series 1]; Sheridan Smith [series 2]) and her drunken innkeeper father Jago (John Bowe). The new Customs Collector, Major Thomas Falconer (Cameron Stewart), finds it difficult to believe a woman could be involved in smuggling, unlike his deputy, Captain Marriot (Andrew McGibbon). Other characters include Squire Bascombe (Martin Hyder), the gibberish-spouting Mad Gilbert (also played by Hyder) and the gullible Dewey (Mark Felgate), with other parts played by Mark Perry, Michael Fenton Stevens, Phil Nice and India Fisher. In the last two episodes of Series 1, Imelda Staunton guest-starred as rival smuggler Courageous Kate. Anachronistic allusions, such as a "Smuggling Personality of the Year" contest, are part of the comedy.
