= Mike Joyce (musician) =

English drummer (born 1963)

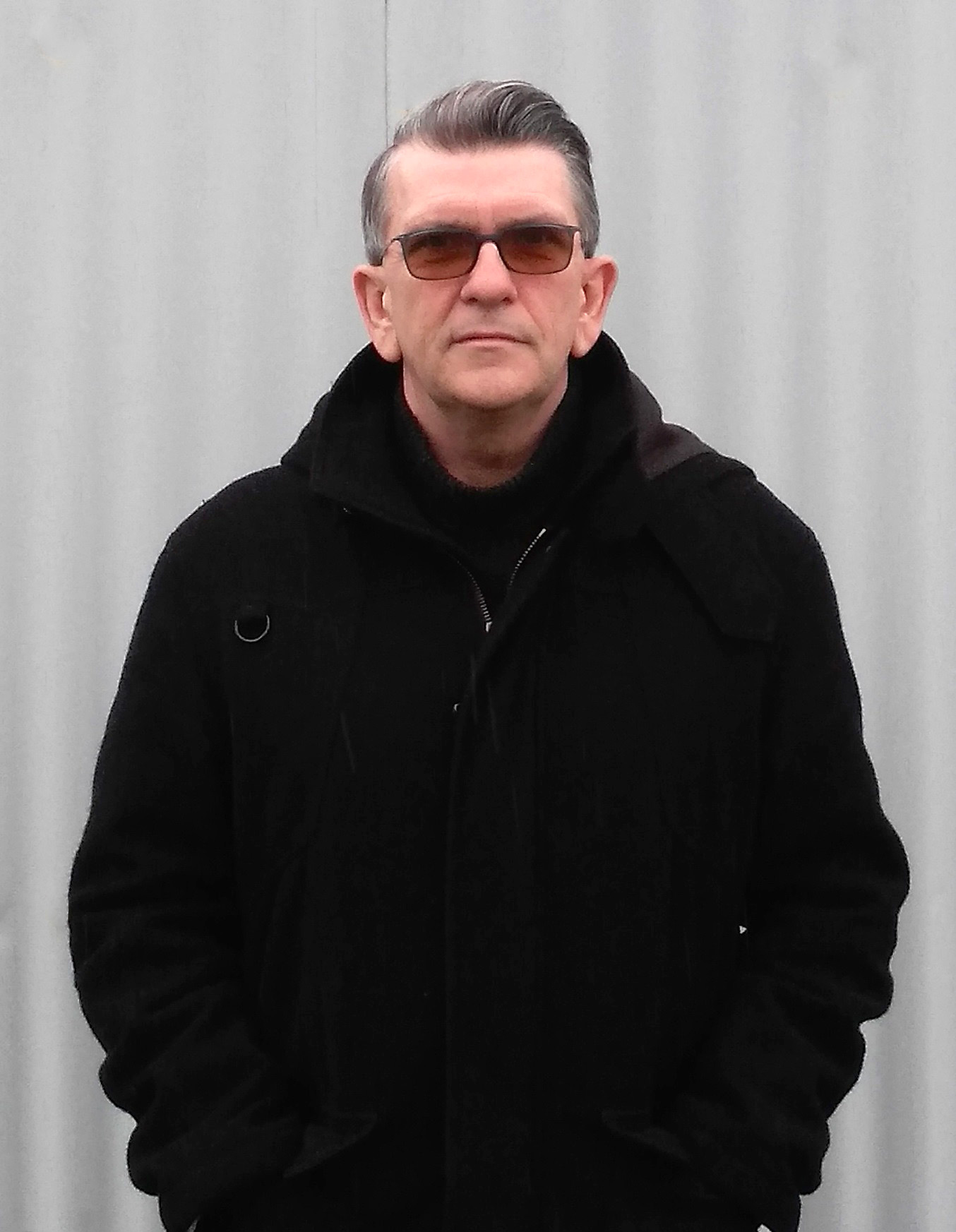
- Joyce in 2018

Background information
- Born: Michael Adrian Paul Joyce; 1 June 1963 (age 63); Manchester, England
- Origin: Fallowfield, Manchester, England
- Genres: Alternative rock; indie pop; post-punk; punk rock
- Occupation: Musician
- Instrument: Drums
- Years active: 1982–present
- Formerly of: The Smiths; Buzzcocks; Public Image Ltd
- Website: mikejoyce.com

Michael Adrian Paul Joyce (born 1 June 1963) is an English musician. He is best known for being the drummer for the Smiths from October 1982 to 1987.

== Career ==
While the Smiths provided Joyce with his first taste of success, he had previously drummed for Manchester band the Hoax and Northern Irish punk rock group Victim. Immediately after the break-up of the band in 1987, Joyce and Smiths bassist Andy Rourke played with Sinéad O'Connor. They, along with Craig Gannon, also provided the rhythm section for two singles by Smiths' singer Morrissey – "Interesting Drug" and "The Last of the Famous International Playboys" and their B-sides. Work with Suede, Buzzcocks, Public Image Ltd, Julian Cope, P. P. Arnold and Pete Wylie followed throughout the 1990s. Joyce, Rourke, and Gannon reunited to work on a project with fellow Manchester musician Aziz Ibrahim (formerly of the Stone Roses and Simply Red), ex-Oasis guitarist Bonehead (as Moondog One), and Vinny Peculiar.

In July 2007, Joyce and Rourke released Inside the Smiths, a DVD which chronicled their experiences of being in the band. In October 2007, Joyce toured the UK playing drums for Vinny Peculiar with Bonehead (Oasis) on bass guitar, and in 2008 he presented the Alternative Therapy radio show on Revolution 96.2 FM at The Brickhouse until the station changed format, later reviving it on Manchester Radio Online and Tin Can Media. He hosts The Coalition Chart Show on East Village Radio, which streams from New York. In parallel to his music career, Joyce works as a DJ and broadcaster, including occasional appearances on BBC 6 Music. Joyce has hosted shows on East Village Radio, an internet station.

Since October 2017, Joyce has hosted a weekly radio show on Manchester radio station XS Manchester. In October 2018, the show was nominated in the 'Best Specialist Music Show' category at the ARIAS 2018 radio awards. Joyce is a patron of the Manchester-based charity Back on Track; as part of this role, Joyce ran a special cooking session with some of the charity's clients, during which they cooked vegetables from his allotment, and featured as a story on ITV Granada.

== Personal life ==
Joyce was born in Manchester to Irish Catholic parents, and attended St Gregory's Grammar School in the city. As a young man, he lived in the notorious Hulme Crescents estate. Joyce married Christina Riley in 1994. He is a vegetarian. Joyce is a Manchester City fan, and is sometimes interviewed at City Square before important home matches.

In 1996, Joyce sued former Smiths' colleagues Johnny Marr and Morrissey for an equal share of performance and recording royalties. Joyce won the case and was awarded damages of around £1 million from Morrissey and Marr. According to Morrissey, who unsuccessfully appealed Joyce's claims, Joyce first sued Morrissey and Marr in 1989 for 25% of the Smiths' recording royalties. In 1996, Joyce won the case "on the basis of the 1890 Partnership Act".

Joyce published his memoir, The Drums, in November 2025.

== Discography ==
=== The Smiths ===
- The Smiths (1984)
- Meat Is Murder (1985)
- The Queen Is Dead (1986)
- Strangeways, Here We Come (1987)

=== Morrissey ===
Singles

- "The Last of the Famous International Playboys" (1989)
- "Interesting Drug" (1989)

Albums

- Bona Drag (1990)

=== Julian Cope ===
- Peggy Suicide (1991)

== Charitable work ==
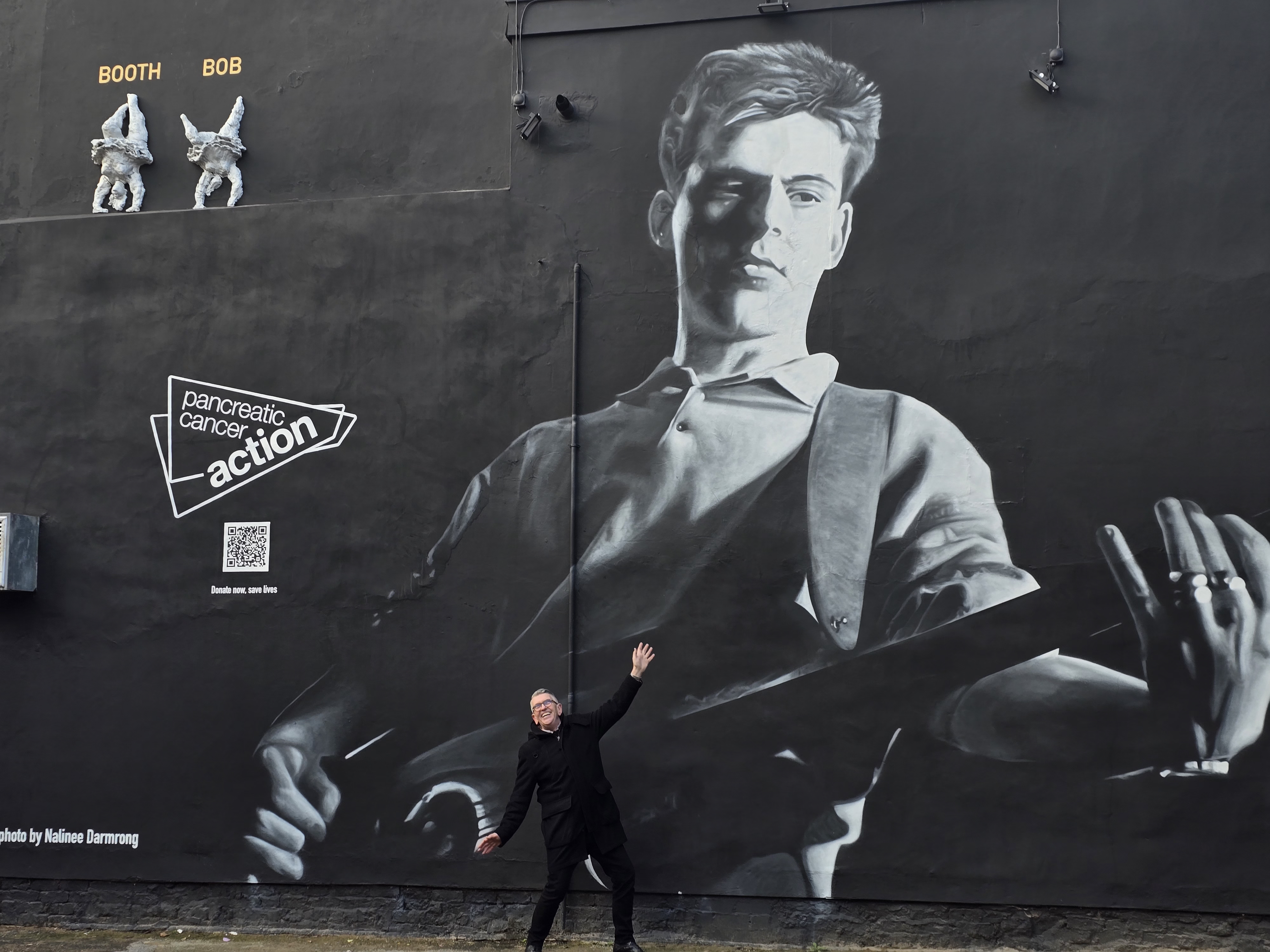
Joyce at the unveiling of the Andy Rourke memorial mural

In November 2024, Joyce organised the crowdfunder for the Andy Rourke memorial mural to help raise awareness of the Pancreatic Cancer Action charity.

The mural was painted by Manchester-based artist Akse-P19, who has created artwork of other notable musicians.

The mural was unveiled on 21 November 2024, with Joyce and Nalinee Darmrong, the photographer whose image the work was based on, in attendance.
