= Political T-shirt =

Clothing item showing a political message

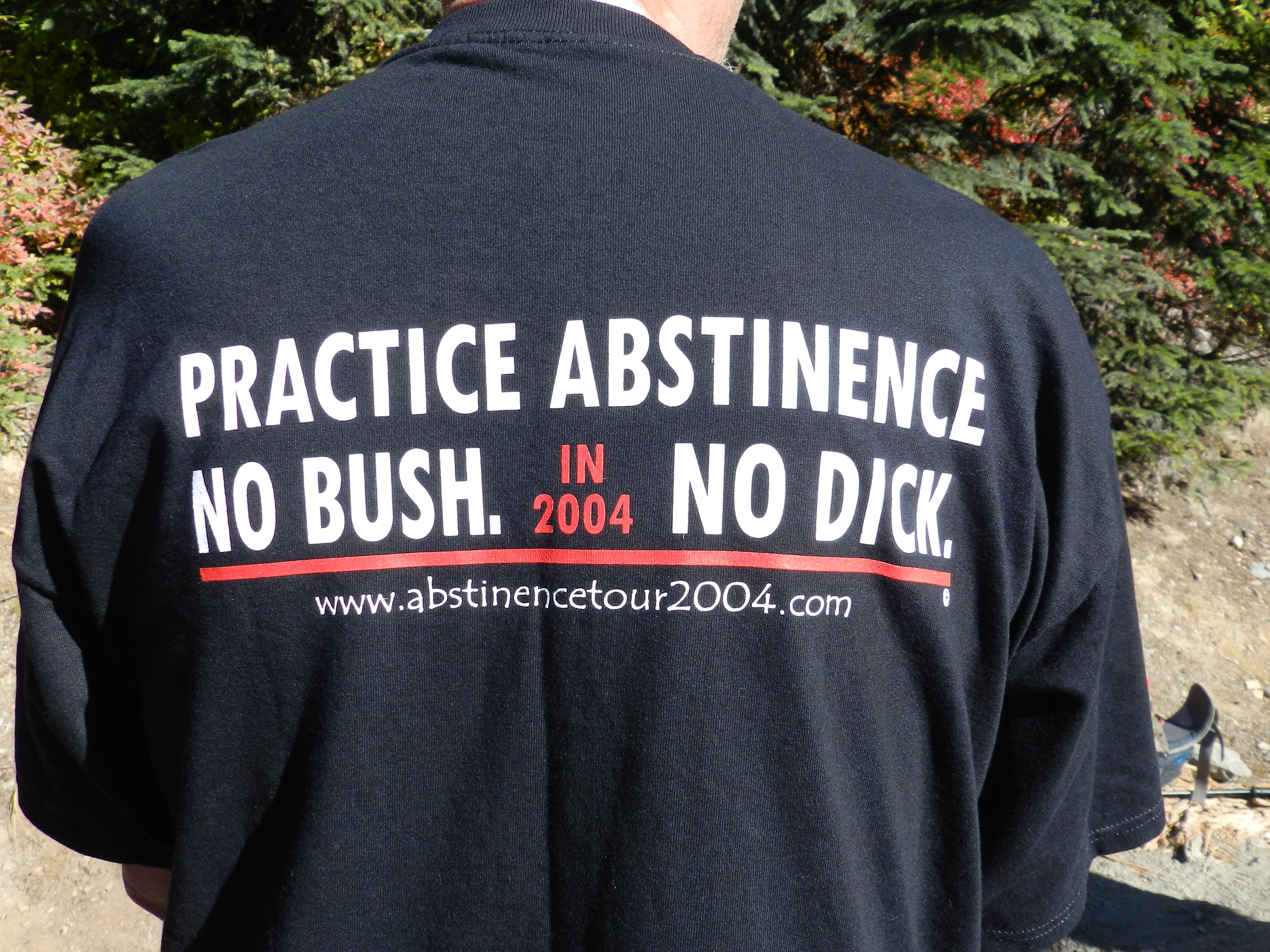
A political T-shirt

A political T-shirt is a T-shirt that has a political slogan or image printed on it and which is intended to convey a political message.

== History ==
The earliest recorded political T-shirt was created in 1948 by the Governor of New York, Thomas E. Dewey. He put "Dew-it-with Dewey" on a T-shirt to support his political campaign. Although it didn't land him the job, the shirt did have enough of an impact for Dwight D. Eisenhower's supporters to adopt similar tactics four years later.

It is suggested that Katharine Hamnett revived the use of such shirts in 1984. Dressed in a "58% Don't Want Pershing" t-shirt, she was photographed shaking hands with the then-prime minister Margaret Thatcher at a Downing Street reception for London fashion week designers in 1984. The slogan referred to public opposition to the basing of US Pershing missiles in the UK at the tail end of the Cold War.

== See also ==
- Fashion activism
