= Deborah Marquit =

American fashion designer

- Born: New York, United States
- Education: Parson's School of Design
- Known for: Fashion designer
- Label: Deborah Marquit
- Website: www.deborahmarquit.com

Deborah Marquit (born November 22, 1954) is an American fashion designer and the founder of her namesake brand, which she launched in 1984. She was the first designer to create women's bras and underwear in fluorescent neon colors in 1984.

== Early life and education ==
Deborah Marquit was born in Brooklyn, New York. She studied at the High School of Art and Design and Parson’s School of Design. She then worked at Women's Wear Daily as a fashion illustrator.

== Design career ==
In 1984, Marquit created a range of women's bras and underwear in fluorescent neon colored lace, which she sold to seventeen Bloomingdale's stores for $42,000. This was the first time that underwear in neon colors was available. Marquit has since released underwear ranges in such fabrics as Lame´, Fluorescent sheer tulle. camouflage, animal prints, and vinyl. The fabrics in fluorescent colors are hand-dyed, and the products are made by hand. She has also designed clothes including blouses, skirts, and also bright colored suits in vinyl in 1995. She opened two boutiques, one in New York's Soho in the 1990s and another on West 15th Street in 2005.

Marquit has designed underwear for the movie's Pulp Fiction in which Uma Thurman wears a Navy Blue and White bandana bustier exposed in the key resuscitation scene; and for Tim Burton's Mars Attacks, in which Sarah Jessica Parker wears a hologram vinyl bra set when captured by the martians; and in director Zalman King's Wild Orchid II, featuring actress Nina Siemaszko. Marquit has also created lingerie for Madonna's album cover Sticky & Sweet and for her music video Human Nature (Madonna song). . Marquit was commissioned by Tim Burton to make vinyl hot pants, shirts and mini-skirts to complement the underwear he had purchased for his girlfriend of the time, Lisa Marie. Designer brands Ghost and L.A.M.B by Gwen Stefani featured variations of her fluorescent lace bras and briefs in fluorescent pink, yellow, lime and orange for their runway shows, and Anna Sui featured printed fabric bras and bustiers made for her runway shows in 1994.

In 2025 Marquit has designed the Fluorescent Orange lingerie set for actress/director Zoe Kravitz in the film Caught Stealing and in 2024 for the film Babygirl featuring actress Nicole Kidman. Marquit has designed Faux Patent Leather costumes for the entertainer and singer Addison Rae in 2026. In 2026, Marquit has been commissioned to create various custom bras for Madonna press appearances.

Deborah Marquit was inducted into the (CFDA) Council of Fashion Designers of America in 2009.
