= Hawes & Curtis =

British clothier

- Type: Private
- Industry: Clothier
- Founded: 1913 in London, England
- Founder: Ralph Hawes; George Frederic Curtis
- Headquarters: London, England, UK
- Area served: United Kingdom; Cologne, Germany; UAE
- Key people: Touker Suleyman (Chairman)
- Products: Clothing
- Parent: Low Profile Holdings
- Website: hawesandcurtis.co.uk

Hawes & Curtis is a British fashion company founded in 1913, currently operating 29 stores in the United Kingdom including two in Jermyn Street, London. The brand is best known for their shirts and jackets.

== History ==
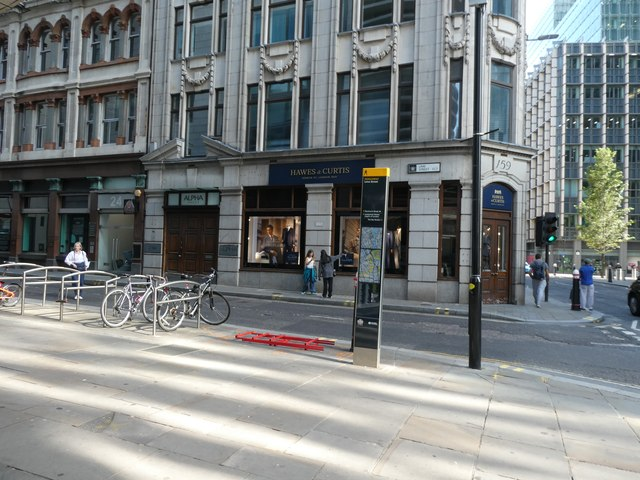
Shop on Lime Street, City of London

The company was founded by two tailors, Ralph Hawes and George Frederic "Freddie" Curtis, who opened the first store in Piccadilly Arcade, at the corner of Jermyn Street, in London in 1913.

On 1 December 1922, Hawes & Curtis Hosiers was granted a royal warrant by the then Prince of Wales (the future King Edward VIII and Duke of Windsor). In July 1938, King George VI awarded the company a second royal warrant, and then, in 1948, a third one to Hawes & Curtis Tailors. This warrant lasted throughout the King's reign. In 1957, the Duke of Edinburgh awarded Hawes & Curtis with a fourth Royal Warrant which remained until 1985.

Businessman Touker Suleyman acquired the company under the group Low Profile Holdings in 2002 for the symbolic amount of £1.

== Influence ==
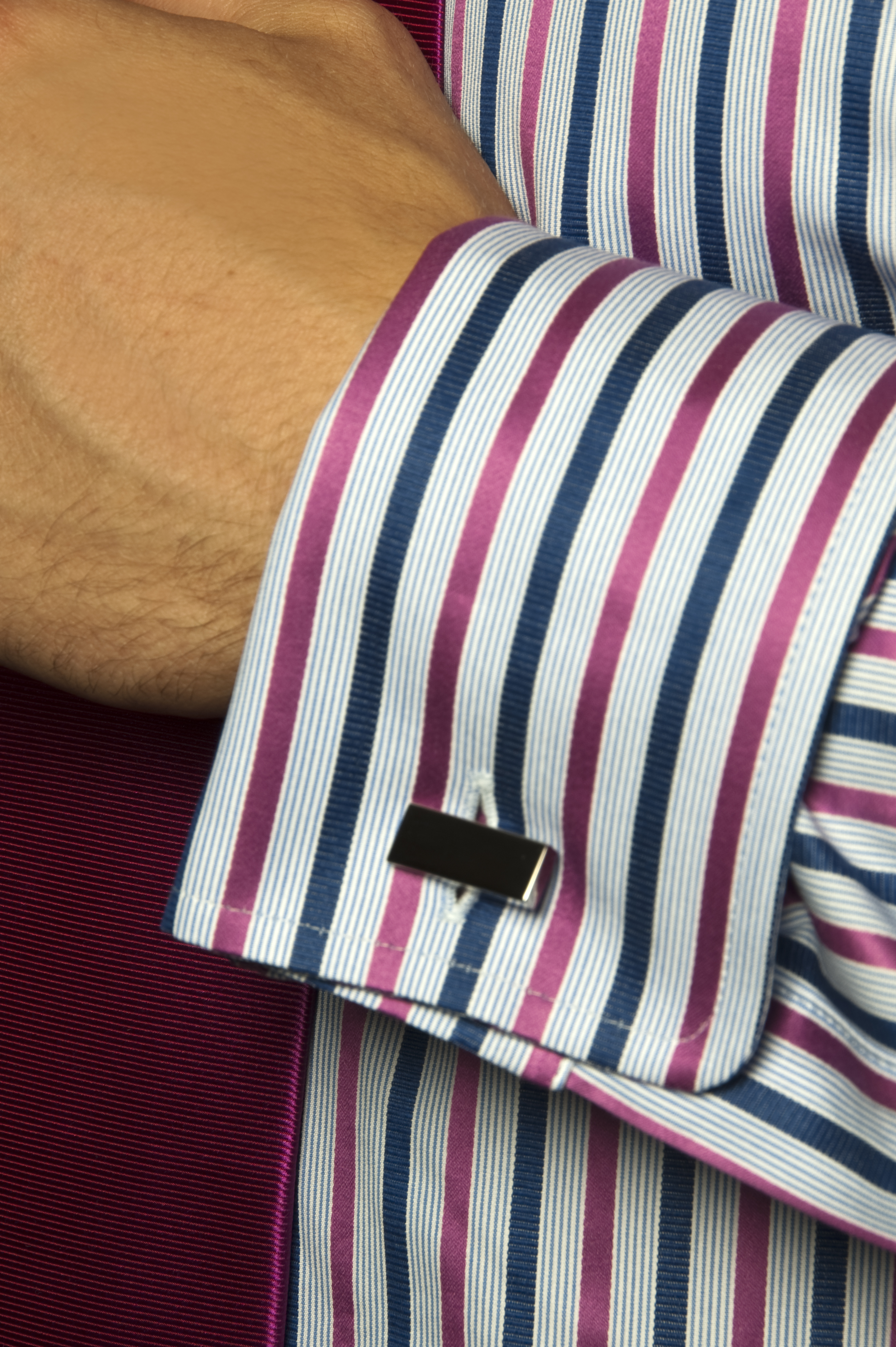
Hawes & Curtis shirt detail

Hawes & Curtis are known for introducing the backless evening waistcoat. It was an innovation of the ‘dress soft’ era popularised by the Duke of Windsor. The waistcoat was designed without a back and held in place by means of bands, fastened with a buckle or button across the back at the waistline. When worn, the waistcoat always remained in position under the tailcoat and was renowned for its comfort. Fred Astaire allegedly approached Hawes & Curtis to have one made, only to be regretfully refused due to the high demand for such garments from the British aristocracy.

According to the Review of Savile Row Tailors, by the 1930s, "Mr Curtis was an authority in evening dress and had done more to keep shirts from bulging out of up-creeping waistcoats than any other young man in London. Evening shirts and waistcoats were made on scientific mathematical lines – yet were chic withal."

== Notable customers ==
Notable customers have included Cary Grant, the Duke of Windsor, Earl Mountbatten Frank Sinatra, and Fred Astaire.

== Today ==
The company celebrated its 100th anniversary in October 2013. It currently operates 29 stores in the United Kingdom, with the main store on Jermyn Street. Hawes & Curtis also has a store in Cologne, Germany, and the UAE. The company operates a British, German and Australian website.
