= Clive Bull =

English radio talk show host

Clive Bull (born 23 January 1959) is an English radio talk show host, best known for presenting a late-night show on LBC in London.

== Background ==
Bull was educated at Dulwich College in south east London, between 1970 and 1977 where he was a leading light of the tape-based "College Radio". He has a degree in Educational Broadcasting from the University of London and a distinction in Radio Journalism from The National Broadcasting School.

He joined LBC as a telephone operator. He worked as a producer for Steve Allen's LBC show Nightline and later went on to review books for the same show. Later he presented a range of programmes including gardening phone-ins and the station's youth programme Young London. His big break was as host of the overnight Clive Bull Through the Night Show which ran for several years in the early 1990s. In 1994 he was hired by London News Talk 1152 (as LBC's AM service was briefly known) to host the weekend late-night slot. The following year he moved to weeknights where he remained for 16 years.

== LBC radio show ==
Bull's show aired live Sunday to Thursday from 10pm to 1am. With slight variations in show times, Bull occupied the same late night slot from 1995 to 2011 despite numerous changes of station brand and ownership during this time.

Discussions tend to focus around two or three topics each show based loosely upon what is in the news. However, he encourages callers to talk about whatever they like, on the basis that more interesting discussions come from things people genuinely care about. There were special-interest nights, including a science hour series with Brian J. Ford.

The 1991 short television programme Night Caller followed the callers to Bull's through-the-night show.

In June 2011, Bull said he would be taking a break from talk radio, stating that: "After thirty wonderful years with LBC, I'm looking forward to being up all day and going to bed at a sensible hour". Bull was succeeded on the Late Show by his friend and former LBC colleague Anthony Davis. Less than a year later, Bull returned to LBC presenting Sunday to Thursday from 7pm to 10pm, starting on Easter Sunday 2012.

In September 2018, LBC announced a new autumn schedule. Bull moved to weekends to present Saturday 6–8pm and Sundays 6–9pm shows. In January 2019 these were changed to Saturday 6–10pm and Sunday 6–9pm. In September 2020 these were changed to Saturday 1–4am and Sunday 1–4am.

== Acclaim ==
In June 2005, Bull came 19th in the Radio Times survey of the forty most powerful people on radio, the highest ranked phone-in host. He was described as "a brilliant phone-in host who knows that the way to make captivating talk radio is not to rant or rage, but to create a separate world, away from the nonsense of current affairs – then invite his listeners into it. His show is the most listened-to night-time programme in London and is an understated joy," while The Independent called him "The Emperor of night-time talk radio."

The Observer said of Bull: "There's no-one quite like him. You get the impression that he's living just a bit dangerously, and that's what makes phone-ins exciting".

He has won several awards including a Bronze Sony Radio Award. The judges described him "An exception to the run-of-the-mill phone-in. It was all down to the presenter who appeared so laid back that his callers could not see how he was teasing them. A very dry sense of humour and great fun."

He won Best Talk Show Host at the New York Radio Awards in 2001.

=== Celebrity callers ===
- Peter Cook made a series of calls with the pseudonym "Sven from Swiss Cottage", a Norwegian fisherman who had come to London looking for romance and to escape the fish-obsessed phone-ins of Norway. Over time, Cook created an elaborate story of Sven's attempts to find love, or to find his estranged wife, often claiming to call from remote parts of the world where he believed his wife may have gone. These have been recorded in "Tragically I Was An Only Twin", a collection of his writings and are also available on Bull's subscription podcast. Peter Cook's former neighbour Rainbow George Weiss remained a regular caller with news of his political activities.
- Michael Barrymore once phoned in to take part in a talent contest as himself. He came seventh.
- Tony Blackburn called in to defend Smart cars.
- Bruce Mansfield (aka: Bruce Mane) is an Australian personality who is the presenter of nightline on the Australian talk radio station 3AW. He is an Australian larrikin on the show who is looking for a wife to take back to Australia.
- Jane Horrocks answered a listener's question about a movie (featured on 20 December 2005 Celebrity Callers Special).
- Patsy Palmer called in to join a discussion about Cockney accents, and on another occasion, for listeners to look out for her lost dog, which was subsequently found and returned to her (featured on 20 December 2005 Celebrity Callers Special).
- Kerry Katona called in just before leaving for I'm a Celebrity... Get Me Out of Here! when Bull wondered whether she'd had cosmetic surgery, which she said she hadn't.
- Iain Lee used to make prank calls to the show. Years later he had his own show on the station.
