= Touker Suleyman =

Cypriot-British entrepreneur (born 1953)

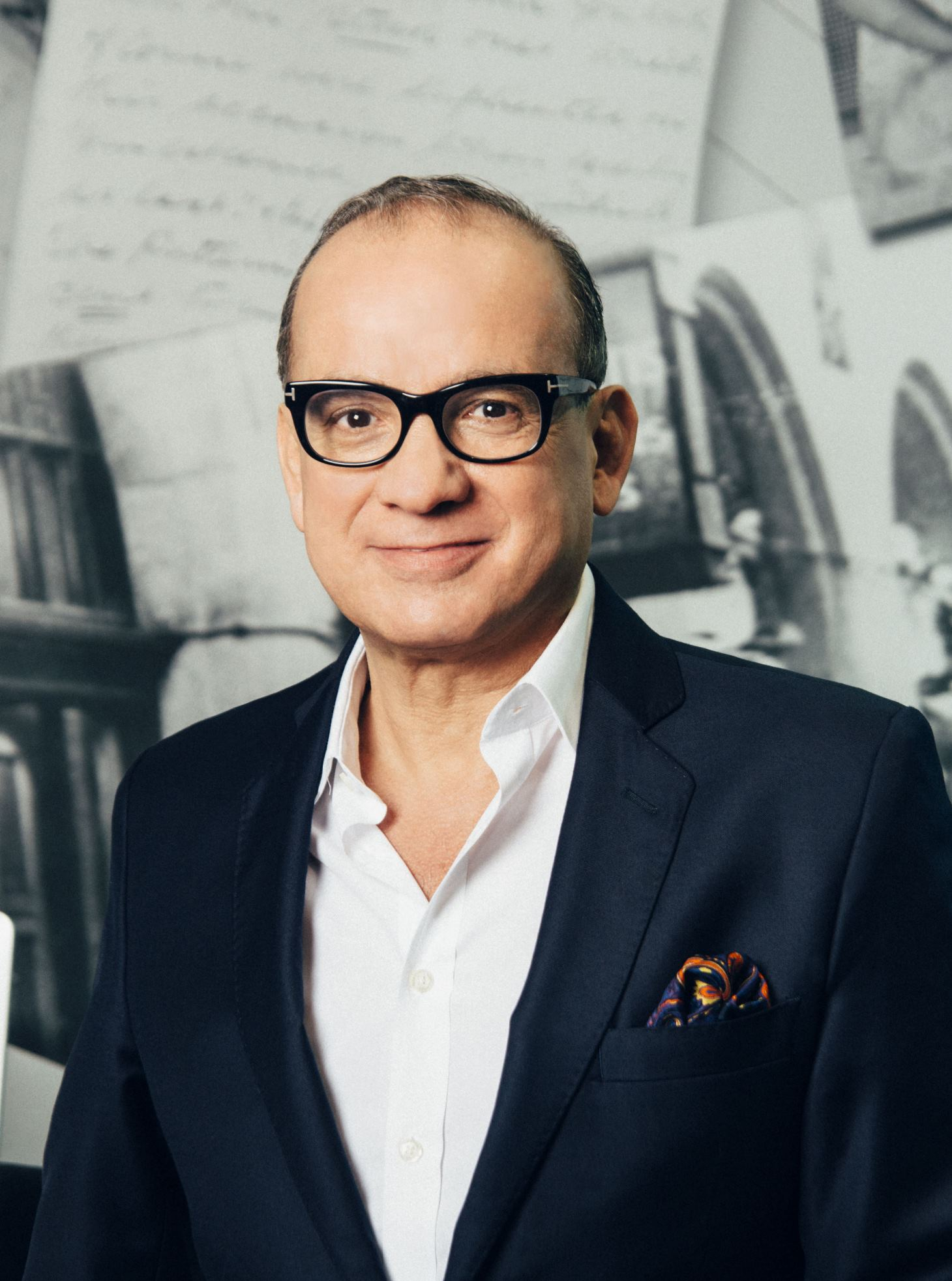
- Suleyman in 2015
- Born: Türker Süleyman; 4 August 1953 (age 72); Famagusta, British Cyprus
- Occupations: Entrepreneur; Television personality
- Children: 2
- Website: www.toukersuleyman.com

Touker Suleyman (born Türker Süleyman; 4 August 1953) is a British-Turkish Cypriot fashion retail entrepreneur, investor, and reality television personality. In 2001, his company Low Profile Group purchased UK shirt maker Hawes & Curtis, and in 2002 he purchased UK fashion label Ghost. Since then, he has invested in a number of start-up companies including Bikesoup and Huxley & Cox. Since 2015 he has been a dragon on Dragons' Den.

In 2015, The Sunday Times listed Suleyman as 637th in its Rich List, estimating his fortune to be in excess of £200 million.

== Early life ==
Suleyman was born in Famagusta on 4 August 1953, into a Turkish Cypriot family. In 1958, he moved to England with his family and settled in Bermondsey, South London. He arrived not speaking English and attended Peckham Manor secondary school. At age 10, he suffered a serious hand infection that resulted in him missing a year of school and at risk of an amputation of his left hand. Suleyman helped out working at his family's restaurant in Camberwell. He credits his father for being his inspiration to start his own business.

== Career ==
After leaving school, Suleyman joined a chartered accountancy firm in Southampton Row, London, heeding his father's wishes that he enter a secure profession. He worked as an articled clerk earning £5.50 a week. Speaking of his experience there, he stated: "I did the accounts for small clients like dentists and doctors, other accountants and small businesses. In a way it was educational, but quite boring. I saw that there were three ways to make money. You were either a pop star, in the fashion business, or in property."

While doing an audit for a clothing company, Suleyman took home some crimplene garments for his grandmother who later told him that her friends wanted the same. He purchased more, which she then sold on his behalf for about a year. He describes this incident as his introduction to the fashion business. Suleyman went in to a partnership with the manufacturer, operating out of a factory in East London before going on to form Kingsland Models which supplied clothing to the likes of C&A, Dorothy Perkins and Top Shop.

In the early 1980s, after being advised by a stockbroker, Suleyman took a 29.9% stake in clothing business Mellins. He was later persuaded by Laing & Cruickshank that Mellins should buy a stake in retailer Bamber Stores "because it offered synergy—we make it and we sell it." After Suleyman asked accountants Coopers & Lybrand to do a review, they discovered that the business had falsified their records and was £20–26 million in deficit. A board meeting was held the following Monday where Suleyman resigned, the company's shares were suspended, and receivers Cork Gully were called in. The collapse of Bamber Stores forced Suleyman to find a way to raise money or see Mellins collapse too but he was unable to find investors. Suleyman was stuck with debt and sold his house to repay money he owed to the bank.

In November 2024 he was awarded the Drapers lifetime achievement award for his 50 year career in Fashion.

=== Low Profile Group ===
In 1984, Suleyman acquired a small cash-and-carry business which subsequently became Low Profile Group, a clothing manufacturer supplying retail stores including Marks & Spencer. The company's factories are based in Turkey, Bulgaria and Georgia.

=== Hawes & Curtis ===
In 2001, Low Profile Group acquired Hawes & Curtis for £1. The company was £500,000 in debt and was about to go into administration. Turnover at Hawes & Curtis rose from £600,000 in 2001 to £30 million in 2014, whilst Suleyman retained the Chairmanship of Hawes & Curtis.

As of 2014, Hawes & Curtis operates from 30 branches in the UK and one in Cologne, Germany. In 2013, UAE investment group Korath Holding signed a $5 million deal to open 26 Hawes & Curtis stores across the Gulf over five years.

=== Ghost ===
In 2008, Suleyman purchased fashion label Ghost after its owner, KCAJ, an Icelandic investment fund, cut investment following the collapse of the Icelandic banking market. The acquisition safeguarded 142 jobs across the company.

=== Other investments ===
Alongside Ghost, Touker Suleyman has invested in Docks Rio, a casual boat shoe brand; Intelligent Futures, an online advertising start-up; Personify XP, an AI personalisation start-up; Huxley & Cox, a manufacturer of luxury handbags; and Bikesoup, an online marketplace for bicycles in which he invested £100,000 for an undisclosed stake. His current stake in the business is 46%.

=== Dragons' Den ===
In 2015, Suleyman joined the investors' panel on the thirteenth series of BBC television programme Dragons' Den, alongside Nick Jenkins and Sarah Willingham.

== Personal life ==
Suleyman was formerly married to an (unnamed) Danish woman; they have two daughters together. He lives in London, and is a non-practicing Muslim.
