= Piccadilly Palare =

Single by Morrissey

from the album Bona Drag
- B-side: "Get Off the Stage"; "At Amber"
- Released: 8 October 1990
- Length: 3:26
- Label: His Master's Voice
- Songwriters: Morrissey; Kevin Armstrong
- Producers: Clive Langer; Alan Winstanley

Morrissey singles chronology
"November Spawned a Monster" (1990)	"Piccadilly Palare" (1990)	"Our Frank" (1991)

Professional ratings
Review scores
Source	Rating
AllMusic	3/5 stars

"Piccadilly Palare" is a song by the English singer Morrissey, released as a single in October 1990 by His Master's Voice. Co-written by guitarist Kevin Armstrong, the song features one of Morrissey's former colleagues from the Smiths, Andy Rourke on bass guitar, marking the last time any former member of the Smiths would collaborate with Morrissey. (Rourke also co-wrote and plays on the B-side, "Get Off the Stage".) Backing vocals were provided by Suggs, the former lead vocalist of the ska and pop band Madness. "Piccadilly Palare" reached number 18 on the UK Singles Chart and number five in Ireland.

== Song information ==
As with "November Spawned a Monster", Morrissey chose to write about a subject unusual in pop music, namely male prostitution around the Piccadilly area of London. The title of the song refers to the cant slang language Polari, first used by male prostitutes in the 19th century and then taken up by homosexuals in the 1960s to disguise sexual activities which were illegal in the UK until 1967. Morrissey explained, "There was something oddly romantic about the whole thing. It spelt 'freedom'. Catching a coach and spending a day in Piccadilly was extraordinary".

Morrissey wrote in his 2013 autobiography that he disliked the song. He called it "...a student work of novelty that wears off before noon". In 1990, he said of the song:

It's not a particularly strong record. It's not overwhelming, the subject is even slightly dated. "Piccadilly Palare", which will receive blanket horrendous reviews, is a song about male prostitution. But I'm not running around in the street saying 'Look at me singing about male prostitution, isn't that incredibly unique!' I don't want plaudits for examining a new subject, but I will say that even coming across a pop record with a reasonably unique situation is in itself interesting.

== Critical reception ==
NME gave "Piccadilly Palare" a positive review, saying "It's amazing what a slap across the wrist can do for the creative juices." Ned Raggett of AllMusic called the song "another glam-touched chugger, its emotional heft provided by the wounded, bitter lyrics."

== Track listings ==
7-inch vinyl and cassette

1. "Piccadilly Palare"
2. "Get Off the Stage"

12-inch vinyl and CD

1. "Piccadilly Palare"
2. "At Amber" (Morrissey/Street) Produced By Stephen Street
3. "Get Off the Stage" (Morrissey/Rourke)

== Musicians ==
- Morrissey – vocals
- Kevin Armstrong – guitar
- Andy Rourke – bass guitar
- Andrew Paresi – drums
- Graham "Suggs" McPherson – backing vocals

== Charts ==
=== Weekly charts ===
Chart (1990–1991)	Peak position
Europe (Eurochart Hot 100)	51
Ireland (IRMA)	5
UK Singles (Official Charts)	18
US Alternative Airplay (Billboard)	2

=== Year-end charts ===
Chart (1991)	Position
US Modern Rock Tracks (Billboard)	29

== Release details ==
Country	Record label	Format	Catalogue number	Notes
UK	His Master's Voice	7-inch vinyl	POP1624	
UK	His Master's Voice	12-inch vinyl	12POP1624	
UK	His Master's Voice	Compact disc	CDPOP1624	
UK	His Master's Voice	Cassette	TCPOP1624	
