= Ouija Board, Ouija Board =

1989 single by Morrissey

Single by Morrissey
- B-side: "Yes, I Am Blind"; "East, West"
- Released: 13 November 1989
- Length: 4:25
- Label: His Master's Voice
- Songwriter(s): Morrissey, Stephen Street
- Producer(s): Clive Langer, Alan Winstanley

Morrissey singles chronology
"Interesting Drug" (1989)	"Ouija Board, Ouija Board" (1989)	"November Spawned a Monster" (1990)

Professional ratings
Review scores
Source	Rating
AllMusic	3/5 stars

"Ouija Board, Ouija Board" is a song by English singer-songwriter Morrissey, released as a single in November 1989. The track appears along with its B-side "Yes, I Am Blind" on the compilation album Bona Drag. A shorter edit, omitting a verse, appeared on the 2010 reissue of Bona Drag. The single was poorly received by the music press and the public; its highest position on the UK Singles Chart was No. 18, making it the first solo Morrissey single not to reach the top 10. The song was co-written by Morrisey's former producer Stephen Street, who does not produce or play on this recording (or any future Morrissey recording). B-side "Yes, I Am Blind" was composed by Morrissey's ex-Smiths partner Andy Rourke, and the picture on the sleeve was taken by Anton Corbijn.

In the song, a protagonist uses a Ouija board to contact a dead friend, who responds to him. During the era of song's release, the press claimed that it promoted occult dabbling or Satanism.

== Lyrical content ==
The song is about the protagonist using a Ouija board to contact a dead friend, who tells him to "push off" ("push oof" in some renditions). It caused some debate in the press at the time over claims it promoted occult dabbling or devil worship. Morrissey replied to these claims by retorting: "The only contact I ever made with the dead was when I spoke to a journalist from The Sun."

== Critical reception ==
Ian McCann in NME gave the single a poor review, describing the record as a "dull, fey whine that would never see release unless the singer had a track record". In a retrospective review, Ned Raggett of AllMusic described the lead track as "a weird semi-anthem that almost works" but praised its B-side "Yes, I Am Blind", calling it "a restrained but sharp performance, while the tearjerker-into-glam music is quite lovely."

== Music video ==
The video for the song, directed by Tim Broad, features Morrissey being led into the woods by some children who take him to see a spirit medium, played by Joan Sims, the British actress best known for her appearances in the Carry On film series. The video also features an early appearance by Kathy Burke. It was filmed on location in and around the Elizabethan house Hook End Manor in Checkendon, Oxfordshire, the residential studio where the song was also recorded. The video ranked third on Pulp Magazine's "Most Tweaked Music Videos of All Time" list.

== Live performances ==
Morrissey performed the song live on the 1999–2000 ¡Oye Esteban! tour. The song's distinctive introduction and end sequence had been used to bookend performances of "November Spawned a Monster" during the 1992 tour.

== Track listings ==
7-inch, POP 1622 (UK)

No.	Title	Writer(s)	Length
1.	"Ouija Board, Ouija Board"	Morrissey, Stephen Street	4:25
2.	"Yes, I Am Blind"	Morrissey, Andy Rourke	3:30

12-inch, 12 POP 1622, CD, POP 1622 (UK)

No.	Title	Writer(s)	Length
1.	"Ouija Board, Ouija Board"		4:25
2.	"Yes, I Am Blind"		3:30
3.	"East, West" (Herman's Hermits cover)	Graham Gouldman	2:35

== Musicians ==
- Morrissey: voice
- Kevin Armstrong: guitar
- Kirsty MacColl: backing vocals
- Andrew Paresi: drums
- Matthew Seligman: bass
- Steve Hopkins: piano

== Charts ==
Chart (1989)	Peak position
Europe (Eurochart Hot 100)	58
Ireland (IRMA)	4
New Zealand (Recorded Music NZ)	28
UK Singles (OCC)	18
US Alternative Airplay (Billboard)	2
