= November Spawned a Monster =

1990 single by Morrissey

Single by Morrissey

from the album Bona Drag
- B-side: "He Knows I'd Love to See Him"; "Girl Least Likely To"
- Released: 23 April 1990
- Genre: Rock
- Length: 5:25
- Label: His Master's Voice
- Songwriters: Morrissey; Clive Langer
- Producers: Clive Langer; Alan Winstanley

Morrissey singles chronology
| "Ouija Board, Ouija Board" (1989) | "November Spawned a Monster" (1990) | "Piccadilly Palare" (1990) |

Music video
- "November Spawned a Monster" on YouTube

Professional ratings
Review scores
| Source | Rating |
|---|---|
| AllMusic | 2.5/5 stars |

"November Spawned a Monster" is a song by the English singer Morrissey, released as a single in April 1990 by His Master's Voice. It was written by Morrissey and Clive Langer and features one of Morrissey's former colleagues from the Smiths, Andy Rourke, on bass guitar. The single reached number 12 on the UK Singles Chart. The track and its B-side "He Knows I'd Love to See Him" (composed by Morrissey and Rourke) appear on his compilation album Bona Drag (1990).

== Lyrics and music ==
The song describes the troubles of the disabled. Morrissey uses words such as 'monster' and 'twisted' to attempt to create mix of revulsion, sympathy and black comedy. "By forcing the ambivalent persona of tormentor and saviour, Morrissey forces the listener to confront their own prejudices head on." The song quotes the French poetic novel Les Chants de Maldoror (Chant 2, verse 7), in which a hermaphrodite perceives himself as a monster and dreams of love.

The song features backing vocals from Mary Margaret O'Hara. Morrissey said in a 1990 interview, "She's the oddest most eccentric person I've ever met, I went into the vocal booth and said 'Just simply give birth', which she most expertly did, while I stood behind with a mop and a bucket".

== Critical reception ==
Steven Wells in NME gave the single a negative review, stating that "Morrissey repeats his one tune endlessly" and that the single showed a "drying up of the old creative gastrics". In a retrospective review, Ned Raggett of AllMusic called the title track "one of the most powerful of Morrissey's solo career, with a relentless, just off-kilter enough rock chug supporting an empathetic lyric about a young girl suffering from physical deformity." Raggett also praised the B-sides "He Knows I'd Love to See Him" and "Girl Least Likely To", writing that the former contains "some of his clearest lyrics on gay life in the face of official disapproval" and the latter emerges as the "surprise winner, even stronger than the title track." Author Johnny Rogan stated in his book Morrissey – The Albums: "By forcing the ambivalent persona of tormentor and saviour, Morrissey forces the listener to confront their own prejudices head on."

== Live performances ==
Morrissey performed the song live on his 1991, 1992, 1999–2000, 2002, 2004, 2013, and 2016 tours.

== Track listings ==
7-inch vinyl

1. "November Spawned a Monster"
2. "He Knows I'd Love to See Him"

12-inch vinyl, compact disc and cassette

1. "November Spawned a Monster"
2. "He Knows I'd Love to See Him" (Morrissey, Kevin Armstrong)
3. "Girl Least Likely To" (Morrissey, Andy Rourke)

== Musicians ==
- Morrissey – voice
- Mary Margaret O'Hara – voice
- Kevin Armstrong – guitar
- Andy Rourke – bass guitar
- Andrew Paresi – drums

== Charts ==
| Chart (1990) | Peak position |
|---|---|
| Europe (Eurochart Hot 100) | 30 |
| Ireland (IRMA) | 9 |
| New Zealand (Recorded Music NZ) | 40 |
| UK Singles (Official Charts) | 12 |
| US Alternative Airplay (Billboard) | 6 |

== Release details ==
| Region | Record label | Format | Catalogue number | Notes |
|---|---|---|---|---|
| UK | His Master's Voice | 7-inch vinyl | POP1623 | |
| UK | His Master's Voice | 12-inch vinyl | 12POP1623 | |
| UK | His Master's Voice | Compact disc | CDPOP1623 | |
| UK | His Master's Voice | Cassette | TCPOP1623 | |

== Play ==
In November 2014, Alex Broun's play November Spawned a Monster, inspired by Morrissey's song, premiered at The Old Fitzroy, in Sydney, Australia, directed by Robert Chuter and starring James Wright.
