= Katharine Hamnett =

English fashion designer (born 1947)

Katharine Hamnett CBE
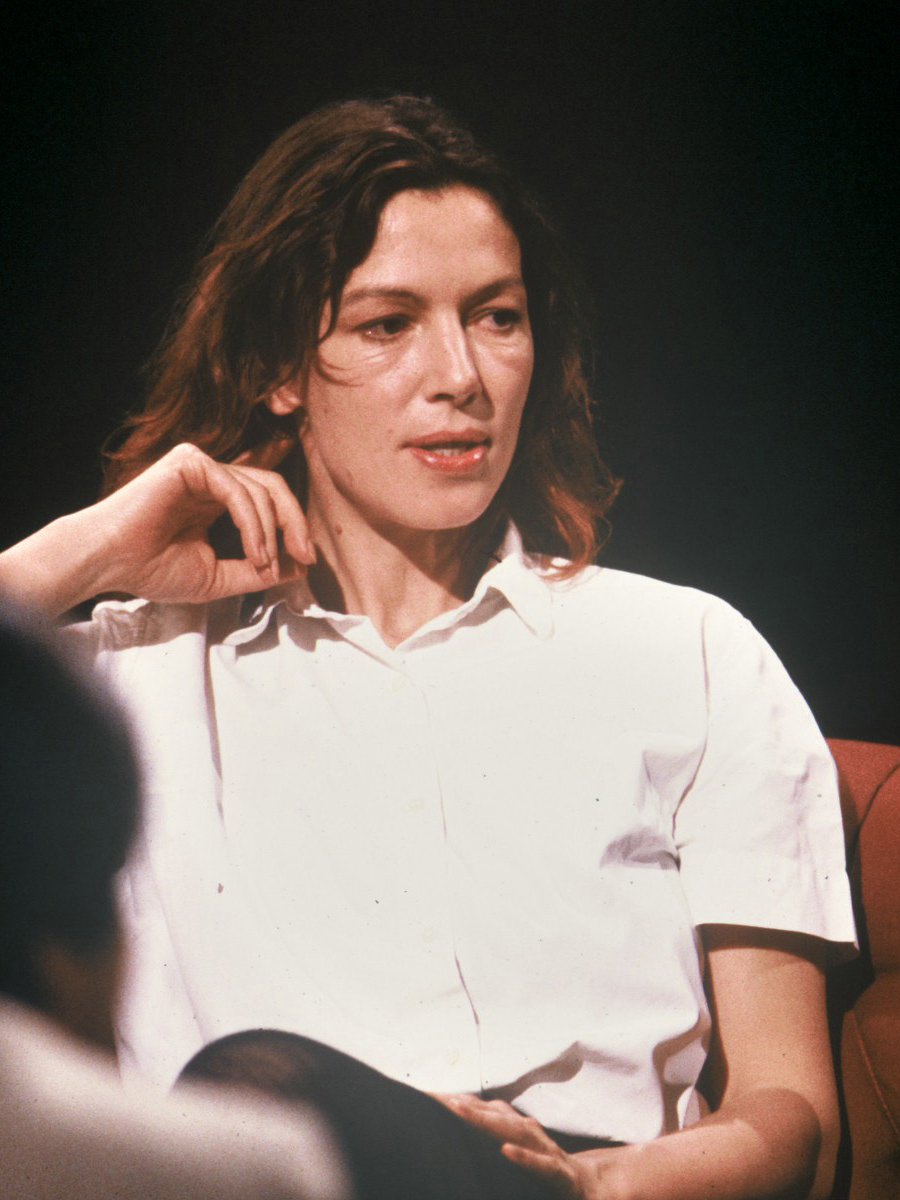
- Hamnett appearing on TV discussion After Dark "You Are What You Wear" in 1988
- Born: Katharine Eleanor Appleton; 16 August 1947 (age 79); Gravesend, Kent, England
- Education: Cheltenham Ladies' College
- Alma mater: Saint Martin's School of Art
- Occupation: Fashion designer
- Known for: Political T-shirts
- Spouse(s): Richard Hamnett; Jeffrey Pine
- Children: 2

Katharine Eleanor Hamnett (née Appleton; born 16 August 1947) is an English fashion designer best known for her political T-shirts.

== Early life ==
Hamnett was born on 16 August 1947 in Gravesend, Kent, the daughter of James Appleton, a group captain. She attended Cheltenham Ladies' College.

== Career ==
Hamnett graduated from Saint Martin's School of Art. She set up Tuttabankem with Anne Buck in 1969. From 1975, she was a freelance fashion designer in London, Paris, Milan, New York and Hong Kong until she founded the Katharine E. Hamnett clothes label in 1979.

=== Media exposure ===
Hamnett's oversized T-shirts with large block letter slogans, launched in 1983, were adopted by pop bands, including Wham!. George Michael wore his white "CHOOSE LIFE" shirt in the music video for "Wake Me Up Before You Go-Go". The T-shirt also appeared in Queen's video for "Hammer to Fall" (worn by Roger Taylor). Taylor wore Hamnett's "WORLDWIDE NUCLEAR BAN NOW" shirt during Queen's historic appearance at the first edition of the Rock in Rio festival in Rio de Janeiro, Brazil.

In 1984, ZTT's Paul Morley designed a series of "FRANKIE SAY..." T-shirts to promote the record label's chart act Frankie Goes to Hollywood (FGTH). Morley has stated that these designs were consciously based on Hamnett's slogan T-shirts: "What persuaded me was reading Katharine Hamnett saying she wanted the T-shirts ripped off, which reminded me of Mark P, saying he wanted Sniffin' Glue to be ripped off. And I mean, I did a fanzine, so when I read that I thought, great, fanzine T-shirts!" The official FGTH designs were particularly successful, and spawned many imitations of their own.

Models such as Naomi Campbell have appeared in Hamnett shirts bearing the slogans "USE A CONDOM" and "PEACE".

Hamnett viewed her T-shirts as a way of getting her message across: "If you want to get the message out there, you should print it in giant letters on a t-shirt." Her first shirt featured the "CHOOSE LIFE" slogan. Inspired by a Buddhist exhibit, it was a comment against war, death and destruction. Hamnett has spoken out several times against the slogan's use by anti-abortion activists in the U.S. She wrote on her website, "It's not about the anti-abortion lobby. The US anti-abortion lobby attempted to appropriate CHOOSE LIFE. We are taking it back and promoting its real meaning. Ours is authentic and I believe in a woman's right to choose."

In 2015, Hamnett designed a T-shirt reading CHOOSE LOVE for the charity Help Refugees (which is now known as Choose Love).

Outside her own label, in 1984 Hamnett was involved in the founding of Tanya Sarne's Ghost label.

== Political activism ==
Since 1989, with research showing pesticide poisoning in cotton-growing regions, and sweatshop labour a major part of the textiles industry, Hamnett has lobbied for major changes in the way the industry operated. After disappointment with the results, Hamnett terminated most of her licensing arrangements, and in 2005 relaunched her line under stricter ethical guidelines, including manufacturing and agricultural practices.

In 2003, at a London fashion show, Hamnett's catwalk models wore shirts with "STOP WAR, BLAIR OUT", a reference to the looming invasion of Iraq.

In 2008, Hamnett said that fashion designers participating in the London Fashion Week were racist due to what she views as increasing exclusion of black models, stating:

The catwalks are full of white dogs, cosmetic companies don't like black models – the racist bitches. I have no idea why when it's obvious that black girls are just so genuinely much more beautiful than Caucasians, who have clearly got the short straw. Black girls have much better body shapes and it's such a shame. I just think there should be a bit more of a balance.

In 2013, Hamnett designed two different T-shirts for the Campaign for Nuclear Disarmament: "EDUCATION NOT TRIDENT" and "NHS NOT TRIDENT". As an additional sign of her commitment to the anti-nuclear cause, Hamnett joined the 55th edition of the Easter demonstration at Aldermaston, on 1 April 2013.

Hamnett was one of several celebrities who endorsed the parliamentary candidacy of the Green Party's Caroline Lucas at the 2015 general election.

In December 2025, with a video message on her Instagram page, Hamnett launched a T-shirt with the message "Free Marwan", referring to Palestinian prisoner of Israel Marwan Barghouti. The shirt is a collaboration with Lina Hadid and Marwan Barghouti's son, Arab Barghouti.

In February 2024, Hamnett publicly relinquished her Commander of the Order of the British Empire (CBE) distinction in protest against the UK government's support for the war in Gaza. Wearing a T-shirt reading "DISGUSTED TO BE BRITISH" in her trademark all-caps font, the designer said "I'm disgusted to be British for our role in Gaza," brandishing her CBE and placing it in a rubbish bin.

=== "58% Don't Want Pershing" t-shirt ===
In 1984, during the Downing Street reception to mark the inaugural London Fashion Week, Hamnett met with then-Prime Minister Margaret Thatcher wearing her own T-shirt with the slogan "58% DON'T WANT PERSHING", the anti-Tory policy reference to polls showing public opposition in the United Kingdom against the basing of Pershing II missiles in the country.

Hamnett knew that the reception would be a powerful photo opportunity and so created the t-shirt in anticipation of meeting Thatcher. She has said that her fellow young fashion designers hated Thatcher "for everything she had done to the UK" with her friend fellow designer Jasper Conran saying, "Why should I go and share a glass of white wine with that murderess?".

Hamnett created the t-shirt in her office a few hours before the reception. The actual t-shirt used had been made by another designer prior to Hamnett's application of the text. She felt that the t-shirt looked good when photographed but was "hideous in the flesh" as the lettering was laid out in Letraset and then exposed onto photosensitive linen. The slogan refers to an opinion poll of Europeans about the siting of the American nuclear MGM-31 Pershing missile in Europe. Hamnett felt that "Wearing that on a T-shirt was the best thing I could think of at the time". The typeface for the t-shirt was taken from The Sun newspaper, chosen for its visibility.

She wore the t-shirt under her jacket and refused to take her jacket off at her arrival at 10 Downing Street, claiming she was cold. After lining up with the other designers she opened her jacket to reveal the t-shirt as she shook Thatcher's hand. Hamnett said the press photographers "went crazy with their flashbulbs". Thatcher said to Hamnett "You seem to be wearing a rather strong message on your T-shirt" and "let out a squawk, like a chicken" after reading it. Thatcher was also reported to have exclaimed "At last we have an original" after seeing the t-shirt. Hamnett subsequently followed Thatcher around the cocktail reception trying to speak to her about "the huge problem of acid rain in Scandinavia as a result of coal burning" but Thatcher repeatedly evaded her "like a game of cat and mouse". At the end of the evening Hamnett was the last attendee in the room with Thatcher who finally told her that "I am a scientist and I don't know what causes acid rain". Following the reception Hamnett went to a party at Conran's house where her friends cheered her arrival as they had seen her meeting Thatcher on television that night.

Dazed magazine described the protest as "embedded in culture way beyond fashion".

=== Monsanto ===
In June 2014, Hamnett joined Nimrod Kamer to perform a stunt outside Hackney Town Hall, aiming to make Hackney Mayor Jules Pipe ban the weedkiller Monsanto Roundup being used in the borough.

Hamnett announced in December 2025 that she had joined the Green Party, and launched a T-shirt collaboration with its leader Zack Polanski.

== Personal life ==
Hamnett has been married twice, to Richard Hamnett, a graphic designer, and to Jeffrey Pine, a painter. She has two sons.

== Awards and honours ==
Hamnett won the first ever British Fashion Awards, and in 1996, was voted Britain's favourite designer by readers of Cosmopolitan. Hamnett was appointed Commander of the Order of the British Empire (CBE) in the 2011 New Year Honours, for services to the fashion industry. She renounced the honour in February 2024 in response to her perceived lack of action by the British Government in the war in Gaza.
