= Kevin Armstrong (guitarist) =

English rock guitarist, record producer and songwriter (born 1958)

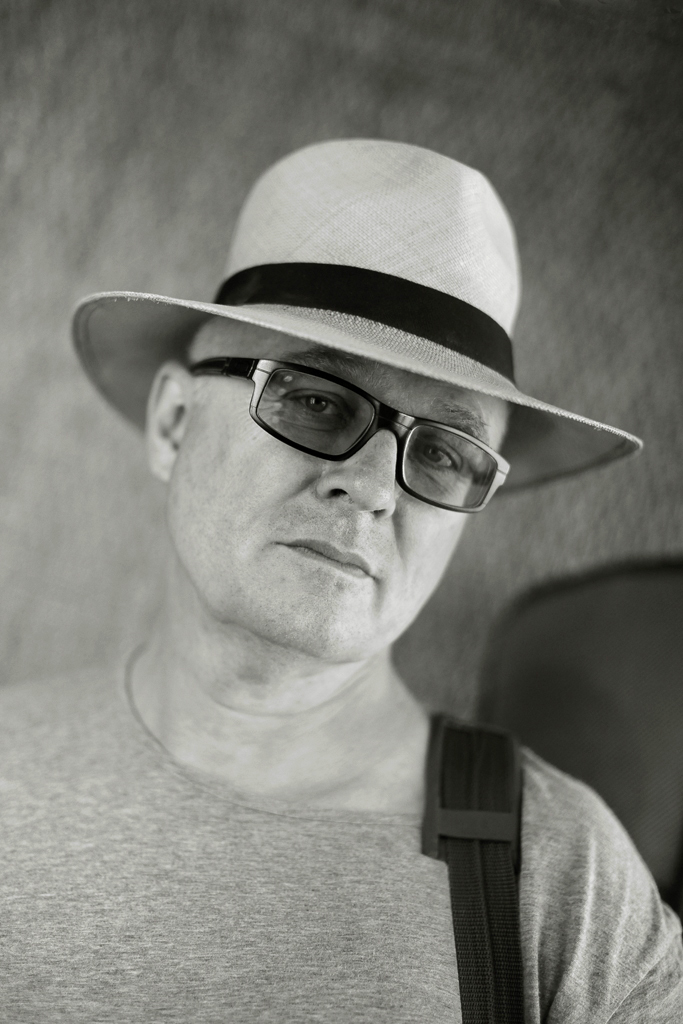
Armstrong in 2014

Kevin Armstrong (born 2 February 1958) is an English rock guitarist, record producer and songwriter, best known for his work with David Bowie, Iggy Pop, Morrissey and Thomas Dolby.

== History ==
Born in Farnborough, Kent, Armstrong attended St. Mary Cray Primary School and St. Olave's Grammar School, Orpington, Kent.

Armstrong was signed by Charlie Gillett's Oval Records in 1980 and formed the group Local Heroes SW9 - as they were living in Stockwell, London - (with Matthew Seligman on bass and Kim Barti on drums) and released two albums, Drip Dry Zone in 1980 and New Opium in 1981.

Armstrong recorded with Thomas Dolby on his first two albums The Golden Age of Wireless and The Flat Earth.

Armstrong took part in the recording of The Passions's third album Sanctuary, produced by Mick Glossop. The first single from that album was "Jump for Joy", which was released on 5 May 1982, followed by the album and the "Sanctuary" single on 18 September 1982.

Armstrong collaborated with David Bowie on the soundtrack for the film Absolute Beginners. He also played in the band for David Bowie's Live Aid appearance in 1985, and recorded the song "Dancing In The Street" with David Bowie and Mick Jagger.

On the 1985 album Steve McQueen by Prefab Sprout, Armstrong played lead guitar on "Hallelujah" and "Desire As", and joined the band as a full-time second guitarist for their Summer 1985 UK Tour. He also contributed to the band's live John Peel BBC Session on the tracks "Rebel Land", "Goodbye Lucille Number 1", and "Cars and Girls".

He played guitar on the Iggy Pop 1986 album Blah Blah Blah and was musical director for Iggy Pop's world tour in 1986/87.

Armstrong joined Steve Nieve's band for the Jonathan Ross Channel 4 chat show The Last Resort for two seasons in 1989, accompanying Paul McCartney.

In 1989, David Bowie asked Armstrong to join Tin Machine as the fifth member after he played on the debut album recorded in Switzerland and the Bahamas.

In 1992, he co-wrote the title track of David Bowie's Outside album, with Bowie.

Armstrong was a co-songwriter ("Piccadilly Palare", "He Knows I'd Love To See Him" and "Oh Phoney") and guitarist for Morrissey for some of the recordings that appeared on the album Bona Drag produced by Clive Langer. In 1992 he produced the debut album by Nigerian artist Keziah Jones for Delabel France entitled Blufunk Is a Fact. Later he produced other albums for Jones, Black Orpheus (2004), Nigerian Wood (2008) and Captain Rugged (2013).

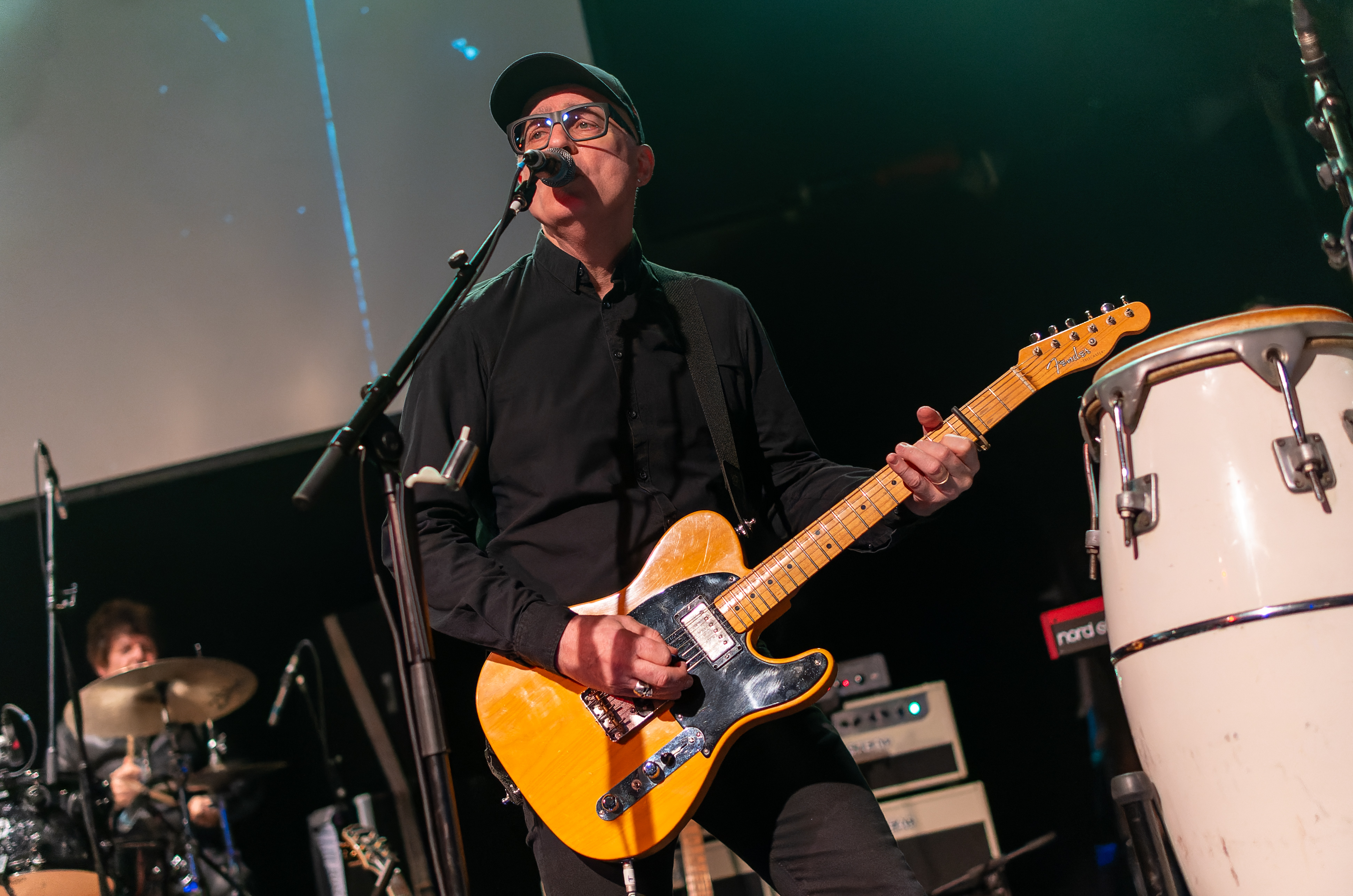
Armstrong performing with Lust for Life in 2024

In 2007, he was guitarist on a world tour with Sinéad O'Connor and, in 2010, he played on new material with Thomas Dolby and toured the world in 2012 as Dolby's guitarist. In 2015/6, he put together and led the band for Iggy Pop's live appearances worldwide. In 2019, Armstrong released the album Run on Wishing Tree Records. A 2020 American tour with a band of all David Bowie alumni headed by Mike Garson called A Bowie Celebration was interrupted because of the coronavirus crisis.

Armstrong went on tour with the D.A.M. Triology honouring David Bowie and Dennis Davis. The show ran in Europe from Nov 7, 2025 till Dec 1,2025. The title of the show is Back to Berlin covering Low, Heroes and Lodger.
