= Nev Fountain =

English writer

- Born: Steven John Fountain; 12 August 1969 (age 57); Stamford, England
- Occupation: Writer
- Partner: Nicola Bryant

Nev Fountain, born Steven John Fountain (born 12 August 1969), is an English writer best known for his comedy work with writing partner Tom Jamieson on the radio and television programme Dead Ringers.

== Early life ==
A native of Stamford, Fountain attended the University of Warwick.

== Career ==
While working at a series of odd jobs in London, Fountain wrote a few fringe plays, including one called My Grandmother Is a Time Lord, produced in 1995. In the same year, he began writing sketches for the radio programme Week Ending. It was while working on Week Ending that he met Tom Jamieson, with whom he has written most of his subsequent radio and television work.

Fountain and Jamieson contributed to many radio and television comedy programmes, including Have I Got News for You, 2DTV, The News Quiz, Loose Ends and Big Impression. Their most notable work, however, has been for Dead Ringers in which Fountain occasionally makes cameo appearances. The pair are also responsible for the historical comedy Elephants to Catch Eels and wrote "Txt Mssg Rcvd", a 2005 episode of the BBC Three anthology series Twisted Tales.

=== Private Eye ===
Fountain is also a staff writer on Private Eye magazine.

=== Doctor Who ===
Fountain is a fan of Doctor Who and is the partner of Nicola Bryant who played Peri Brown in the series from 1984 to 1986. Fountain has contributed to several audio dramas based on the programme. His first licensed Doctor Who work was as script editor on the webcast Death Comes to Time. He has also written several Doctor Who audio plays for Big Finish Productions, including Omega, The Kingmaker, and Peri and the Piscon Paradox. In addition, he wrote the narration script for the DVD documentary "The Last Chance Saloon" about the casting of Sylvester McCoy in the role in 1987. He appears occasionally as a host or MC at Doctor Who conventions.

In 2020, Radio Times announced that Fountain had adapted the audio story The Doomsday Contract for Big Finish, which had been originally pitched to the television series by comedy producer John Lloyd while Douglas Adams had been its script editor.

=== Novelist ===
Fountain is also the author of several humorous detective novels and one serious thriller.

His first three detective books, collectively titled 'The Mervyn Stone Mysteries', were published by Big Finish Productions in 2010 and recount the exploits of an ex-script editor of a science fiction television series called Vixens from the Void. Mervyn Stone encounters murders wherever he goes, whether it be a sci-fi convention (Geek Tragedy), the recording of a DVD commentary (DVD Extras Include: Murder) or the revival of the aforesaid television series (Cursed Among Sequels). He was played by John Banks in the audio adventure, The Axeman Cometh. In 2024 he launched a new detective series, 'The Kit Pelham Mysteries', that link to the Mervyn Stone series. The first volume, The Fan Who Knew Too Much, introduces Pelham, a podcaster and sci-fi superfan, who investigates the murder of her friend, also a podcaster, who promised to reveal secrets about Vixen from the Void, the TV show script-edited by Mervyn Stone. A second book, Lies and Dolls, was published in August 2025.

The serious thriller, published by Sphere as by "N.J. Fountain" is called Painkiller and recounts the story of Monica Wood, a woman suffering from chronic neuropathic pain who discovers her own suicide note in a drawer - but she cannot remember writing it. The audiobook version was performed by Nicola Bryant.

== Personal life ==
He lives in Shalford, Surrey with his partner Nicola Bryant.

== Bibliography ==
=== Books ===
- The Mervyn Stone Mysteries:
  - Geek Tragedy (Big Finish, 2010)
  - DVD Extras Include: Murder (Big Finish, 2010)
  - Cursed Among Sequels (Big Finish, 2010)
- Painkiller (Sphere, 2016)
- The Kit Pelham Mysteries:
  - The Fan Who Knew Too Much (Titan Books, 2024)
  - Lies and Dolls (Titan Books, 2025)

=== Audio ===
- Doctor Who:
  - Omega (August 2003)
  - The Kingmaker (April 2006)
  - The Companion Chronicles: Peri and the Piscon Paradox (January 2011)
  - Destiny of the Doctor: Trouble in Paradise (June 2013)
  - Breaking Bubbles and Other Stories – "The Curious Incident of the Doctor in the Night-Time" (July 2014)
  - The Widow's Assassin (October 2014)
  - The Diary of River Song series 3: The Lady in the Lake (January 2018)
  - Missy series 1: The Broken Clock (February 2019)
  - Blood on Santa's Claw and Other Stories (December 2019)
  - The Sixth Doctor and Peri Volume 01 – "Conflict Theory" (August 2020)
  - The Lost Stories: The Doomsday Contract (March 2021)
  - The Sixth Doctor Adventures: Bad Terms – "Red for Danger!" (August 2025)
  - The Sixth Doctor Adventures: Expulsion – "The Reckoning" (April 2026)
- The New Adventures of Bernice Summerfield:
  - 'The Revolution' (June 2014)
- Vienna:
  - Bad Faith (February 2014)
- The Confessions of Dorian Gray:
  - The Immortal Game (August 2013)
- Dark Shadows:
  - The Eternal Actress (May 2012)
  - The Darkest Shadow (June 2014)
- The Mervyn Stone Mysteries:
  - The Axeman Cometh (June 2013)
