= Iain Finlayson (journalist) =

Scottish writer and journalist

Iain Finlayson (born 1945) is a Scottish writer and journalist.

Finlayson has written biographies of James Boswell and Robert Browning, as well as books about Romney Marsh, the Scots, denim and Tangier.

He was books editor of Saga Magazine, and reviewed books for The Times.

Under the collective pseudonym Matthew McAllister, he and Simon Burt have written a crime novel, Blood Month, published electronically under their imprint Atrium Editions.

Iain Finlayson lives & works in Hay-on-Wye, Wales.

== Works ==
- Winston Churchill, 1980
- The moth and the candle: a life of James Boswell, 1984
- The sixth continent: a literary history of Romney Marsh, 1986
- The Scots: a portrait of the Scottish soul at home and abroad, 1987
- Denim: an American legend, 1990
- Tangier: city of the dream, 1992
- Browning: a private life, 2003
- (with Simon Burt, as Matthew McAllister) Blood Month, 2012
