= Normal for Norfolk =

Pejorative slang term for abnormality

Normal for Norfolk (or NFN) is a slang term used in some parts of England for something that is peculiar, or odd.

The term comes from medical slang created by doctors to insult their patients. Utilised by doctors and Social Services in Norfolk and elsewhere to depict patients of lesser intellect, some were moved to record the letters 'NFN' against the personal details of certain clients, where they were considered to be a bit strange or had peculiar habits. According to the urban myth, such clients were so common in that area that they were considered normal as far as Norfolk was concerned.

The term is considered derogatory because it portrays people from Norfolk as normally being strange or peculiar, with an implication that they are in-bred. The portrayal of people from Norfolk in this light is a common stereotype in England.

Within Norfolk itself, the phrase may also be known as "Normal for Wisbech", which is in neighbouring Cambridgeshire. Most areas of the country have a regional variation of NFN, e.g. in North-West England, NFS (Normal for Stoke) may be heard.

Normal for Norfolk, was the title of a BBC series, about farmer Desmond MacCarthy, trying to keep Wiveton Hall, his 17th Century manor house, going. This ran for 2 series, of 4 episodes and 6 episodes respectively, in 2016 and 2018.
