= Morrissey: 25 Live =

- DVD cover art
- Directed by: James Russell
- Based on: Morrissey's March 2, 2013, live performance at Hollywood High School in Los Angeles
- Produced by: Vicki Betihavas
- Starring: Morrissey; Boz Boorer; Anthony Burulcich; Jesse Tobias
- Cinematography: Nick Wheeler
- Edited by: Simon Bryant; Nick Meddings
- Music by: Morrissey
- Production companies: Eagle Rock Entertainment; Nineteen Fifteen Productions
- Distributed by: SpectiCast Entertainment; Film1 Sundance Channel; Eagle Rock Entertainment
- Release date: August 23, 2013 (United Kingdom)
- Running time: 92 minutes
- Country: United States
- Language: English

Morrissey: 25 Live is a 2013 music concert film documentary depicting Morrissey's March 2, 2013, live performance at Hollywood High School in Los Angeles, California. The concert was intended to mark his 25-year solo career following the break-up of the Smiths. The film focused on Morrissey as a performer, rather than as a man.

== Background ==
Marking Morrissey's 25th anniversary as a solo performer, the concert took place at Hollywood High School the day after his sold-out concert at Staples Center. The location was the smallest venue of the year's tour, and tickets for the Hollywood High venue sold out in 12 seconds. According to William Morris Agency, ticket outlet systems were so jammed it took 45 minutes to acknowledge those successful ticket purchases which were made within the first 12 seconds of them becoming available.

The film was produced by Nineteen Fifteen and Eagle Rock Productions, and was distributed by Eagle Rock. Initially released as a theatrical/cinema release August–October 2013 in Europe, North America, and Australia, Morrissey: 25 Live was Morrissey's first authorized concert film recording since 2004's Who Put the M in Manchester?

== Concert ==
Performing artists included Morrissey, Boz Boorer, Anthony Burulcich, and Jesse Tobias. The evening's opening act was by Kristeen Young, whose 30-minute set was interspersed with the crowd demanding Morrissey's appearance, followed by a video explaining fish suffocating. Guest appearances included Russell Brand, who delivered a rambling introductory monologue, and Patti Smith, who gave a well-received, hour-long set of her own before Morrissey came on stage. Her set included "Dancing Barefoot", "April Fool", and "Because the Night". She closed her set with "Gloria".

The show's banner dropped just before 10 PM to reveal Morrissey and his band. The first songs they performed were "Alma Matters" and "Ouija Board, Ouija Board". At the conclusion of "November Spawned a Monster", Morrissey addressed the audience, and invited fans to speak. He handed his microphone to front-row attendees, who spoke his praises. After being handed the microphone, fans offered verbal adulation: a woman thanked him for enriching the lives of her and her children, and the man next to her thanked Morrissey for the life lessons he had shared. Representative of the effect he has had on his fans, during the performance of "Maladjusted" a fan passed forward a handmade poster featuring Morrissey's photo with the caption, "Class of 1977 – best hair". When the concert was finished, the support band introduced themselves one by one and declared they were "playing 'for Morrissey'".

== DVD ==
The concert DVD opened with a series of short clips in which fans expressed their love for the singer. Russell Brand's introductory monologue appears as a DVD extra, he and Patti Smith were seen in brief cutaways and inserts during an opening montage. During the film, Morrissey's performance of "Let Me Kiss You" was interspersed with effective, mood-enhancing jump cuts. Birmingham Mail felt that while at 54, Morrissey looked more like a politician than a rock star, his performances of songs such as "Meat Is Murder", "Everyday Is Like Sunday", "Please, Please, Please, Let Me Get What I Want", and "The Boy with the Thorn in His Side" gave enough evidence to suggest he "could still grow all over you if you let him".

Songs played:

1. "Alma Matters"
2. "Ouija Board, Ouija Board"
3. "Irish Blood, English Heart"
4. "You Have Killed Me"
5. "November Spawned a Monster"
6. "Maladjusted"
7. "You're the One for Me, Fatty"
8. "Still Ill"
9. "People Are the Same Everywhere"
10. "Speedway"
11. "That Joke Isn't Funny Anymore"
12. "To Give (The Reason I Live)"
13. "Meat Is Murder"
14. "Please, Please, Please, Let Me Get What I Want"
15. "Action Is My Middle Name"
16. "Everyday Is Like Sunday"
17. "I'm Throwing My Arms Around Paris"
18. "Let Me Kiss You"
19. "The Boy with the Thorn in His Side"

DVD extras include

1. "The Kid's a Looker (Studio in Session)"
2. "Scandinavia (Studio in Session)"
3. "Action Is My Middle Name (Studio in Session)"
4. "People Are the Same Everywhere (Studio in Session)"
5. "Behind the Scenes at Hollywood High"
6. "Grissle Bandage Presents Lord Mudslide"

== Critical response ==
On Rotten Tomatoes the film has a rating of 56% based on reviews from 9 critics.

Time Out London noted it as a basic concert film which included testimonies from his fans. They wrote that "even if the performances range from rousing to ropey, watching the cult of Mozza in action still offers some unintended pleasures", and concluded, "A few numbers – 'Irish Blood, English Heart', 'Everyday Is Like Sunday' – are delivered with fire, but too often we're witnessing messianic gestures without the accompanying miracles". The Birmingham Mail generally praised the film, writing of its theatrical release, "This new film reveals his skills as a lyricist and the undeniable talent of a brilliant band, but is frustratingly one-dimensional".

The Hollywood Reporter offered that the Hollywood High location "was well-suited to a cult British singer who has long been fascinated with vintage Tinseltown glamour". Explaining that he is a performer known for his "provocative public statements and witty, literate, emotionally charged lyrics", The Hollywood Reporter shared that Morrissey has a fiercely dedicated fan base. The actual performance was introduced enthusiastically by Morrissey's friend Russell Brand; however, Brand's speech was cut from the completed film. Brand and celebrities such as Patti Smith were, however, included in an opening montage. "Lacking in context or personal insights", the film is generally "a straight record of the concert", shot from multiple angles and with a "glossy cinematic look". While the film was otherwise visually conventional, it did offer occasional twists that were "the exception rather than the rule".

The Guardian noted the film opening with black and white footage of Morrissey backstage and accolades from attending fans. The review opined that Morrissey's voice was in best form and that he has a "showbiz veteran's confidence and craft". The project was well lit and "filmed in a hectic style replete with unusual angles and flashy jump-cuts". It was felt it captured "the fervour that only a Morrissey gig can provide, and it's simultaneously moving, exciting and funny when the somewhat stout singer rips off his sweaty shirt and throws it to the ravenous crowd – twice."

Critic Robbie Collin of The Telegraph panned the film, writing, "Quibbling and prevarication be damned: Morrissey 25: Live is the worst concert film I have ever seen". Admitting his words were strong, Collins explained that director James Russell's picture so efficiently "makes its subject look like a thundering bozo" that viewers could conclude it was funded by either the various musicians Morrissey "has insulted over the years, maybe, or a coalition of angry butchers". Collin wrote that after the film's first three songs, he was waiting for a cut-away or an archive montage or inserts that would share more about the singer as a person, but "[n]ine songs later, Morrissey is still pacing the stage dressed like a hairdresser on a package tour, and we finally give up hope".

Empire Online generally praised the film, giving it four out of five stars. They noted that in its focus on Morrissey as a performer rather than as a man, the location of Hollywood High School was fitting for the "prickly poet laureate of the bedsit malcontent". They felt that while director Russell's claim of "elevating the convention of the concert movie to new cinematic heights" was somewhat exaggerated, the film remained "an imaginatively conveyed rock performance by an elusive icon".

Digital Spy felt the film would be best loved by hardcore Morrissey fans. The star "seems to hover uncomfortably between unemployment, illness and retirement", and "the concert sometimes feels more like a farewell than an anniversary. As the man himself says, the microphone is his tombstone. Morrissey 25: Live isn't really the send-off he deserves. But fingers crossed he's got enough in him yet that he won't be in need of a better one for a very long time".

DVD Verdict wrote that the "best thing about Morrissey 25 is that it's well-filmed in front of a smallish audience". It was also noted that director Russell's use of multiple cameras and multiple points of view set this documentary apart from "those skimpy concert documentaries that put two cameras up front and one in back, languidly cutting between them". Regarding the singer's facial expressions, upraised arms, and dance steps, Morrissey is referred to as "an expressive performer". The director's synchronized movement of cuts between the performer and his fans in time with the music offered "compelling shots of Moz and his audience". The second best feature of the film was its live sound, creating "the perfect blend of Morrissey's voice, the band's music, and the audience's enthusiastic response", without having the "dry, distant quality that overly scrubbed live recordings often get". A flaw found in the film was how it was aimed directly at the target audience of "Moz's rabid fan base".
