= Satan Rejected My Soul =

Single by Morrissey

from the album Maladjusted
- B-side: "Now I Am a Was"; "This Is Not Your Country"
- Released: 29 December 1997 (UK)
- Genre: Alternative rock
- Length: 2:56
- Label: Island (UK)
- Songwriters: Morrissey, Boz Boorer
- Producer: Steve Lillywhite

Morrissey singles chronology
| "Roy's Keen" (1997) | "Satan Rejected My Soul" (1997) | "Irish Blood, English Heart" (2004) |

"Satan Rejected My Soul" is a song by Morrissey, released as a single in December 1997. It was the third single to be taken from the Maladjusted album.

The single reached number 39 on the UK Singles Chart—an improvement on the preceding "Roy's Keen". This was the last single released by Morrissey on Island Records, and his last single at all until May 2004.

The song features in the BBC sitcom Catterick, starring Vic and Bob, mimed to by Reece Shearsmith.

== Track listings ==
=== 7" vinyl and cassette (UK) ===
1. "Satan Rejected My Soul"
2. "Now I Am a Was"

On UK 7" and cassette, the three songs are listed on the front cover, even if "This Is Not Your Country" is only on the 12".

=== 12" vinyl and CD ===
1. "Satan Rejected My Soul"
2. "Now I Am a Was"
3. "This Is Not Your Country"

| Country | Record label | Format | Catalogue number |
|---|---|---|---|
| UK | Island | 7" vinyl | IS686 |
| UK | Island | 12" vinyl | 12IS686 |
| UK | Island | Compact disc | CID686 |
| UK | Island | Cassette | CIS686 |

== Reception ==
In his review for AllMusic Ned Raggett described the song as " a casual, fun number."

== Musicians ==
- Morrissey: voice
- Martin Boorer: guitar
- Alain Whyte: guitar
- Jonny Bridgwood: bass
- Spencer James Cobrin: drums

== See also ==
- Morrissey discography
