= Morrissey =

English singer and songwriter (born 1959)

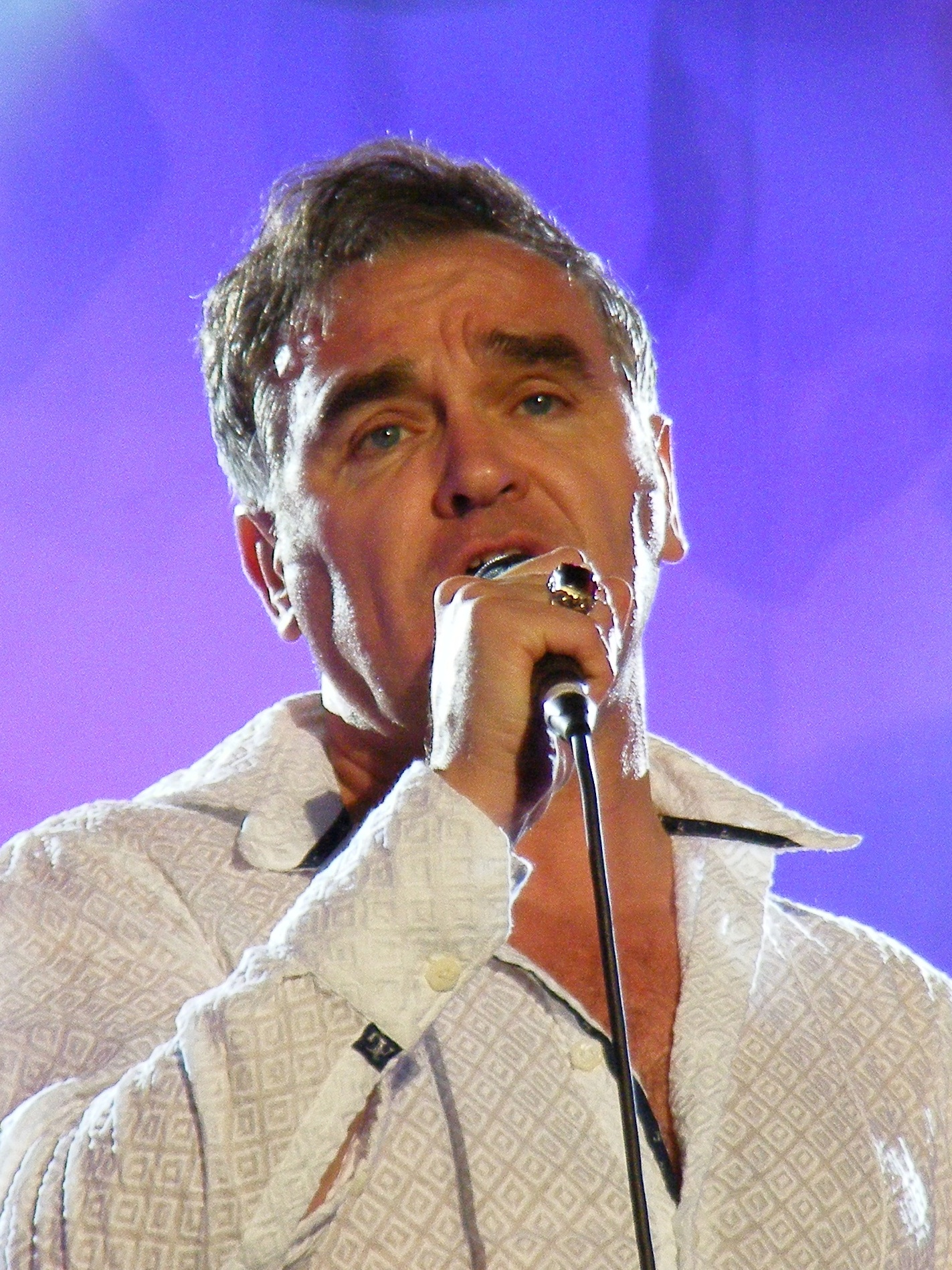
- Morrissey in 2011

Background information
- Born: Steven Patrick Morrissey; 22 May 1959 (age 67); Old Trafford, Lancashire, England
- Genres: Alternative rock; indie pop; indie rock; jangle pop
- Occupations: Singer; songwriter
- Years active: 1977–present
- Labels: His Master's Voice; EMI; Parlophone; Sire; RCA; Reprise; Mercury; Island; Attack; Sanctuary; Decca; Lost Highway; Major Minor; Liberty; Harvest; BMG; Capitol
- Formerly of: The Smiths
- Website: morrisseycentral.com

Steven Patrick Morrissey (/ˈmɒrɪsi/; born 22 May 1959), mononymously known as Morrissey, is an English singer and songwriter. He came to prominence as the frontman and lyricist of the rock band the Smiths, who were active from 1982 to 1987. Since then he has pursued a successful solo career. Morrissey's music is characterised by his baritone voice and distinctive lyrics with anti-establishment stances and recurring themes of emotional isolation, sexual longing, self-deprecation, and dark humour.

Morrissey was born to working-class Irish immigrants in Old Trafford, Lancashire, England; the family lived in Hulme but moved due to the 1960s demolitions of almost all the Victorian-era houses, known as "slum clearance", and he grew up in nearby Stretford. As a child, he developed a love of literature, kitchen sink realism and 1960s pop music. He began a career in music journalism and wrote several books on music and film in the early 1980s. He formed the Smiths with guitarist Johnny Marr in 1982 and the band soon attracted national recognition for their eponymous debut album. As the band's frontman, Morrissey attracted attention for his trademark quiff and witty and sardonic lyrics. Deliberately avoiding rock machismo, he cultivated the image of a sexually ambiguous social outsider who embraced celibacy. The Smiths released three further studio albums—Meat Is Murder (1985), The Queen Is Dead (1986) and Strangeways, Here We Come (1987)—and had a string of top 20 singles on the UK chart. The band were critically acclaimed and attracted a cult following. Personal differences between Morrissey and Marr resulted in the separation of the Smiths in 1987.

Morrissey launched his solo career with Viva Hate in 1988. This album and its follow-ups—Kill Uncle (1991), Your Arsenal (1992) and Vauxhall and I (1994)—all entered the top 10 on the UK Albums Chart and spawned multiple top 20 singles on the UK chart. He took on Alain Whyte and Boz Boorer as his main co-writers to replace Marr. During this time, his image began to shift into that of a more robust figure who toyed with patriotic imagery and working-class masculinity. In the mid-to-late 1990s, his albums Southpaw Grammar (1995) and Maladjusted (1997) also charted but were less well received. Relocating to Los Angeles, United States, he took a musical hiatus from 1998 to 2003 before releasing a successful comeback album, You Are the Quarry, in 2004. Ensuing years saw the release of the albums Ringleader of the Tormentors (2006), Years of Refusal (2009), World Peace Is None of Your Business (2014), Low in High School (2017), California Son (2019), I Am Not a Dog on a Chain (2020) and Make-Up Is a Lie (2026), as well as his autobiography (2013) and his debut novel, List of the Lost (2015).

Highly influential, Morrissey has been credited as a seminal figure in the emergence of indie pop, indie rock and Britpop. In a 2006 poll for the BBC's Culture Show Morrissey was voted the second-greatest living British cultural icon. His work has been the subject of academic study. He has been a controversial and polarising figure throughout his music career due to his forthright opinions and outspoken nature, endorsing vegetarianism and animal rights, and criticising royalty and prominent politicians. He has also supported far-right activism with regard to British heritage and freedom of speech, and defended a particular vision of English national identity while critiquing the effects of immigration on the UK.

== Early life ==
=== 1959–1976: Childhood ===
Morrissey's family home (second from left) in Queens Square, Hulme, which was demolished in the 1960s. His aunt lived beside them in the end property.

Steven Patrick Morrissey was born on 22 May 1959 in Old Trafford, Lancashire. His parents, Elizabeth (née Dwyer) and Peter Morrissey, were Irish Catholics who had emigrated to Manchester from Dublin with his only sibling, his elder sister, Jacqueline, a year before his birth. Morrissey claims he was named after American actor Steve Cochran, although he may instead have been named in honour of his father's brother, Patrick Steven Morrissey, who died in infancy. His earliest home was a council house at 17 Harper Street in the Queen's Square area of Hulme, inner Manchester, since demolished. Living in that area as a child, he was deeply affected by the Moors murders, in which a number of local children were killed; the crimes had a lasting impression on him and would inspire the lyrics of the Smiths song "Suffer Little Children". He also became aware of the anti-Irish sentiment in British society against Irish immigrants to Britain, and would often use his heritage in some of his songs with the Smiths. In 1970, after the "slum clearances" of Victorian-era houses in Hulme, the family moved to another council house at 384 King's Road in Stretford.

==== Education ====
Following a primary education at St Wilfred's Primary School, Morrissey failed his 11-plus exam and proceeded to St Mary's Secondary Modern School, an experience he found unpleasant. He excelled at athletics, though he was an unpopular loner at the school. He left school in 1975, having received no formal qualifications. He continued his education at Stretford Technical College, where he gained three O-Levels in English literature, sociology, and the General Paper.

In 1985, Morrissey gave a tour of Manchester for the Oxford Road Show and spoke fondly of St Wilfred's, including meeting his former teachers and going through a photo album. Later in the tour, he arrived at St Mary's and described it in highly negative terms, wryly closing with "Not to be recommended." He has been critical of his formal education, later stating, "The education I received was so basically evil and brutal. All I learnt was to have no self-esteem and to feel ashamed without knowing why." He has also discussed being subjected to corporal punishment as a pupil, which is the subject of the Smiths' 1985 song "The Headmaster Ritual". Education is a recurring theme in his lyrics, such as "The Teachers Are Afraid of the Pupils" from Southpaw Grammar (1995) and the Years of Refusal bonus track "Because of My Poor Education" (2009). The working title for his first solo album Viva Hate was Education in Reverse and it was initially released in Australia under that title, though this was later rectified.

==== Family life and influences ====
I lost myself in music at a very early age, and I remained there ... I did fall in love with the voices I heard, whether they were male or female. I loved those people. I really, really did love those people. For what it was worth, I gave them my life ... my youth. Beyond the perimeter of pop music there was a drop at the end of the world.

— Morrissey, 1991.

In 1975 Morrissey travelled to the United States to visit an aunt who lived in Staten Island. The relationship between his parents was strained, and they ultimately separated in December 1976, with his father moving out of the family home.

Morrissey's librarian mother encouraged her son's interest in reading. He took an interest in feminist literature, citing examples such as Marjorie Rosen, Molly Haskell and Susan Brownmiller in a 1983 interview with NME. He particularly liked the Irish author Oscar Wilde, whom he came to idolise and reference often in his songs. The young Morrissey was a fan of the television soap opera Coronation Street, which focused on working-class communities in Manchester; he sent proposed scripts and storylines to its production company, Granada Television, although all were rejected. He was also a fan of Shelagh Delaney's A Taste of Honey and its 1961 film adaptation, which was a drama focusing on working-class life in Salford. Many of his later songs directly quoted A Taste of Honey.

Of his youth, Morrissey has said, "Pop music was all I ever had, and it was completely entwined with the image of the pop star. I remember feeling the person singing was actually with me and understood me and my predicament." He later revealed that the first record he purchased was Marianne Faithfull's 1965 single "Come and Stay With Me". He became a glam rock fan in the 1970s, enjoying the work of English artists like T. Rex, David Bowie and Roxy Music. He was also a fan of American glam rock artists such as Sparks, Jobriath and the New York Dolls. He formed a British fan club for the latter, attracting members through small adverts in the back pages of music magazines. It was through the New York Dolls' interest in female pop singers from the 1960s that Morrissey too developed a fascination for such artists, including Sandie Shaw, Twinkle and Dusty Springfield.

=== 1977–1981: Early bands and published books ===
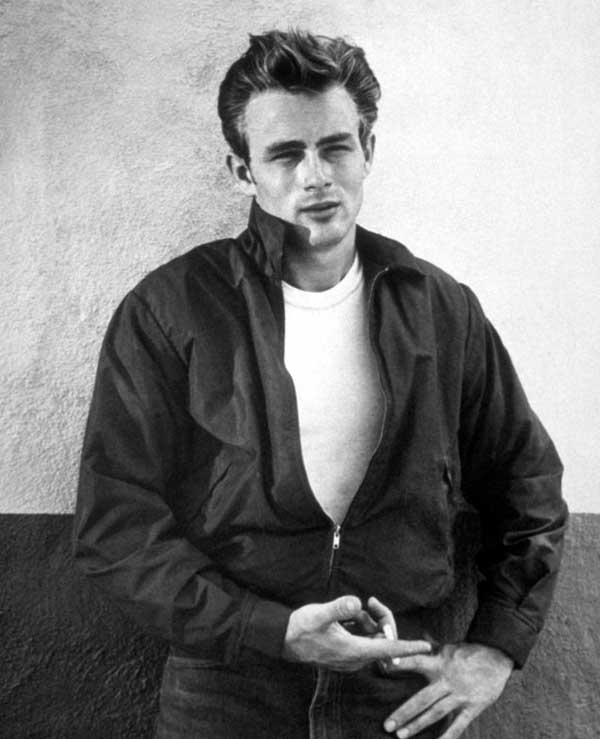
Morrissey idolised the American film actor James Dean and published a book about him.

Having left formal education, Morrissey proceeded through a series of jobs, as a clerk for the civil service and then the Inland Revenue, as a salesperson in a record store, and as a hospital porter, before abandoning employment and claiming unemployment benefits. He used much of the money from these jobs to purchase tickets for gigs, attending performances by Talking Heads, the Ramones and Blondie. He regularly attended concerts, having a particular interest in the alternative and post-punk music scene. Having met the guitarist Billy Duffy in November 1977, Morrissey agreed to become the vocalist for Duffy's punk band the Nosebleeds, although Morrissey later said, in 2024, that he "did not ever join" the band. Morrissey co-wrote a number of songs with the band—"Peppermint Heaven", "I Get Nervous" and "I Think I'm Ready for the Electric Chair"—and performed with them in support slots for Jilted John and then Magazine. The group soon disbanded.

Morrissey came to be known as a minor figure within Manchester's punk community. By 1981 he had become a close friend of Linder Sterling, the frontwoman of the punk jazz ensemble Ludus; her lyrics and style of singing both influenced him. Through Sterling he came to know Howard Devoto and Richard Boon. At the time Morrissey's best male friend was James Maker; he would visit Maker in London or they would meet in Manchester, where they visited the city's gay bars and gay clubs, in one case having to escape from a gang of gay bashers.

Wanting to become a professional writer, Morrissey considered a career in music journalism. He frequently wrote letters to the music press and was eventually hired by the weekly music review publication Record Mirror. He wrote several short books for local publishing company Babylon Books: in 1981 it released a 24-page booklet he had written on the New York Dolls, which sold 3,000 copies. This was followed by James Dean is Not Dead, about the late American film star James Dean. Morrissey had developed a love of Dean and had covered his bedroom with pictures of the dead film star.

== The Smiths ==
=== 1982–1984: Establishing the Smiths ===
In August 1978 Morrissey was briefly introduced to the 14-year-old Johnny Marr by mutual acquaintances at a Patti Smith gig held at Manchester's Apollo Theatre. Several years later, in May 1982, Marr turned up on the doorstep of Morrissey's house, there to ask Morrissey if he was interested in co-founding a band. Marr had been impressed that Morrissey had authored a book on the New York Dolls, and was inspired to turn up on his doorstep following the example of Jerry Leiber, who had formed his working partnership with Mike Stoller after turning up at the latter's door. According to Morrissey: "We got on absolutely famously. We were very similar in drive." The next day, Morrissey phoned Marr to confirm that he would be interested in forming a band with him. Steve Pomfret, who was the band's first bassist, soon left the band, to be replaced by Dale Hibbert. Around the time of the band's formation, Morrissey decided that he would be publicly known only by his surname, with Marr referring to him as "Mozzer" or "Moz". In 1983 he forbade those around him from using the name "Steven", which he despised. Morrissey was also responsible for choosing the band name of "the Smiths", later informing an interviewer that "it was the most ordinary name and I thought it was time that the ordinary folk of the world showed their faces".

Alongside developing their own songs, they also developed a cover of the Cookies' "I Want a Boy for My Birthday", the latter reflecting their deliberate desire to transgress established norms of gender and sexuality in rock in a manner inspired by the New York Dolls. In August 1982 they recorded their first demo at Manchester's Decibel Studios, and Morrissey took the demo recording to Factory Records, but they were not interested. In late summer 1982 Mike Joyce was joined as the drummer. In October 1982 they gave their first public performance, as a support act for Blue Rondo à la Turk at Manchester's The Ritz. Hibbert however was unhappy with what he perceived as the band's gay aesthetic; in turn, Morrissey and Marr were unhappy with his bass playing, and so he was removed from the band and replaced by Marr's old school friend Andy Rourke.

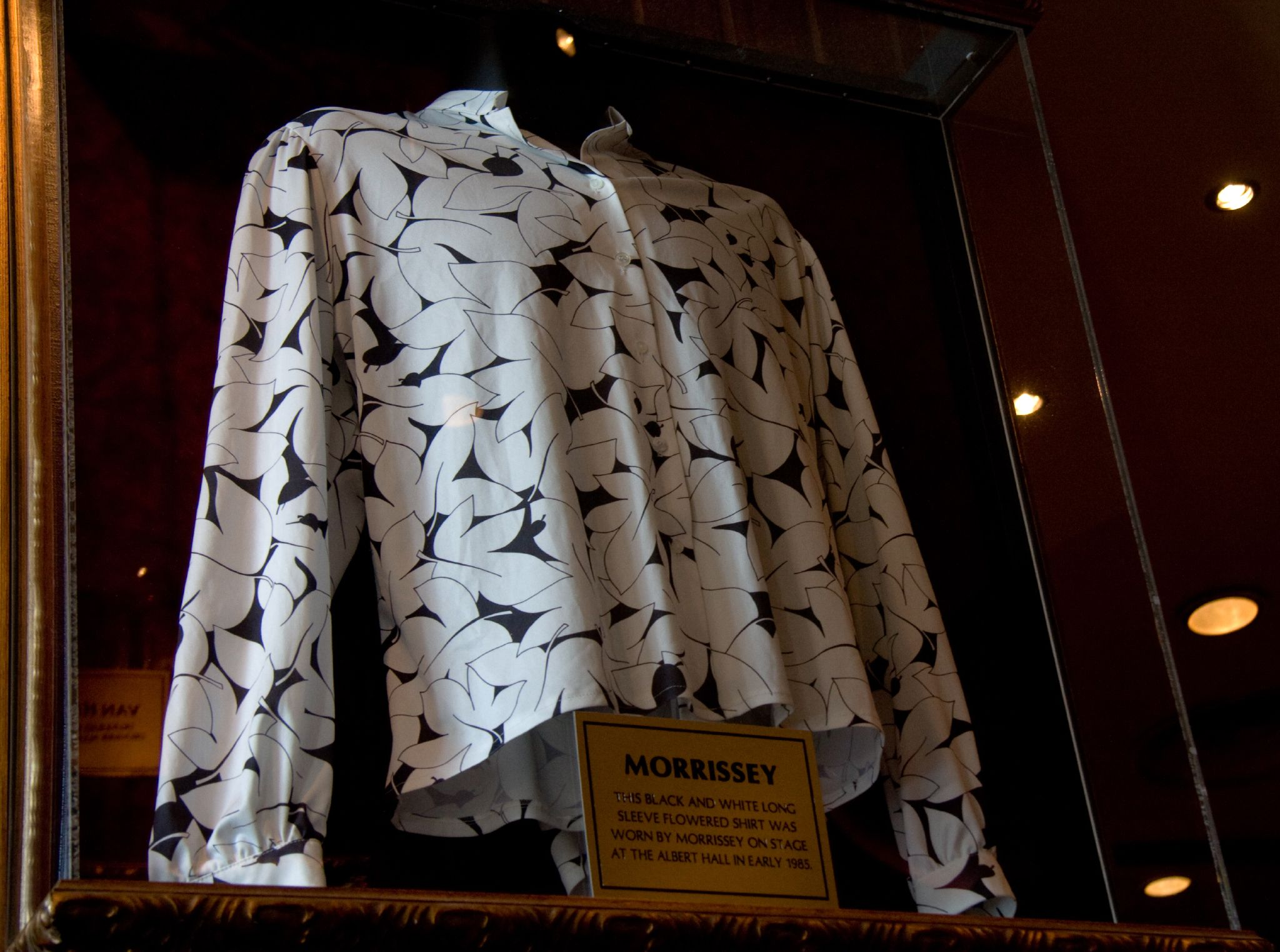
A typical shirt worn on stage by Morrissey in the 1980s, on display at the Barcelona Hard Rock Café

After the record company EMI turned them down, Morrissey and Marr visited London to hand a cassette of their recordings to Geoff Travis of the independent record label Rough Trade Records. Although not signing them to a contract immediately, he agreed to cut their song "Hand in Glove" as a single. Morrissey chose a homoerotic cover design in the form of a Jim French photograph. It was released in May 1983. The band soon generated controversy when Garry Bushell of tabloid newspaper The Sun alleged that their B-side "Handsome Devil" was an endorsement of paedophilia. The band denied this, with Morrissey stating that the song "has nothing to do with children, and certainly nothing to do with child molesting". In the wake of their single, the band performed their first significant London gig, gained radio airplay with a John Peel session, and obtained their first interviews in the music magazines NME and Sounds.

The follow-up singles "This Charming Man" and "What Difference Does It Make?" fared better when they reached numbers 25 and 12 respectively on the UK Singles Chart. Aided by praise from the music press and a series of studio sessions for Peel and David Jensen at BBC Radio 1, the Smiths began to acquire a dedicated fan base. In February 1984 they released their debut album, The Smiths, which reached number 2 on the UK Albums Chart.

As frontman of the Smiths, Morrissey—described as "lanky, soft-spoken, bequiffed and bespectacled"—subverted many of the norms that were associated with pop and rock music. The band's aesthetic simplicity was a reaction to the excess personified by the New Romantics, and while Morrissey adopted an androgynous appearance like the New Romantics or earlier glam rockers, his was far more subtle and understated. According to one commentator, "he was bookish; he wore NHS spectacles and a hearing aid on stage; he was celibate. Worst of all, he was sincere", with his music being "so intoxicatingly melancholic, so dangerously thoughtful, so seductively funny that it lured its listeners ... into a relationship with him and his music instead of the world." In an academic paper on the band, Julian Stringer characterised the Smiths as "one of Britain's most overtly political groups", while in his study of their work, Andrew Warns termed them "this most anti-capitalist of bands". Morrissey had been particularly vocal in his criticism of Prime Minister Margaret Thatcher; after the October 1984 Brighton hotel bombing, he commented that "the only sorrow" of it was "that Thatcher escaped unscathed". In 1988 he stated that Section 28 "embodies Thatcher's very nature and her quite natural hatred".

=== 1984–1987: The Smiths' growing success ===
The Smiths brought realism to their romance, and tempered their angst with the lightest of touches. The times were personified in their frontman: rejecting all taints of rock n' roll machismo, he played up the social awkwardness of the misfit and the outsider, his gently haunting vocals whooping suddenly upward into a falsetto, clothed in outsize women's shirts, sporting National Health specs or a huge Johnny Ray-style hearing aid. This charming young man was, in the vernacular of the time, the very antithesis of a "rockist"—always knowingly closer to the gentle ironicist Alan Bennett, or self-lacerating diarist Kenneth Williams, than a licentious Mick Jagger or drugged-out Jim Morrison.

— Paul A. Woods, 2007.

In 1984 the band released two non-album singles: "Heaven Knows I'm Miserable Now" (their first UK top-ten hit) and "William, It Was Really Nothing". The year ended with the compilation album Hatful of Hollow. This collected singles, B-sides and the versions of songs that had been recorded throughout the previous year for the Peel and Jensen shows. Early in 1985, the band released their second album, Meat Is Murder, which was their only studio album to top the UK charts. The single-only release "Shakespeare's Sister" reached number 26 on the UK Singles Chart, though the only single taken from the album, "That Joke Isn't Funny Anymore", was less successful, barely making the top 50. "How Soon Is Now?" was originally a B-side of "William, It Was Really Nothing", and was subsequently featured on Hatful of Hollow and the American, Canadian, Australian and Warner UK editions of Meat Is Murder. Belatedly released as a single in the UK in 1985, "How Soon Is Now?" reached number 24 on the UK Singles Chart.

During 1985 the band undertook lengthy tours of the UK and the US while recording the next studio record, The Queen Is Dead. The album was released in June 1986, shortly after the single "Bigmouth Strikes Again". The record reached number 2 in the UK charts. All was not well within the band. A legal dispute with Rough Trade had delayed the album by almost seven months (it had been completed in November 1985), and Marr was beginning to feel the stress of the band's exhausting touring and recording schedule. Meanwhile, Rourke was fired in early 1986 for his use of heroin. Rourke was temporarily replaced on bass guitar by Craig Gannon, but he was reinstated after only a fortnight. Gannon stayed in the band, switching to rhythm guitar. This five-piece recorded the singles "Panic" and "Ask" (with Kirsty MacColl on backing vocals) which reached numbers 11 and 14 respectively on the UK Singles Chart, and toured the UK. After the tour ended in October 1986, Gannon left the band. The band had become frustrated with Rough Trade and sought a record deal with a major label, ultimately signing with EMI, which drew criticism from some of the band's fanbase.

In early 1987 the single "Shoplifters of the World Unite" was released and reached number 12 on the UK Singles Chart. It was followed by a second compilation album, The World Won't Listen, which reached number 2 in the charts—and the single "Sheila Take a Bow", the band's second (and last during the band's lifetime) UK top-10 hit. Despite their continued success, personal differences within the band—including the increasingly strained relationship between Morrissey and Marr—saw them on the verge of breaking up. In July 1987, Marr left the band and auditions to find a replacement proved fruitless.

By the time that the band's fourth album, Strangeways, Here We Come, was released in September, the band had broken up. Morrissey attributed the band's break-up to the lack of a managerial figure—in a 1989 interview with then-teenage fan Tim Samuels. Strangeways peaked at number 2 in the UK, but was only a minor US hit, though it was more successful there than the band's previous albums.

== Solo career ==
=== 1988–1991: Early solo work ===
Several months before the Smiths dissolved, Morrissey enlisted Stephen Street as his personal producer and new songwriting partner, with whom he could begin his solo career. By September 1987 he had begun work on his first solo album, Viva Hate, at The Wool Hall studio near Bath; it was recorded with the musicians Vini Reilly and Andrew Paresi. Rather than featuring pre-existing images of celebrities, as the Smiths' album and single covers had done, the cover sleeve of Viva Hate featured a photograph of Morrissey taken by Anton Corbijn. In February 1988, EMI released the first single from this album, "Suedehead", which reached number 5 on the British singles chart, a higher position than any Smiths single had achieved. The second single from the album, "Everyday Is Like Sunday", was released in June and reached number 9. The album reached number 1 on the UK album charts. The album's final song, "Margaret on the Guillotine", featured descriptions of Thatcher being executed; in response, the Conservative member of Parliament Geoffrey Dickens accused Morrissey of being involved in a terrorist network and police Special Branch conducted a search of his Manchester home.

Morrissey's first solo performance took place at Wolverhampton Civic Hall in December 1988. The event attracted huge crowds, and the NME journalist James Brown observed that "the excitement and atmosphere inside the hall was like nothing I have ever experienced at any public event". Following Viva Hate, Morrissey put out two new singles; "The Last of the Famous International Playboys" was about the Kray twins, gangsters who operated in the East End of London, and reached number 6 on the UK singles chart. This was followed by "Interesting Drug", which reached number 9. After his songwriting partnership with Street ended and was replaced by Alan Winstanley and Clive Langer, he recorded "Ouija Board, Ouija Board", released as a single in November 1989; it reached number 18. Christian spokespeople and tabloid newspapers condemned the song, claiming that it promoted occultism, to which Morrissey responded that "the only contact I ever made with the dead was when I spoke to a journalist from The Sun."

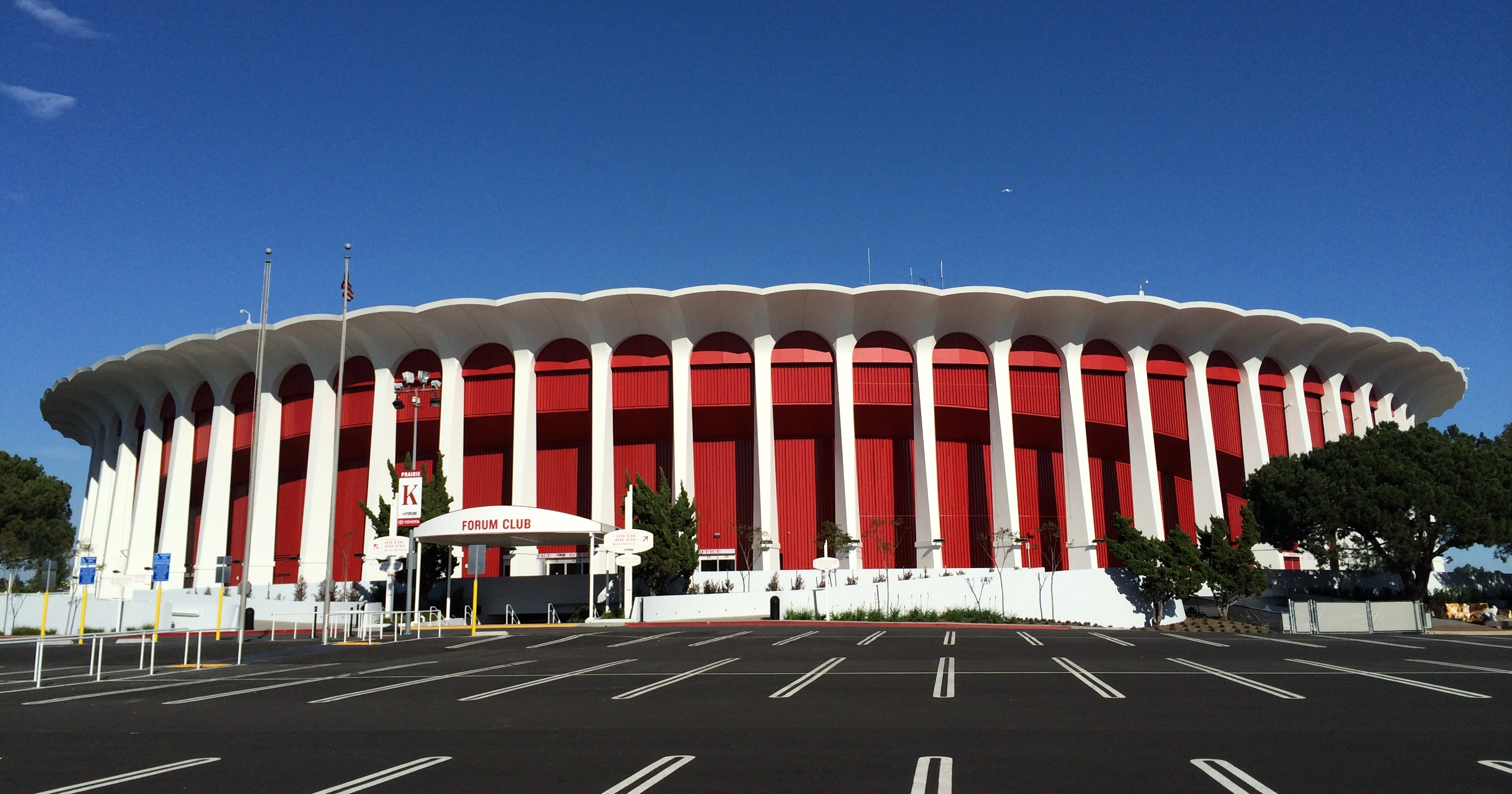
In the 1990s, Morrissey sold out The Forum in Los Angeles in fifteen minutes.

With Winstanley and Langer he began work on his first compilation album, Bona Drag, although only recorded six new songs for it, the rest of the album comprising his recent singles and B-sides. The album reached number 9 on the UK album chart. Two of the newly recorded Bona Drag tracks were released as singles: "November Spawned a Monster", a song about a woman who is a wheelchair user, reached number 12 in the charts but received criticism from some who believed that it mocked disabled people. The second, "Piccadilly Palare", referenced London rent boys and featured terms from the polari gay slang. Released in November 1990, it reached number 19 in the charts. The song attracted some criticism from the British gay press, who were of the opinion that it was wrong for Morrissey to use polari when he was not openly gay; in an interview the previous year he had nevertheless acknowledged his attraction to both men and women.

Adopting Mark E. Nevin as his new songwriting partner, Morrissey created his second solo album, Kill Uncle; released in March 1991, it peaked at number 8 on the album chart. The two singles released in promotion of the album, "Our Frank" and "Sing Your Life", failed to break the Top 20 on the singles charts, reaching number 26 and 33 respectively. Another of the album's tracks, "Found, Found, Found", alluded to Morrissey's friendship with Michael Stipe, the lead singer of American indie rock band R.E.M. Planning his first solo tour, Morrissey assembled several musicians with a background in rockabilly for his new backing group, including the guitarist Boz Boorer, Alain Whyte and Spencer Cobrin. Morrissey began the Kill Uncle tour in Europe; he brought Phranc as his support act and decorated the stage of each performance with a large image of Edith Sitwell. On the US leg of his tour, he sold out Los Angeles' 18,000 seat The Forum in fifteen minutes, faster than Michael Jackson or Madonna had done. During the performance, David Bowie joined him onstage for a rendition of T. Rex's "Cosmic Dancer". In the US he sold out 25 of his 26 other performances; one appearance in Texas was filmed by Tim Broad for release as the VHS Live in Dallas. He proceeded to Japan—where he was frustrated by the authorities' tough stance toward fans—and then Australasia, where he cancelled several dates due to acute sinusitis.

The early 1990s were described by the biographer David Bret as the "black phase" in Morrissey's relationship with the British music press, which was increasingly hostile and critical of him. In some cases, this involved the press spreading misinformation, such as the claim that he and Phranc were recording a cover of "Don't Go Breaking My Heart"; others, such as those of Barbara Ellen in NME, were closer to personal attack than musical review. NME claimed that his cancelled performances reflected a disrespect towards his fans. He became increasingly reticent in talking to British music journalists, expressing frustration at how they constantly compared his solo work with that of the Smiths; "my past is almost denying me a future". He told one interviewer that the band he was then working with were technically better musicians than the Smiths had ever been.

=== 1992–1995: Changing image ===
In July 1992 Morrissey released the album Your Arsenal, which peaked at number 2 in the album chart. It was the final release from producer Mick Ronson; Morrissey related that working with Ronson had been "the greatest privilege of my life". Your Arsenal reflected Morrissey's lament for what he regarded as the decline of British culture in the face of increasing Americanisation. He told one interviewer that "everything is informed by American culture—everyone under fifty speaks American—and that's sad. We once had a strong identity and now that's gone completely". A number of the tracks on the album, most notably "Certain People I Know" and "The National Front Disco", dealt with the lives and experiences of tough, working-class youths. Your Arsenal was critically well received, and often described as his best album since Viva Hate. The first single, "We Hate It When Our Friends Become Successful", had been released in April 1992 and peaked at number 17; this was followed by "You're the One for Me, Fatty", which reached number 19 and "Certain People I Know", which reached number 34. From September to December, Morrissey embarked on a 53-date Your Arsenal tour in which he varyingly decorated the stage with backdrops of skinhead girls, Diana Dors, Elvis Presley and Charlie Richardson. One of the performances was recorded and released as Beethoven Was Deaf (1993).

By the release of Your Arsenal, Morrissey's image had changed; according to Simpson, the singer had converted "from the aesthete interested in rough lads into a rough lad interested in aestheticism (and rough lads)". According to Woods, Morrissey developed an air of "quietly assured masculinity", representing "a more robust, burlier, beefier version of himself", while the poet and Morrissey fan Simon Armitage described the transition as being one from that of "stick-thin, knock-me-over-with-a-feather campness" to that of a "mobster and bare-knuckle boxer image". This new image was reflected in the cover art for Your Arsenal; a photograph taken by Sterling, it featured Morrissey onstage with his shirt open, displaying a muscular torso beneath.

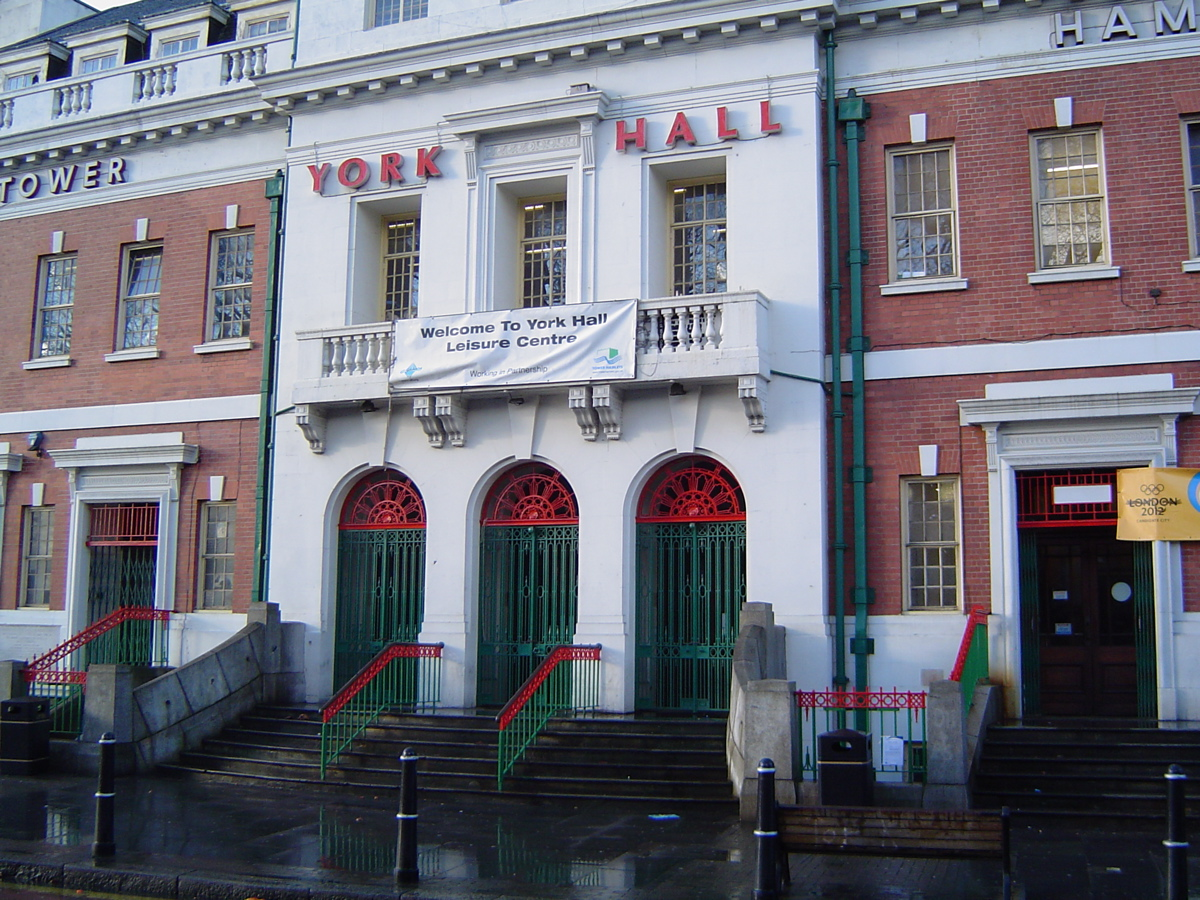
The York Hall boxing venue which Morrissey frequented in the mid-1990s

In mid-1993 Morrissey co-wrote his fifth album, Vauxhall and I, with Whyte and Boorer; it was produced by Steve Lillywhite. Morrissey described the album as "the best I've ever made", and at the time believed it would be either his final or penultimate work. It was both a critical and commercial success, topping the UK album chart in March 1994. The album had been named after Vauxhall, a district of South West London famous for the Royal Vauxhall Tavern gay pub. One of the album's songs, "The More You Ignore Me, the Closer I Get", was released as a single at the time and reached number 8 in the UK. The single's sleeve featured images of Jake Walters, a skinhead in his twenties, who was living with Morrissey at the time. Walters had introduced Morrissey to York Hall, a boxing venue in Bethnal Green, part of London's East End, and Morrissey spent an increasing amount of time there.

That year, he also released a non-album single, "Interlude", a duet with Siouxsie Sioux: the track was a cover of a Timi Yuro song. The record was published under the banner "Morrissey & Siouxsie"; due to record company issues, "Interlude" was only available on import outside Europe.

In the autumn of 1994 Morrissey recorded five songs at the Olympic Studios in South London. In January 1995 the single "Boxers" was released, reaching number 23 on the singles chart. In February 1995 he embarked on the Boxers tour, supported by the band Marion and featuring a backdrop depiction of the boxer Cornelius Carr. One of these performances was filmed by James O'Brien and released as the VHS Introducing Morrissey. In December 1995 the song "Sunny" was released as a single; a lament for Morrissey's terminated relationship with Walters, the song was the first of Morrissey's singles not to chart. In 1995 the compilation album World of Morrissey was released, containing largely B-sides.

=== 1995–2003: Move to Los Angeles ===
After his contract with EMI expired, Morrissey signed to RCA. On this label he recorded his next album, Southpaw Grammar, at the Miraval Studios in southern France before releasing it in August 1995. Its cover art featured an image of the boxer Kenny Lane. It reached number 4 in the UK album charts, but made little impact compared to its two predecessors. In September 1995, Morrissey served as the support act for the British leg of Bowie's Outside Tour. Backstage at the Aberdeen gig, Morrissey was taken ill and taken to hospital; he did not return for the rest of the tour. Later referring to the tour critically, he said that when you become involved with Bowie, "you have to worship at the Temple of David".

In December 1996 a legal case against Morrissey and Marr brought by Smiths' drummer Mike Joyce arrived at the High Court. Joyce alleged that he had not received his fair share of recording and performance royalties from his time with the band, calling for at least £1 million in damages and 25% of all future Smiths album sales. After a seven-day hearing, the judge ruled in favour of Joyce. In summing up the case, Judge Justice Weeks referred to Morrissey as "devious, truculent and unreliable when his own interests were at stake", with the words "devious" and "truculent" being widely used in press coverage of the ruling. Marr paid the money legally owed to Joyce but Morrissey launched an appeal against the ruling. He said that the judge had been biased against him from the start of the proceedings because of his public criticisms of Thatcher and her government. Morrissey lost his appeal in July 1998, although he launched another soon after; this too was unsuccessful. In a November 2005 statement, Morrissey said that Joyce had cost him £600,000 in legal fees alone and approximately £1,515,000 in total.

Morrissey returned on Island Records in 1997, releasing the single "Alma Matters" in July, followed by his next album Maladjusted in August. The album peaked at number 8 in the UK album charts. Its further two singles, "Roy's Keen" and "Satan Rejected My Soul", both peaked outside the top 30 on the UK singles chart. Having been unhappy with the cover design for Southpaw Grammar, Morrissey left control of cover art of Maladjusted to his record company, but again was unsatisfied with the result.

Uncut reported in 1998 that Morrissey no longer had a record deal. The following year, he embarked on the Oye Esteban Tour, and was one of the headliners of the Coachella Festival in California.

The England that I have loved, and I have sung about, and whose death I have sung about, I felt had finally slipped away. And so I was no longer saying, "England is dying." I was beginning to say, "Well, yes, it has died and here's the carcass"—so why hang around?

— Morrissey, on his move to Los Angeles.

Leaving Britain, Morrissey purchased a house in Lincoln Heights, Los Angeles. It had formerly been the residence of Carole Lombard and had been re-designed by William Haines. Over the next few years he rarely returned to Britain. In 2002 Morrissey returned with a world tour, culminating in two sold-out nights at the Royal Albert Hall, during which he played as-yet unreleased songs. Outside the US and Europe, concerts also took place in Australia and Japan. During this time, Channel 4 filmed The Importance of Being Morrissey, a documentary which aired in 2003; it was Morrissey's first major screen interview to appear on British television. He told interviewers that he was working on an autobiography, and expressed criticism of reality television music shows like Pop Idol which were then in their infancy.

=== 2004–2009: Comeback ===
In 2003 Morrissey signed to Sanctuary Records, where he was given the defunct reggae label Attack Records to use for his next project. Produced by Jerry Finn and recorded in Los Angeles and Berkshire, Morrissey's seventh solo album, You Are the Quarry, was released in May 2004. The album's cover art featured an image of Morrissey carrying a Tommy gun. It peaked at number 2 on the UK album chart and number 11 on the US Billboard album chart. The first single, "Irish Blood, English Heart", reached number 3 in the UK singles chart, the highest ranked single of his career. He promoted the album on both Top of the Pops and Later with Jools Holland, and gave his first television interview in 17 years on Friday Night with Jonathan Ross; Morrissey was visibly uncomfortable with Jonathan Ross' questions. He also agreed to interviews with various press outlets, including the NME, stating that "the nasty old guard" who controlled the magazine in the 1990s were gone and that it was not "the smelly NME any more".

To promote the album, Morrissey embarked on a world tour from April to November. He marked his 45th birthday with a concert at the Manchester Arena, supported by Franz Ferdinand; it was recorded for release as the DVD Who Put the M in Manchester? Morrissey was also invited to curate that year's Meltdown festival at London's Southbank Centre. Among the acts he secured were Sparks, Loudon Wainwright III, Ennio Marchetto, Nancy Sinatra, the Cockney Rejects, Lypsinka, the Ordinary Boys, the Libertines and the playwright Alan Bennett. He unsuccessfully attempted to secure appearances from Brigitte Bardot and Maya Angelou. That year he also performed at several UK music festivals, including Leeds, Reading and Glastonbury.

Morrissey's eighth studio album, Ringleader of the Tormentors, was recorded in Rome and released in April 2006. It debuted at number 1 in the UK album charts and number 27 in the US. The album yielded four singles: "You Have Killed Me", "The Youngest Was the Most Loved", "In the Future When All's Well", and "I Just Want to See the Boy Happy". The album was produced by Tony Visconti; Morrissey called the album "the most beautiful—perhaps the most gentle—so far". Billboard described the album as showcasing "a thicker, more rock-driven sound".

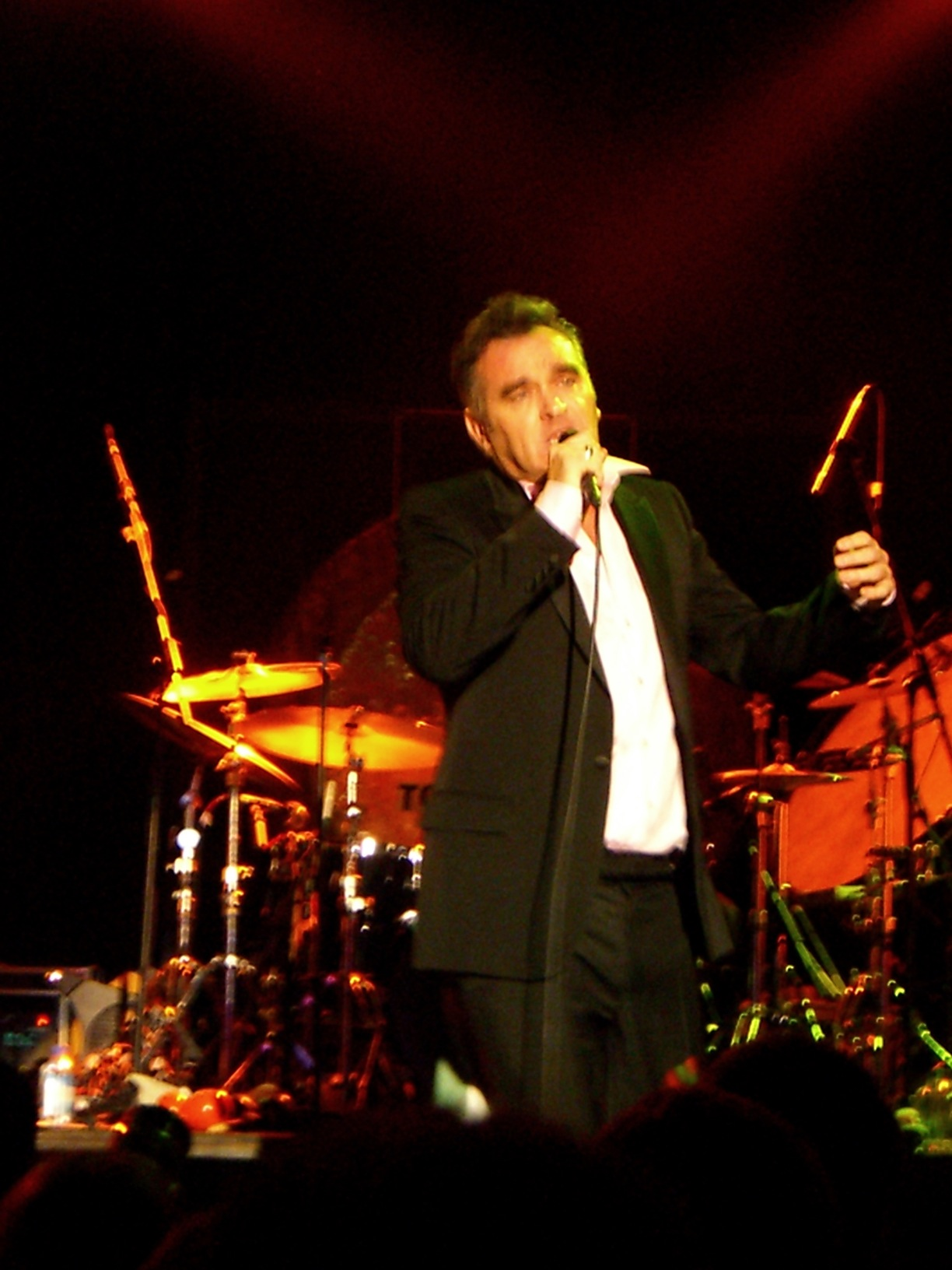
Morrissey at SXSW in 2006

In December 2007 Morrissey signed a new deal with Decca Records, which included a Greatest Hits album and a new studio album. Greatest Hits charted at number 5 in the UK album chart. "That's How People Grow Up" was the first single from Greatest Hits, reaching number 14 in the UK charts. A second single from the album, "All You Need Is Me", followed.

His ninth studio album, Years of Refusal, originally due in September, was postponed until February 2009, as a result of the death of producer Jerry Finn, and the lack of an American label to distribute the album. When released by the Universal Music Group, it reached number 3 in the UK Albums Chart and 11 in the US Billboard 200. The record was widely acclaimed by critics, with comparisons made to Your Arsenal and Vauxhall and I. A review from Pitchfork Media noted that with Years of Refusal, Morrissey "has rediscovered himself, finding new potency in his familiar arsenal. Morrissey's rejuvenation is most obvious in the renewed strength of his vocals" and called it his "most venomous, score-settling album, and in a perverse way that makes it his most engaging". "I'm Throwing My Arms Around Paris" and "Something Is Squeezing My Skull" were released as the record's singles. The song "Black Cloud" features the guitar-playing of Jeff Beck. Throughout 2009, Morrissey toured to promote the album. As part of the extensive Tour of Refusal, Morrissey followed a lengthy US tour with concerts booked in Ireland, the UK and Russia.

In October 2009 Swords, a B-sides collection of material released between 2004 and 2009, was released. It peaked at 55 on the UK albums chart, and Morrissey later called it "a meek disaster". On the second date of the UK tour to promote Swords, Morrissey collapsed onstage in Swindon, and was briefly hospitalised. Following the Swords tour, Morrissey had fulfilled his contractual obligation to Universal Records and was without a record company.

=== 2010–2019: Further studio albums and literary work ===
In April 2011 EMI issued a new compilation, Very Best of Morrissey, for which the singer chose the track list and artwork. In March 2011, Morrissey took Ron Laffitte as his manager. In June and July 2011, Morrissey played a UK tour; during his 2011 performance at Glastonbury Festival, Morrissey criticised UK Prime Minister David Cameron for attempting to prevent a ban on wild animals performing in circuses, calling him a "silly twit". This was followed by several dates elsewhere in Europe. Morrissey's 2012 tour started in South America and continued through Asia and North America. Morrissey played concerts in Belgium, Italy, Greece, Turkey, Israel, Portugal, England and Scotland. In July 2012, during a concert visit to Israel, Morrissey was awarded a symbolic key to the city of Tel Aviv by the city's mayor, Ron Huldai. He later described himself as "a small face of Tel Aviv" and said he would be happy to represent the city "with integrity and loyalty". Morrissey has performed in Israel on multiple occasions. Between January and March 2013, Morrissey toured 32 North American cities, beginning in Greenvale, New York, and ending in Portland, Oregon.

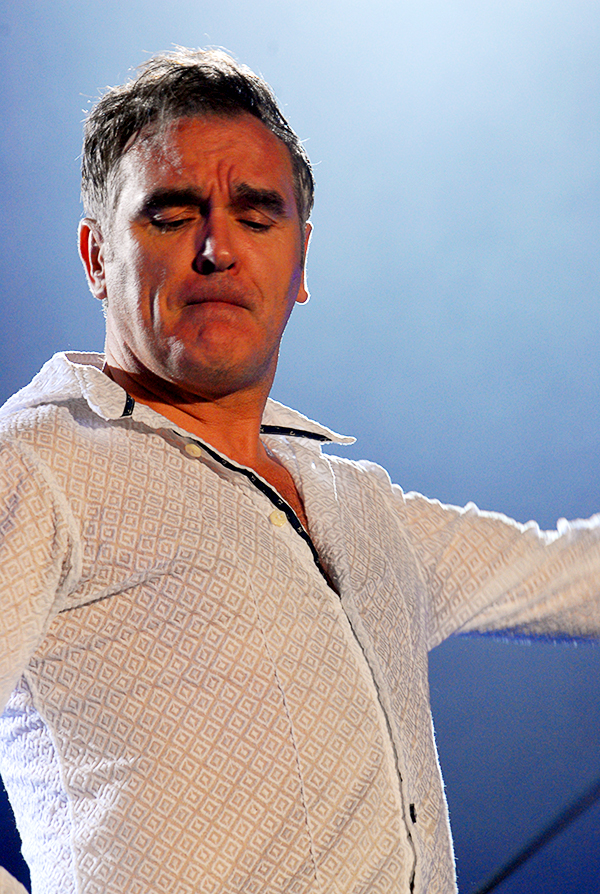
Morrissey in 2011

In January 2013 Morrissey was diagnosed with a bleeding ulcer and several engagements were rescheduled. On 7 March he was hospitalised again, this time with pneumonia in both lungs. One week later, the rest of the tour was cancelled. During his rehabilitation he spent time in Ireland, where he watched the country's football team play a match against Austria in the company of his cousin Robbie Keane.

In April, EMI reissued the single "The Last of the Famous International Playboys", backed by three new songs: "People Are the Same Everywhere", "Action Is My Middle Name", and "The Kid's a Looker", all recorded live in 2011. Starting in June, Morrissey performed in Mexico, Brazil, Argentina, Peru and Chile. Morrissey's concert at Hollywood High School on 2 March 2013 had a theatrical release in August, titled Morrissey: 25 Live; it marks his 25th year as a solo artist and was the first authorised live Morrissey DVD in nine years. In July, Morrissey cancelled the South American leg of his tour due to a "lack of funding", saying it was "the last of many final straws".

In October 2013, Morrissey's autobiography, titled Autobiography, was released after a "content dispute" had delayed it from the initial release date of 16 September 2013. The book's release caused controversy as it was published as a "contemporary classic" under the Penguin Classics label at Morrissey's request, which some critics felt devalued the Penguin Classics label. Morrissey had completed the 660-page book in 2011, before shopping it to publishers such as Penguin Books and Faber and Faber. The book received divergent reviews: The Daily Telegraph giving it a five-star review that described it as "the best written musical autobiography since Bob Dylan's Chronicles", while The Independent criticised the book's "droning narcissism" as well as its status as a Penguin Classic. The book entered the UK book charts at number 1, nearly 35,000 copies being sold in its first week. In December, a 2011 live cover version of Lou Reed's "Satellite of Love", was released as a single.

In January 2014 Morrissey signed a two-record deal with Capitol Music. His tenth studio album, World Peace Is None of Your Business, was released in July. Prior to its release, he embarked on a US tour in May, but was hospitalised in Boston in early June, cancelling the remaining nine tour dates. After finishing a six date tour in the UK, he did a US tour during June and July, including a concert in New York with special guest Blondie at Madison Square Garden. In July 2015 he publicly claimed that an airport security guard had groped him at San Francisco International Airport. He filed a sexual assault complaint; the Transportation Security Administration found no supporting evidence to act on the allegation. In August, Capitol Music and Harvest Records ended their contracts with Morrissey. In October he disclosed he had received treatment for Barrett's oesophageal cancer.

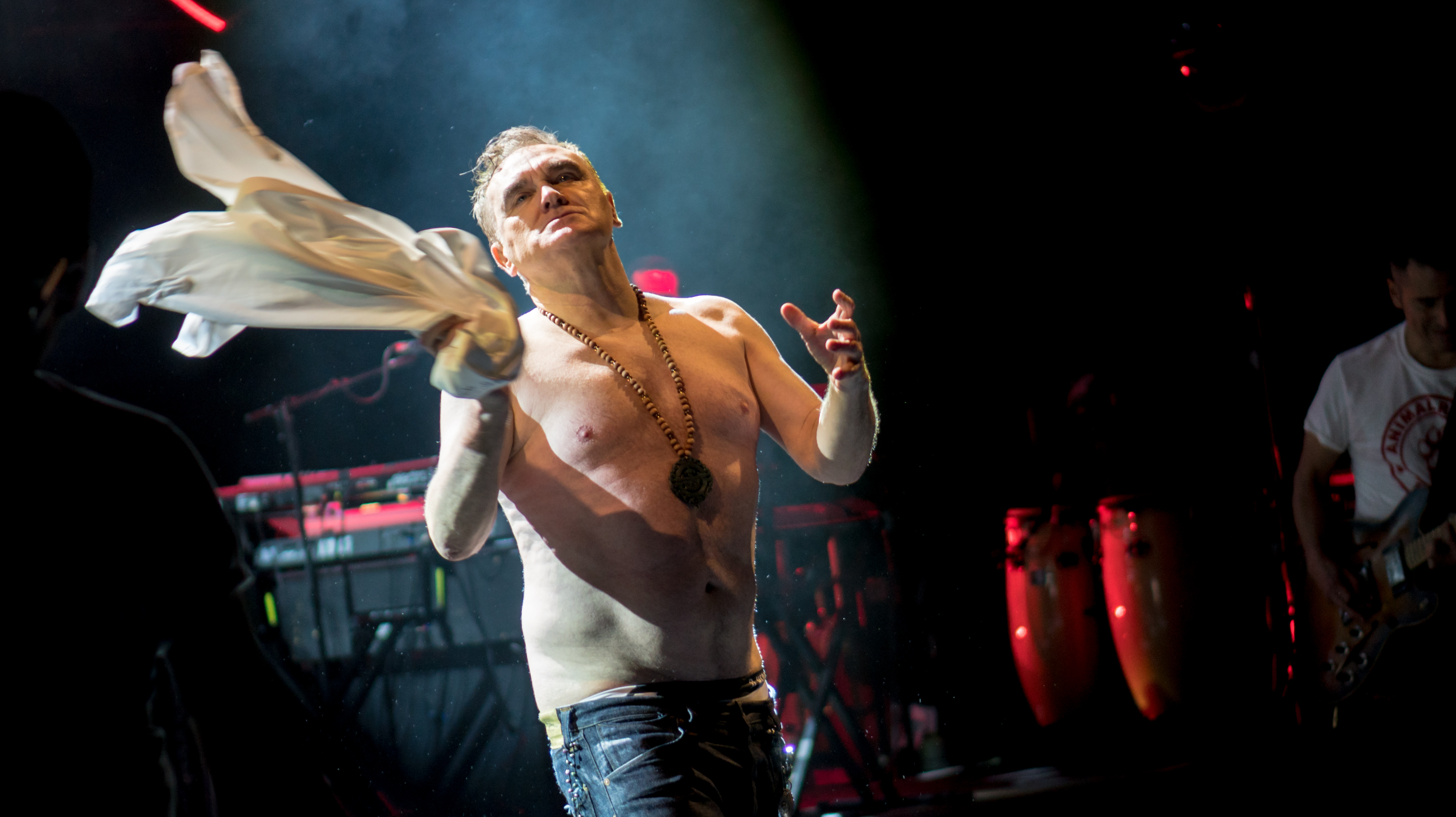
Morrissey in 2018

In September 2015 Penguin Books published Morrissey's first novel, List of the Lost.

In November 2017, his eleventh studio album, Low in High School, was released through BMG and Morrissey's own Etienne record label. That same month, Morrissey attracted press attention and criticism for comments made in an interview with Der Spiegel: he stated that it was "quite sad" that distinct national identities in Europe were being undermined by politicians trying "to introduce a multicultural aspect to everything", and that some individuals claiming victimhood as part of the Me Too movement were not genuine victims of sexual assault but were "simply disappointed". Morrissey accused Der Spiegel of misquoting him and said it would be his last print interview. He played two shows at Los Angeles' Hollywood Bowl in November. Morrissey's first UK tour since 2015 began in Aberdeen and concluded in London.

In November 2018 Morrissey released a cover of the Pretenders' "Back on the Chain Gang", performing it on The Late Late Show with James Corden. In May 2019 Morrissey played a seven-night residency at the Lunt-Fontanne Theatre on Broadway, prior to the release of his twelfth studio album, a covers album titled California Son.

=== 2020–present: I Am Not a Dog on a Chain, Bonfire of Teenagers and Make-Up Is a Lie ===
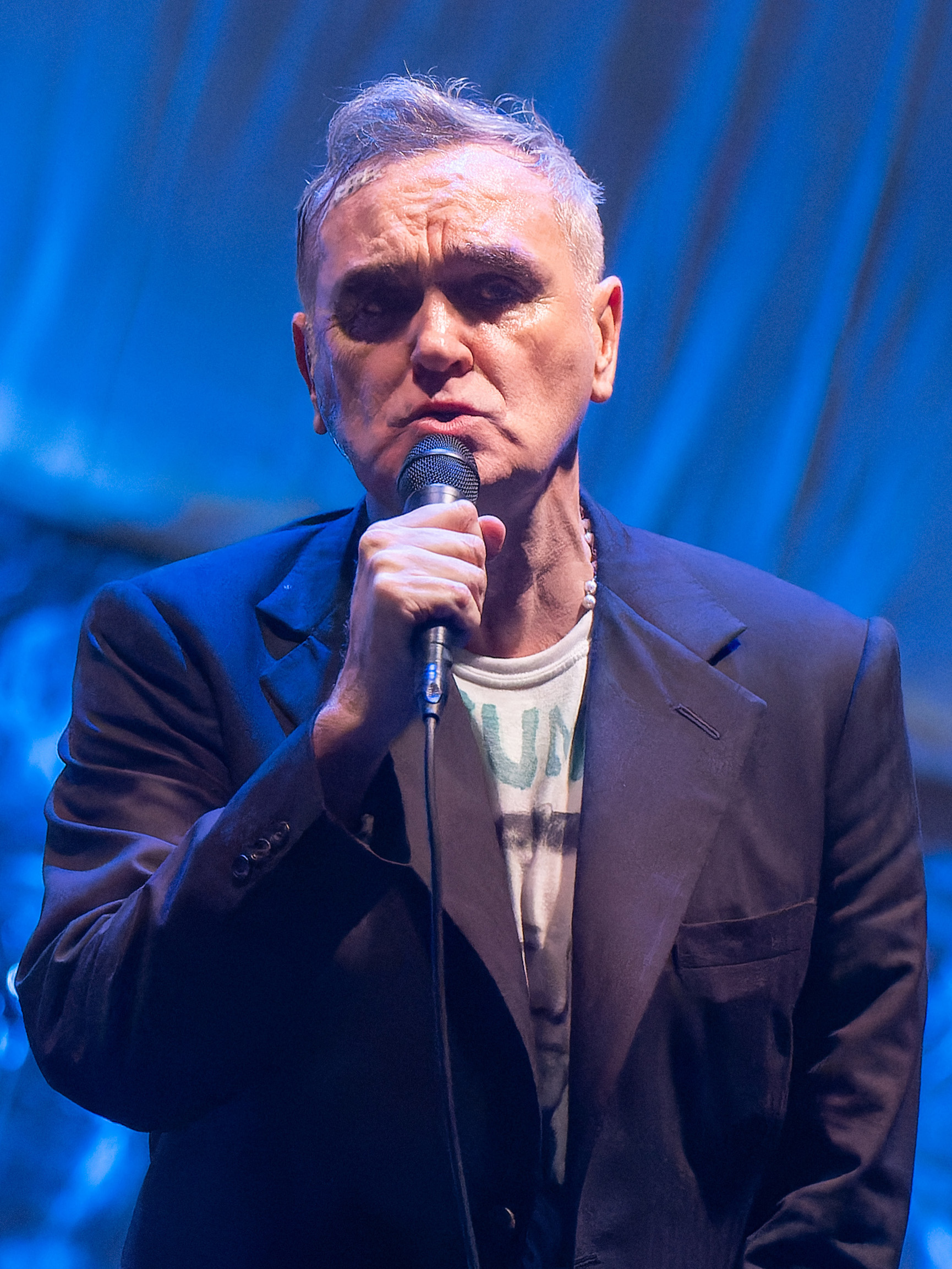
Morrissey in 2023

Morrissey released an 11-track album, I Am Not a Dog on a Chain, in March 2020. The lead single, "Bobby, Don't You Think They Know?" featuring Motown soul singer Thelma Houston, was also made available on streaming sites.

In November 2020 Morrissey's deal with BMG expired and was not renewed. Morrissey completed a Las Vegas residency in July 2022 titled "Viva Moz Vegas" for the second year in a row. He completed tour dates in the UK and Ireland.

The initial plan to release his fourteenth solo album Bonfire of Teenagers in 2023 on Capitol Records in the US, although he did not sign with a label for a UK release, was scrapped. The album has eleven songs produced by Andrew Watt and features the Red Hot Chili Peppers members Chad Smith and Flea alongside their former bandmate Josh Klinghoffer. Guests also included the singers Miley Cyrus and Iggy Pop, who contributed backing vocals. In addition, Capitol planned to re-issue several of Morrissey's albums released between 1995 and 2014, with the exception of Maladjusted. On 15 November it was announced that Bonfire of Teenagers was no longer scheduled to release in February, with Morrissey saying that the fate of the album was exclusively in the hands of the label.

On 25 November 2022 the album's lead single, "Rebels Without Applause", was released by Capitol Records worldwide. On 23 and 24 December Morrissey announced that he had voluntarily parted ways with his current management companies, Maverick and Quest, withdrew any association with Capitol Records, and revealed that Cyrus requested to have her vocals removed from the album, which still remains under the control of Capitol and would no longer be releasing it. He later confirmed in February 2023 that Capitol, while still maintaining control of the album, would not release Bonfire of Teenagers; he also suggested that the album had been "sabotaged" by Capitol. In April 2024, Morrissey announced that he had regained the rights to Bonfire of Teenagers and the 2014 album World Peace Is None of Your Business which was also distributed through Capitol. Despite subsequently shopping the album to other labels, Bonfire of Teenagers currently remains unreleased.

On 8 December 2022 Morrissey announced that in January and February 2023, he would record a new album, initially to be titled Without Music the World Dies. On 20 February 2023 he announced the album had been completed and unveiled its track-list, before offering the album to any record labels or private investors who would be willing to distribute it. The album was not picked up for distribution, and was subsequently partly re-recorded in France in late 2023, and given a new title. "We scrapped half of the tracks and we recorded six new ones, and so it is not the album from the beginning of 2023," Morrissey stated in an interview. Morrissey confirmed in a later interview with Teraz Rock, a Polish magazine, that the album has been renamed to You're Right, It's Time.

In 2024 "Interlude", Morrissey's duet with Siouxsie, was re-released on 12-inch gold vinyl for Record Store Day on 20 April 2024; it was available in the UK and other parts of Europe only.

In August 2024 Morrissey said in a post on his website that he and Marr had received a "lucrative offer" to tour as the Smiths in 2025. The singer said he accepted the invitation, but Marr did not respond. Marr did not publicly comment, but had then-recently posted a picture of Reform UK leader Nigel Farage to dismiss calls to reunite in the aftermath of Oasis's reunion. Marr previously said in 2016 that Morrissey's politics aligned with Farage's, joking that any potential Smiths reunion would feature Farage as their replacement guitarist.

Marr's statement also clarified other claims made by Morrissey's team on his website, including that Marr had filed for 100% ownership of the Smiths' intellectual property and trademark rights without having consulted with Morrissey, despite the fact that "Morrissey alone created the musical unit name 'the Smiths' in May 1982". In Marr's statement it was clarified that Marr discovered that the band did not own the trademark, and in an effort to protect the trademark from a third party attempt made in 2018 to use the band's name, Marr registered the trademark solely under his name after a failure to receive a response from Morrissey and his representatives. In January 2024 Marr signed an agreement to share ownership of the name with Morrissey, an agreement Morrissey has yet to follow up on. Marr further clarified that the efforts to take the trademark were not to tour under the Smiths' name with a singer of Marr's choice (contrary to the claims made by Morrissey's team), but rather simply to protect the band's name and use of the name.

In February 2025 Morrissey announced tour dates in the UK and Ireland, later followed by dates across Europe throughout the year. Shows in Dublin and Manchester were opened by Brigitte Calls Me Baby.

In March 2025 Morrissey instructed his law firm, Levy & McRae, to pursue legal action against a UK-based individual for "distressing, harmful and libellous content" about him, as reported by Music Business Worldwide. In April The Times also concurred with his actions, arguing it was not parody but stalking.

In September 2025, two of Morrissey's concerts on his US tour, at the MGM Music Hall at Fenway in Boston and the Foxwoods Resort Casino in Mashantucket, Connecticut, were cancelled following what the singer called "a credible threat" on his life. The threat had been received in advance of a concert at TD Place Stadium in Ottawa, although that show went ahead as planned.

On 18 December 2025 it was announced on Morrissey's Facebook account that he had signed to Sire Records. His upcoming album was renamed once more to Make-Up Is a Lie and its lead single of the same name was released on 6 January 2026. The album, his first in over six years, was released on 6 March 2026 to mixed reviews from music critics.

The Morrissey 2026 Las Vegas residency at the Wynn Encore Theater was canceled on August 5, 2026, just one week before the scheduled opening night. Venue promoters cited "unforeseen logistical issues," and Ticketmaster automatically issued refunds, marking another event in a history of cancellations throughout the artist's career.

== Artistry ==
=== Music ===
Morrissey's music has been described as alternative rock, indie pop, indie rock and jangle pop.

=== Lyrics ===
Mark Simpson characterised Morrissey as "the anti-pop idol", representing "the last, greatest and most gravely worrying product of an era when pop music was all there was". The music journalist and biographer Johnny Rogan stated that Morrissey's œuvre seems based on "endlessly re-examining a lost, painful past". Morrissey's lyrics have been described as "dramatic, bleak, funny vignettes about doomed relationships, lonely nightclubs, the burden of the past and the prison of the home". According to Mark Simpson, there is a common feeling that his music's emphasis on the sadness of life is depressing.

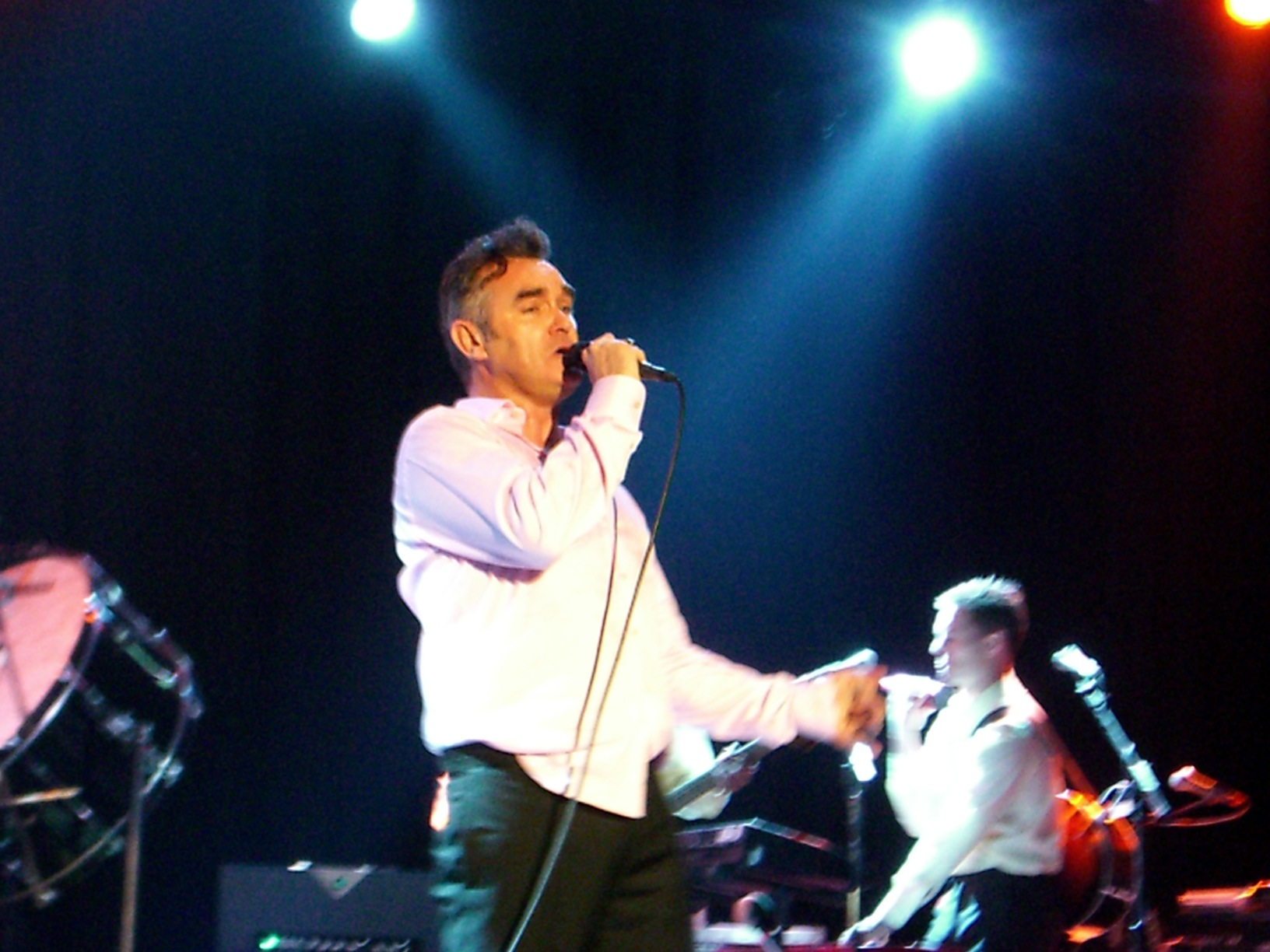
Morrissey in 2006

His lyrics are characterised by their usage of black humour, self-deprecation, and the pop vernacular. Many of his lyrics avoid mentioning the gender of the narrator, and thus provide both male and female listeners with multiple points of identification. Simpson felt that his lyrics often highlighted "the essential absurdity of gender". Discussing the Smiths' lyrics in 1992, Stringer highlighted that they placed great emphasis on the concept of Englishness, but added that unlike the contemporary Two-Tone and acid house movements, they focused on white England rather than exploring its multi-cultural counterpart. Although noting that during the 1980s emphasising white identity was a trait closely linked with right-wing politics, Stringer expressed the view that the Smiths represented "the only sustained response that white, English pop/rock music was able to make" against the Thatcher government's "appropriation of white, English national identity".

His lyrics have expressed disdain for many elements of British society, including the government, church, education system, royal family, meat-eating, money, gender, discos, fame, and relationships. In his lyrics for the Smiths, Morrissey avoided explicit descriptions of the consummation of sex; rather, he sings about the anticipation, frustration, aversion, or final disappointment with sex. Stringer suggested that this deliberate avoidance of sex was a reflection of the band's 'Englishness' because it invoked English cultures' "lack of emotional expression, the way in which feelings, and especially sexual feelings, cannot be expressed directly through casual touch, body contact and so on". Male homoerotic elements can be found in many of the Smiths' lyrics, but these also included sexualised descriptions featuring women.

Morrissey has described having "a macabre fascination" with violence. Simpson opined that Morrissey's lyrics "bleed and throb with violent imagery", citing the references to bus crashes and suicide pacts in "There is a Light that Never Goes Out", smashed teeth in "Bigmouth Strikes Again", and nuclear apocalypse in both "Ask" and "Everyday is Like Sunday". More broadly, Morrissey had a longstanding interest in thuggery, whether that be murderers, gangsters, rough trade, or skinheads.

=== Performance style ===
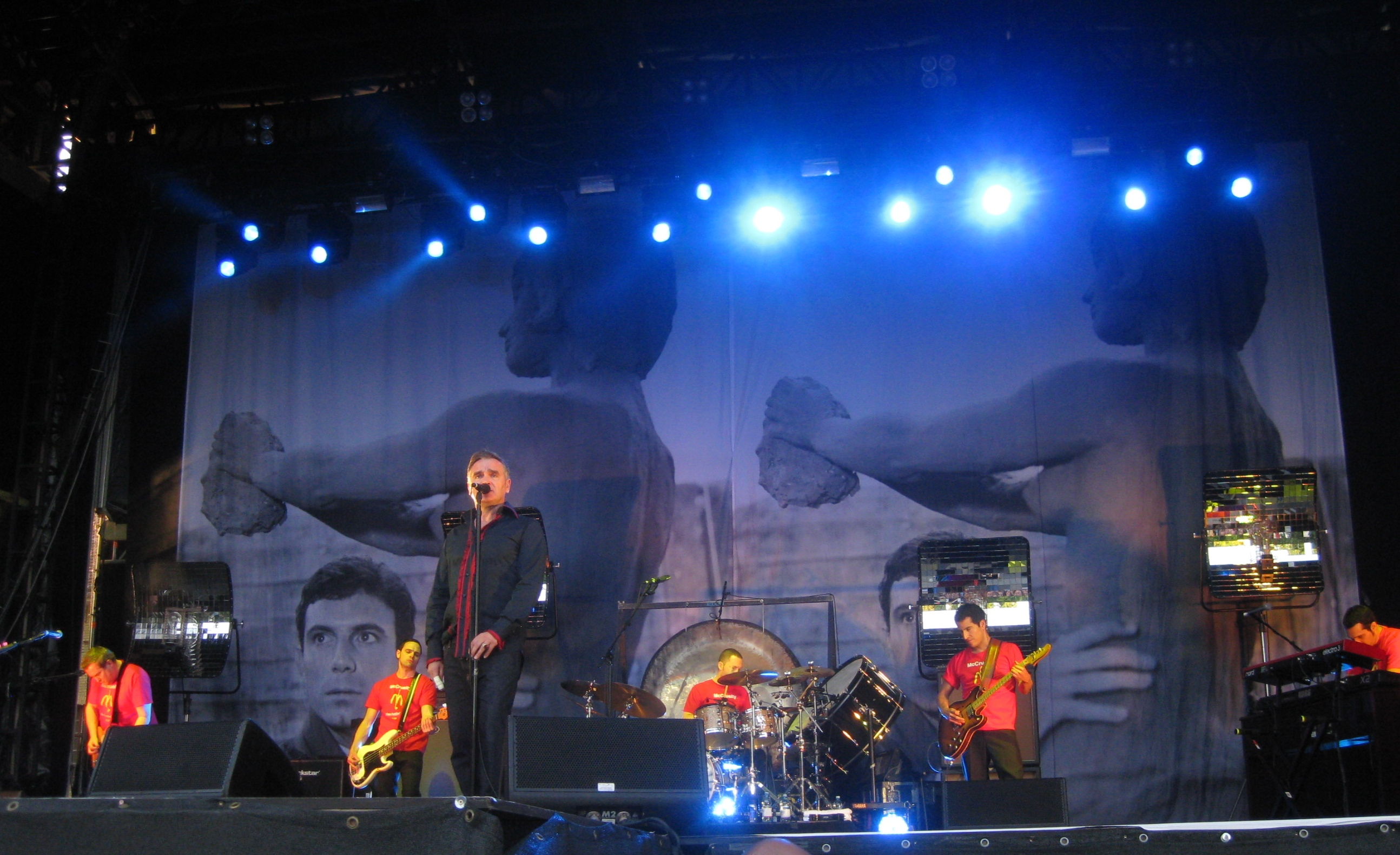
As a solo performer, Morrissey typically featured older imagery as his stage backdrop, as seen here in 2011

Morrissey's vocals have been cited as having a particularly distinctive quality. Simpson believed that Morrissey's work embodied and personified that of the "Northern Women", speaking in styles of vernacular language that would be common to many women living in northern England. In this he was strongly influenced by the Northern singer Cilla Black, who had a successful career as a pop music singer in the 1960s, as well as Viv Nicholson, who similarly earned fame during that decade. Other female singers from that decade who have been cited as an influence on Morrissey have been the Scottish Lulu, and the Essexer Sandie Shaw. However, Stringer noted that rather than expressly singing in a Mancunian working-class accent, Morrissey adopted a "very clipped, precise enunciation" and sang in "clear English diction". He is also noted for his unusual baritone vocal style (though he sometimes uses falsetto).

When performing onstage, he often whips his microphone cord about, particularly during his up-tempo tracks. Simpson believed that Morrissey often gave "slyly aggressive gestures" while onstage; he cited two instances from Top of the Pops, one in which Morrissey used hand gestures to pretend shooting at the audience during "Shoplifters of the World Unite" and another in which he turned his microphone cord into a hangman's noose while repeating the lyrics "Hang the DJ, hang the DJ" in the song "Panic". Rogan claimed that Morrissey exhibited "a power onstage which I have seldom seen from any other artiste of his generation", and that while performing he "oozes charisma, offering that peculiar combination of gauche vulnerability and athleticism".

On various occasions, Morrissey has expressed anger when he believes that bouncers and the security teams at his concerts have treated the audience poorly. For instance, at his San Antonio concert as part of the Your Arsenal tour he stopped his performance to rebuke bouncers for hitting fans.

On 12 November 2022, while playing a live show in Los Angeles at the Greek Theater, he finished the set just after 9 songs and left without notice, upsetting many fans. The bandmates hung around for over 10 minutes before realising he was not coming back and it was announced that the show was being cancelled for "unforeseen circumstances". It was speculated by some fans that the weather may have been too cold for him.

== Personal life ==
Throughout his career, Morrissey has retained an intensely private personal life. A longtime resident of Los Angeles in the US, he also has homes in Italy, Switzerland and the UK. In 2017, Los Angeles declared 10 November "Morrissey Day". Friends refer to him as "Morrissey", and he dislikes the nickname "Moz", telling one interviewer that "it's like something you'd squirt on the kitchen floor". His mother, Elizabeth Anne Dwyer, died in August 2020 at the age of 82 from gallbladder cancer. At a live gig in New York in 2023, he said that he has never owned a cell phone.

Morrissey has described himself as a lapsed Catholic and has criticised the Catholic Church. In 1991, he said that he believed in an afterlife. Morrissey is a cousin of the Irish footballer Robbie Keane and once said, "To watch [Keane] on the pitch—pacing like a lion, as weightless as an astronaut, is pure therapy." He is also a fan of boxing. Morrissey has described having clinical depression, for which he has pursued professional help.

Morrissey was asked in 2021 "What deceased personal friend do you miss the most?" and gave the answer Victoria Wood or Peter Wyngarde.

=== Public image ===
Julian Stringer has characterised Morrissey as a man with various contradictory traits, being "an ordinary, working-class 'anti-star' who nevertheless loves to hog the spotlight, a nice man who says the nastiest things about other people, a shy man who is also an outrageous narcissist". He further suggested that part of Morrissey's appeal was that he conveyed the image of a "cultivated English gentleman, being every inch the typically English 'gent' he is perfectly representative of that type's loathing for cant and hypocrisy, and his fragile, quasi-gay sexuality". Similarly, Morrissey's biographer David Bret described him as being "quintessentially English", while Mark Simpson termed him a Little Englander. Morrissey is known for his criticism of the British music press, royalty, politicians and people who eat meat. According to Bret, his "withering attacks" on those he disliked are typically delivered in a "laid-back" manner.

During the 1980s the interviewer Paul Morley stated that Morrissey "sets out to be a decent man and he succeeds because that is what he is". Eddie Sanderson, who interviewed Morrissey for The Mail on Sunday in 1992, said that "underneath all the rock star flim-flam, Morrissey is actually a very nice chap, excellent company, perfectly willing and able to talk about any subject one cared to throw at him". Having photographed him in 2004, Mischa Richter described Morrissey as "genuinely lovely".

=== Animal rights advocacy ===
A vocal advocate of animal welfare and animal rights issues, Morrissey has been a vegetarian since the age of 11. He has explained his vegetarianism by saying that "if you love animals, obviously it doesn't make sense to hurt them". Morrissey announced in 2015 that he is a vegan. He spoke of difficulties transitioning from vegetarianism to veganism. In an interview in 2018 he stated that he "refuse[s] to eat anything that had a mother" but has always had difficulties with food, stating that he only eats bread, potatoes, pasta and nuts despite the increasing availability of more varied vegan food.

Morrissey is a supporter of People for the Ethical Treatment of Animals (PETA). In recognition of his support, PETA honoured him with the Linda McCartney Memorial Award at their 25th Anniversary Gala on 10 September 2005. He appeared in a PETA advert in 2012, encouraging people to have their dogs and cats neutered to help to reduce the number of homeless pets. In 2014 PETA worked with the animator Anna Saunders to create a cartoon called Someday in honour of Morrissey's 55th birthday. It features his song "I Know It's Gonna Happen Someday" and highlights the journey of a young chick.

In January 2006 Morrissey attracted criticism when he stated that he accepts the motives behind the militant tactics of the Animal Rights Militia, saying, "I understand why fur-farmers and so-called laboratory scientists are repaid with violence—it is because they deal in violence themselves and it's the only language they understand." He has criticised people who are involved in the promotion of eating meat, including Jamie Oliver and Clarissa Dickson Wright. The latter had already been targeted by some animal rights activists for her stance on fox hunting. In response, Dickson Wright stated, "Morrissey is encouraging people to commit acts of violence and I am constantly aware that something might very well happen to me." The Conservative MP David Davis criticised Morrissey's comments, saying that "any incitement to violence is obviously wrong in a civilised society and should be investigated by the police". Morrissey has also criticised the British royal family for their involvement in fox hunting.

In 2006 Morrissey refused to include Canada in his world tour that year and supported a boycott of Canadian goods in protest against the country's annual seal hunt, which he described as a "barbaric and cruel slaughter". In 2018 he changed his approach, feeling that his previous "stance was ultimately of no use and helped no one", and pledged to donate to animal protection groups in the cities where he would perform. He also invited those groups to set up stalls at his concerts.

During an interview with Simon Armitage in 2010, Morrissey said that "you can't help but feel that the Chinese are a subspecies" due to their "horrific" treatment of animals. Armitage said: "He must have known it would make waves, he's not daft. But clearly, when it comes to animal rights and animal welfare, he's absolutely unshakable in his beliefs. In his view, if you treat an animal badly, you are less than human."

At a concert in Warsaw on 24 July 2011, Morrissey stated, "We all live in a murderous world, as the events in Norway have shown, with 97 [sic] dead. Though that is nothing compared to what happens in McDonald's and Kentucky Fried Shit every day." His comments, referencing the 2011 Norway attacks that resulted in the killing of 77 people, were described as crude and insensitive by NME. He later elaborated on his statement, saying, "If you quite rightly feel horrified at the Norway killings, then it surely naturally follows that you feel horror at the murder of ANY innocent being. You cannot ignore animal suffering simply because animals 'are not us'."

In February 2013, after much speculation, it was reported that the Staples Center had agreed for the first time to make every vendor in the arena completely vegetarian for Morrissey's performance on 1 March, contractually having all McDonald's vendors close down. In a press release, Morrissey stated, "I don't look upon it as a victory for me, but a victory for the animals." The request was previously denied to Paul McCartney. Despite these reports, the Staples Center retained some meat vendors while closing down McDonald's. Later in February, Morrissey cancelled an appearance on Jimmy Kimmel Live! after learning that the guests for that night also included the cast of Duck Dynasty, a reality show about a family who create duck calls for use in hunting. Morrissey referred to them as "animal serial killers".

In 2014, Morrissey stated that he believed there is "no difference between eating animals and paedophilia. They are both rape, violence, murder." In September 2015 he expressed his revulsion at the "Piggate" scandal, saying that if Prime Minister David Cameron had really inserted "a private part of his anatomy" into the mouth of a dead pig's severed head while at university, then it showed "a callousness and complete lack of empathy entirely unbefitting a man in his position, and he should resign". Also in September, he called the Australian politician Greg Hunt's campaign to cull 2 million invasive cats "idiocy", describing the cats as smaller versions of Cecil the lion.

Morrissey came under controversy in 2019 when he banned all meat products from a venue he was performing at in Houston, US. Rapper Jake Hill criticised Morrissey and the ban, cancelling his show in protest.

=== Sexuality ===
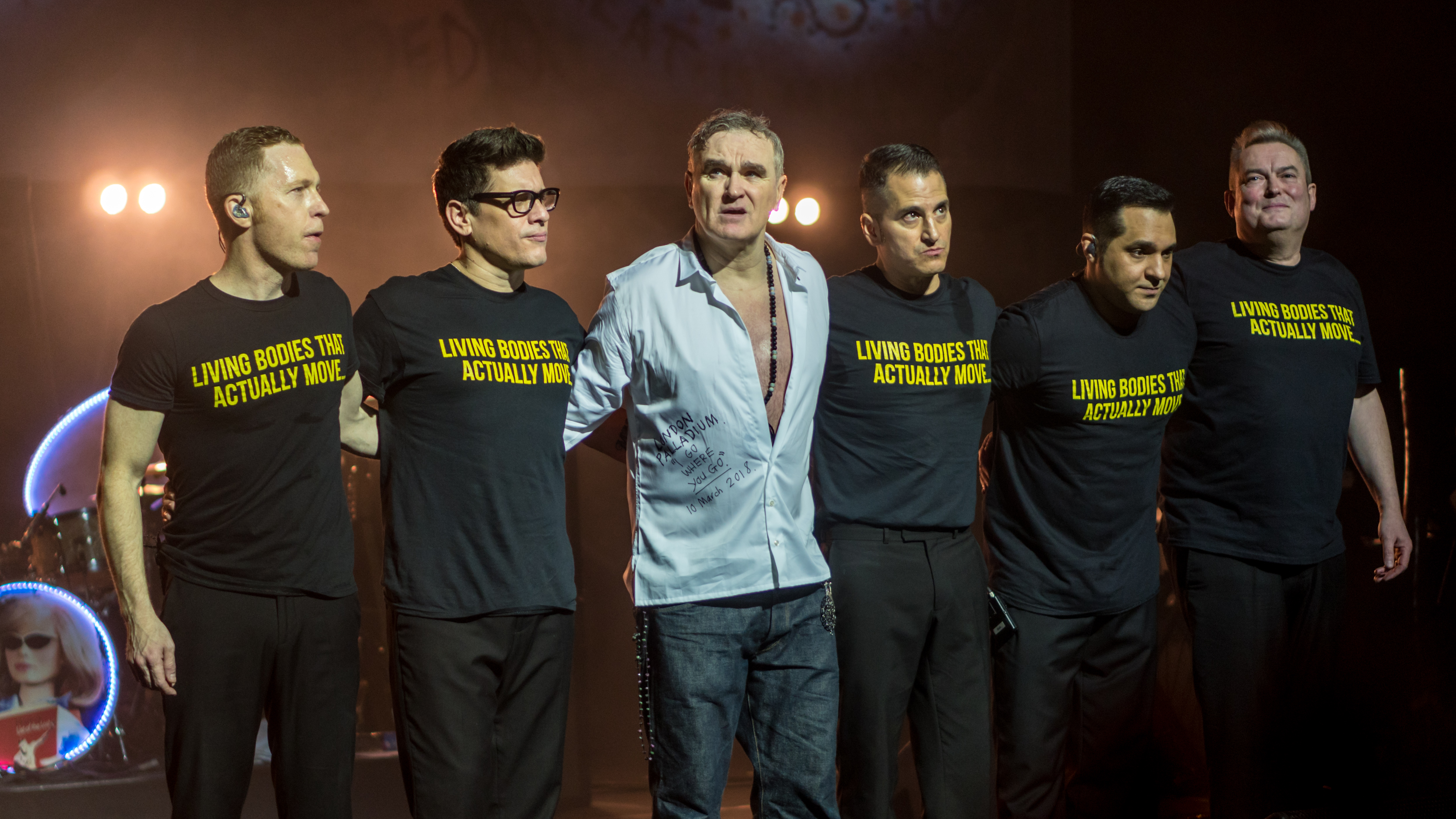
Morrissey with his band in 2018

Morrissey's sexuality has been the subject of much speculation and coverage in the British press during his career, with claims varyingly being made that he was celibate, a frustrated heterosexual, or bisexual. In a 1980 letter he described both himself and his "girlfriend" as bisexual. The Encyclopædia Britannica states that he created a "compellingly conflicted persona (loudly proclaimed celibacy offset by coy hints of closeted homosexuality)" that has "made him a peculiar heartthrob". Speculation was further fuelled by the frequent references to gay subculture and slang in his lyrics. In 2006 Liz Hoggard from The Independent said: "Only 15 years after homosexuality had been decriminalised, his lyrics flirted with every kind of gay subculture."

During his years with the Smiths, Morrissey professed to be celibate, which stood out at a time when much of pop music was dominated by visible sexuality. Marr said in a 1984 interview that Morrissey "doesn't participate in sex at the moment and hasn't done so for a while". Repeatedly, interviewers asked Morrissey if he was gay, which he denied. In response to one such inquiry in 1985, he stated that "I don't recognise such terms as heterosexuality, homosexuality, bisexuality, and I think it's important that there's someone in pop music who's like that. These words do great damage, they confuse people and they make people feel unhappy, so I want to do away with them." As his career developed, there was increased pressure placed on him to come out of the closet, although he presented himself as a non-practising bisexual. In a 1989 interview he said that he was "always attracted to men and women who were never attracted to me" and thus he did not have "relationships at all". In a 1989 interview Morrissey stated: "I don't fit into any sexual category at all so I don't feel people see it as being sexual, but as being intimate."

In 1997, Morrissey said that he had abandoned celibacy and that he had a relationship with a Cockney boxer. That person was revealed in his autobiography to be Jake Walters. Their relationship began in 1994 and they lived together until 1996. In a March 2013 interview, Walters said, "Morrissey and I have been friends for a long time, probably around 20 years." Morrissey was later attached to an Iranian-American woman named Tina Dehghani, with whom he described in his autobiography as having "my first experience of uncluttered commitment," and with whom he considered having a child. In his autobiography Morrissey also mentions a relationship with a younger Italian man, known only as "Gelato", with whom he sought to buy a house in around 2006.

In 2013, he released a statement that said, "Unfortunately, I am not homosexual. In technical fact, I am humasexual. I am attracted to humans. But, of course ... not many."

=== Political opinions ===
==== British politics ====
In an academic paper on the Smiths, Julian Stringer characterised the band as "one of Britain's most overtly political groups", while Andrew Warns termed them the "most anti-capitalist of bands". Simon Goddard described Morrissey as being "pro-working class, anti-elite and anti-institution. That includes all political parties, parliament itself, all public schools, Oxbridge, the Catholic church, the monarchy, the EU, the BBC, the broadsheet press and the music press. Because his comments are not consistent with any one political agenda it confuses people, especially on the left. If anything, he's a professional refusenik."

Morrissey has exhibited enduring anti-royalist views from his teenage years and has fiercely criticised the British monarchy. In a 1985 interview with Simon Garfield, he stated that he had always "despised royalty" and that royalist sentiment is a "false devotion". In a 2011 interview he publicly identified as a republican, stating that he regarded the British royal family as "benefit scroungers and nothing else". In a 2012 interview with Stephen Colbert, he spoke out against the Diamond Jubilee of Queen Elizabeth II, stating: "It was a celebration of what? 60 years of dictatorship. She's not [my Queen]. I'm not a subject."

Morrissey's first solo album, Viva Hate, included a track entitled "Margaret on the Guillotine", a jab at Margaret Thatcher. The London Metropolitan Police investigated Morrissey as a result of the song's lyrics. Following her death in 2013, Morrissey called her "a terror without an atom of humanity" and said "every move she made was charged by negativity". He described Thatcher's successor, John Major, as "no one's idea of a Prime Minister... a terrible human mistake". His seventh studio album, You Are the Quarry includes the track "Irish Blood, English Heart", described as "the most unambiguously political of his career to date", with lyrics denouncing the Conservative Party, the Labour Party, royalism, and the prominent historical English politician and soldier Oliver Cromwell. During the Iraq War he described George W. Bush and Tony Blair as "insufferable, egotistical insane despots". In February 2006, Morrissey stated he had been interviewed by the US Federal Bureau of Investigation and by British intelligence after speaking out against the American and British governments. He said: "They were trying to determine if I was a threat to the government . . . it didn't take them long to realise that I'm not". In 2010, he endorsed Marr's statement that Prime Minister David Cameron was forbidden to like the Smiths, criticising the Prime Minister's hobby of stag hunting. In response to the Manchester Arena bombing in May 2017, Morrissey criticised Prime Minister Theresa May, Mayor of London Sadiq Khan, Mayor of Greater Manchester and future Prime Minister Andy Burnham and Elizabeth II for their statements regarding the bombing.

==== European Union ====
In 2013, Morrissey said that he "nearly voted" for the UK Independence Party, expressing his admiration for party leader Nigel Farage and endorsing Farage's Euroscepticism regarding UK membership of the European Union. In 2019, Morrissey said: "It's obvious that he [Farage] would make a good prime minister—if any of us can actually remember what a good prime minister is."

In October 2016, Morrissey praised the UK's referendum on EU membership as "magnificent" and said the BBC had "persistently denigrated" supporters of the Leave campaign. In 2019, he said, "I didn't vote in the referendum, although I can see how there is absolutely nothing attractive about the EU." He added, "My view has always been that the result of the referendum must be carried through. If the vote had been remain there would be absolutely no question that we would remain. In the interest of true democracy, you cannot argue against the wish of the people."

==== Racist comments and support for Anne Marie Waters ====
Morrissey has faced ongoing accusations of racism since the early 1990s from media and commentators around the globe, which were prompted by his comments, actions, and recorded material, but he has rejected these accusations.

The ones who listen to the entire song, the way I sing it, and my vocal expression know only too well that I'm no racist and glorifier of xenophobia. The phrase "England for the English" [used in the song] is in quotes, so those who call the song racist are not listening. The song tells of the sadness and regret that I feel for anyone joining such a movement [as the far-right National Front].

— Morrissey, on "The National Front Disco" (quoted in 2004).

Various sources accused Morrissey of racism for making reference to the National Front, a far-right political party, in his 1992 song "The National Front Disco"; it has been argued that this criticism ignored the ironic context of the song, which pitied rather than glorified the party's supporters. According to Bret, these and other allegations of racism typically entailed decontextualising lyrics from Morrissey songs such as "Bengali in Platforms" and "Asian Rut". NME also accused Morrissey of racism on the basis of the imagery he employed during his 1992 performance at the Madstock festival at Finsbury Park in north London for the reunion of Madness; Morrissey included images of skinhead girls as a backdrop, and wrapped himself in a Union Flag. Conversely, these actions resulted in Morrissey being booed off stage by a group of neo-Nazi skinheads in the audience, who believed that he was appropriating skinhead culture. Members of Madness themselves expressed dismay for his performance, with lead singer Suggs saying, "I was disappointed that he knew how inflammatory that would be to a Madness audience. For us, all that symbolism represents a really bad time in our career, and part of the reason for us packing it all in." Lee Thompson even said that Morrissey should have never supported them to begin with.

Morrissey sued NME for libel over a 2007 article that criticised him after he allegedly told a reporter that British identity had disappeared because of immigration. He was quoted as saying: "It's very difficult [to return to England] because, although I don't have anything against people from other countries, the higher the influx into England the more the British identity disappears. ... the gates of England are flooded. The country's been thrown away." His manager described the article as a "character assassination". In 2008, The Word apologised in court for a piece written by David Quantick, which commented on the 2007 NME article and suggested Morrissey was a racist. Morrissey accepted The Word's apology. The legal suit against NME began in October 2011 after Morrissey won a pre-trial hearing. Morrissey's case against NME editor Conor McNicholas and publisher IPC was due to have been heard in July 2012. The parties settled the dispute in June 2012, with NME issuing a public apology, saying: "We do not believe [Morrissey] is a racist." Morrissey's lawyer said that "no money was sought as part of a settlement. ... The NME apology in itself is settlement enough and it closes the case."

Morrissey's 2010 statement in which he described the Chinese as a "subspecies" in reference to their treatment of animals was widely condemned as racist by many sources.

In October 2017, Morrissey said that the 2017 UKIP leadership election had been rigged against the anti-Islam activist Anne Marie Waters. In April 2018, he endorsed Waters's new far-right party, For Britain. In his open letter in support of the party, he stated that he despised racism and fascism, and that the party had been wrongly characterised that way by the mainstream media. He added that he would "do anything for my Muslim friends, and I know they would do anything for me", but he believed For Britain was the only British political party "that can safeguard our security". He subsequently wore a party badge during several performances in New York City in 2019. Morrissey's support for For Britain saw adverts of his album California Son withdrawn from Merseyrail stations, and several record stores refusing to stock the album. In June 2018, Morrissey reaffirmed his support for Waters and For Britain, stating "she believes in British heritage, freedom of speech, and she wants everyone in the UK to live under the same law. I find this compelling." At the same time, Morrissey also expressed comments criticising the treatment of the far-right activist Tommy Robinson, and said: "It's very obvious that Labour or the Tories do not believe in free speech ... I mean, look at the shocking treatment of Tommy Robinson."

In June 2019, Morrissey rejected further accusations of racism against him, saying, "The word is meaningless now. Everyone ultimately prefers their own race—does this make everyone racist?" In response to his recent political comments, his fellow singer-songwriter Billy Bragg accused Morrissey of dragging the legacy of Marr and the Smiths "through the dirt". Nick Cave wrote an open letter defending Morrissey's right to freedom of speech to voice his beliefs, as well as arguing that his musical legacy should be kept separate from his political opinions.

In January 2023, in response to rumours that Miley Cyrus had decided to pull her vocals from the song "I Am Veronica" from his album Bonfire of Teenagers over his political views, Morrissey published a statement on his website rejecting claims that he was far-right, and further clarified his political stance;

My politics are straightforward: I recognize realities. Some realities horrify me, and some do not, but I accept that I was not created so that others might gratify me and delight me with all that they think and do – what a turgid life that would be. I've been offended all of my life, and it has strengthened me, and I am glad. I wouldn't have the journey any other way. Only by hearing the opinions of others can we form truly rational views, and therefore we must never accept a beehive society that refuses to reflect a variety of views.

==== American politics ====
At a Dublin concert in June 2004, Morrissey commented on the death of Ronald Reagan, saying that he would have preferred if George W. Bush had died instead. Morrissey openly criticised the war on terror and condemned Bush as "the world's most famous active terrorist, as he bizarrely bombs the innocent people of Iraq out of existence in the name of freedom and democracy" in his autobiography.

During a January 2008 concert, Morrissey remarked "God Bless Barack Obama" and criticised Hillary Clinton, naming her "Billary Clinton". In 2015, he accused Obama of not doing enough to tackle police brutality, stating he could not "see him doing anything at all for the black community except warning them that they must respect the security forces." He endorsed Clinton in the 2016 United States presidential election, although he later criticised her as "the face and voice of pooled money" and praised Bernie Sanders as "sane and intelligent", accusing the US media of paying insufficient attention to his campaign. Morrissey called Donald Trump "Donald Thump" and accused him of not having any sympathy for the victims of the Pulse nightclub shooting in Orlando, Florida. When asked in a 2017 interview if he would push a button that would kill Trump if given the opportunity, he responded that he "would, for the safety of the human race." He later said the United States Secret Service questioned him over his comments on Trump.

== Impact and legacy ==
Morrissey's biographer David Bret has characterised him as an artist who divides opinion among those who love him and those who loathe him, with little space for compromise between the two. The press termed him the "Pope of Mope".

=== Fandom ===
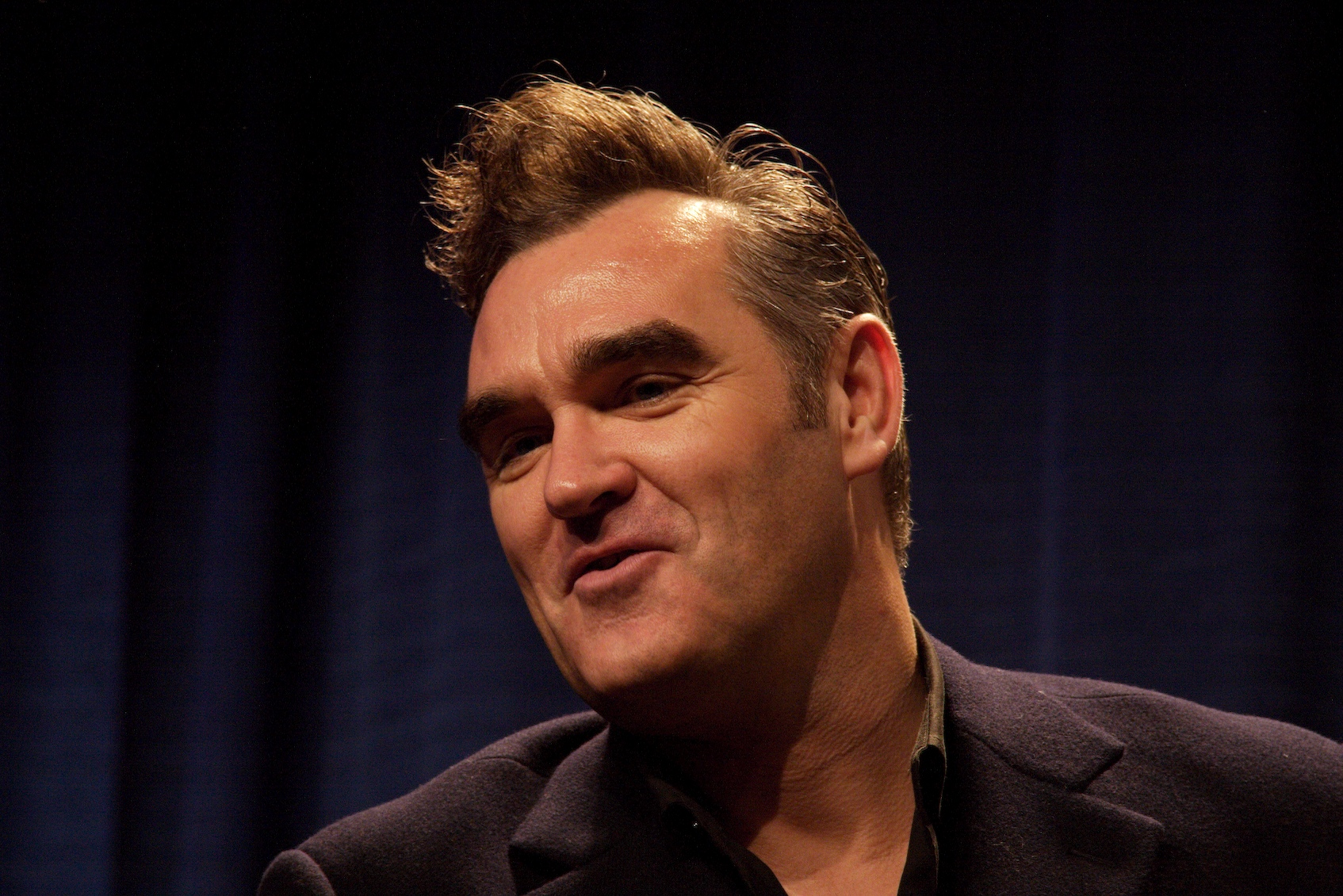
Morrissey in 2006

Simpson stated that Morrissey had a global fan following that was unrivalled in its devotion to the singer, characterising this as "the kind of devotion that only dead stars command" normally. Morrissey's fans have been described as being among the most dedicated of pop and rock fans. The music magazine NME considers Morrissey to be "one of the most influential artists ever", while The Independent says, "Most pop stars have to be dead before they reach the iconic status he has reached in his lifetime." According to Bret, Morrissey's fanbase "religiously followed his every pitfall and triumph". Simpson highlighted an example during the US leg of Morrissey's 1996 Maladjusted tour in which young men asked the singer to autograph their necks, which they subsequently had permanently tattooed into their skin. Rogan compared Morrissey to Wilde's character Dorian Gray "in reverse; while he slowly ages, his audience remains young". Rogan also noted that while onstage, Morrissey "revels in the messianic adoration" of his fans.

Soon after achieving national fame, Morrissey became a gay icon, with Bret noting that by the start of his solo career, Morrissey already had a "massive gay following". This development was influenced by the speculation around his own sexual orientation, his lyrics that dealt with such subjects as age-gap sex and rent boys, as well as the Smiths' heavy use of gay and camp imagery on their record covers. Morrissey's gay following was not restricted to Western countries, for he remained popular within the Japanese gay community as well.

Morrissey also has a significant Hispanic fanbase, particularly in Mexico and among Mexican Americans (Chicanos) in the western United States. His music has resonated with these communities because of its similarities to the traditional Mexican music genre of ranchera, which revolves around romance, morose metaphors and slow ballads. Morrissey's popularity among Hispanics became widespread knowledge after he toured Latin America for the first time in 2000. Chuck Klosterman, in a 2002 profile for Spin that analysed Morrissey's relationship with the Latino community, theorised that Morrissey's rockabilly influences were seen as a nod to the greaser culture popular among Latinos and that his status as the son of Irish immigrants in England resonated with immigrant families in Los Angeles.

On numerous occasions, Morrissey has acknowledged his Mexican fanbase. During a 1999 concert in California, he said, "I wish I was born Mexican, but it's too late for that now." He released the song "Mexico" in 2004, which contained lyrics that condemned white privilege. The film 25 Live evidences a particularly strong following among the singer's Latino/Chicano fans. A tribute band named Mexrrissey performs Morrissey covers live translated into Spanish. The 2018 Marvel film Ant-Man and the Wasp contains a scene in which the character Luis discusses how his grandmother owned a jukebox that "only played Morrissey" because of Latinos' love for his music. The director Peyton Reed noted that it was a "funny, really specific true-to-life detail".

Several Morrissey fansites exist. In the early 2000s Morrissey issued a "cease and desist" notification against the fan website Morrissey-Solo for publishing claims, never proven, that Morrissey had failed to pay members of his touring personnel. In 2011, he issued a lifetime concert ban against the site owner who, it was claimed, had caused "intentional distress to Morrissey and Morrissey's band" over many years. Another fansite, True-To-You, enjoys a close relationship with Morrissey and functioned as his official website for statements until May 2017. In April 2018, Morrissey launched his own website, Morrissey Central.

=== Influence ===
Bookish, reclusive-but-pugnacious—avowedly celibate—with an almost Puritan disdain for cheap glamour and armed with a deeply unhealthy interest in language, wit and ideas Morrissey succeeded in perverting pop music for a while and making it that most absurd of things, literary. Some were moved to talk of how much Morrissey owed that blousy Anglo-Irish nineteenth-century torch-singer and stand-up comedian Oscar Wilde, the "first pop star". Arguably, poor Oscar was merely an early failed and somewhat overweight prototype for Morrissey.

— Mark Simpson, 2004.

Morrissey is routinely referred to as an influential artist, both in his solo career and with the Smiths. The BBC has referred to him as "one of the most influential figures in the history of British pop", and NME named the Smiths the "most influential artist ever" in a 2002 poll, even topping the Beatles. Rolling Stone, naming him one of the greatest singers of all time in a 2014 poll, noted that his "rejection of convention" in his vocal style and lyrics is the reason "why he redefined the sound of British rock for the past quarter-century". Morrissey's enduring influence has been ascribed to his wit, the "infinite capacity for interpretation" in his lyrics, and his appeal to the "constant navel gazing, reflection, solipsism" of generations of "disenfranchised youth", offering unusually intimate "companionship" to broad demographics. Paul A. Woods described Morrissey as "Britain's unlikeliest rock 'n' roll star in several decades", noting that at the same time he was also "its most essential". Bret described him as "probably the most intellectually gifted and imaginative lyricist of his generation", listing him alongside Leonard Cohen, Bob Dylan and Jacques Brel as being one of "the monstres sacrés".

The journalist Mark Simpson calls Morrissey "one of the greatest pop lyricists—and probably the greatest-ever lyricist of desire—that has ever moaned" and observes that "he is fully present in his songs as few other artists are, in a way that fans of most other performers ... wouldn't tolerate for a moment." Simpson also argues that "After Morrissey there could be no more pop stars. His was an impossible act to follow ... [his] unrivalled knowledge of the pop canon, his unequaled imagination of what it might mean to be a pop star, and his breathtakingly perverse ambition to turn it into great art, could only exhaust the form forever".

In 2006 Morrissey was voted the second greatest living British icon in a poll held by the BBC's Culture Show. The All Music Guide to Rock asserts that Morrissey's "lyrical preoccupations", particularly themes dealing with English identity, proved extremely influential on subsequent artists. The journalist Philip Collins also described him as a major influence on modern music and "the best British lyricist in living memory". In 1998 he received an Ivor Novello Award for Outstanding Contribution to British Music from the British Academy of Songwriters, Composers and Authors. In 2002 NME, by this point a critic of Morrissey, nevertheless considered him to be the "most influential artist ever". In 2004 Q gave him its best songwriter award.

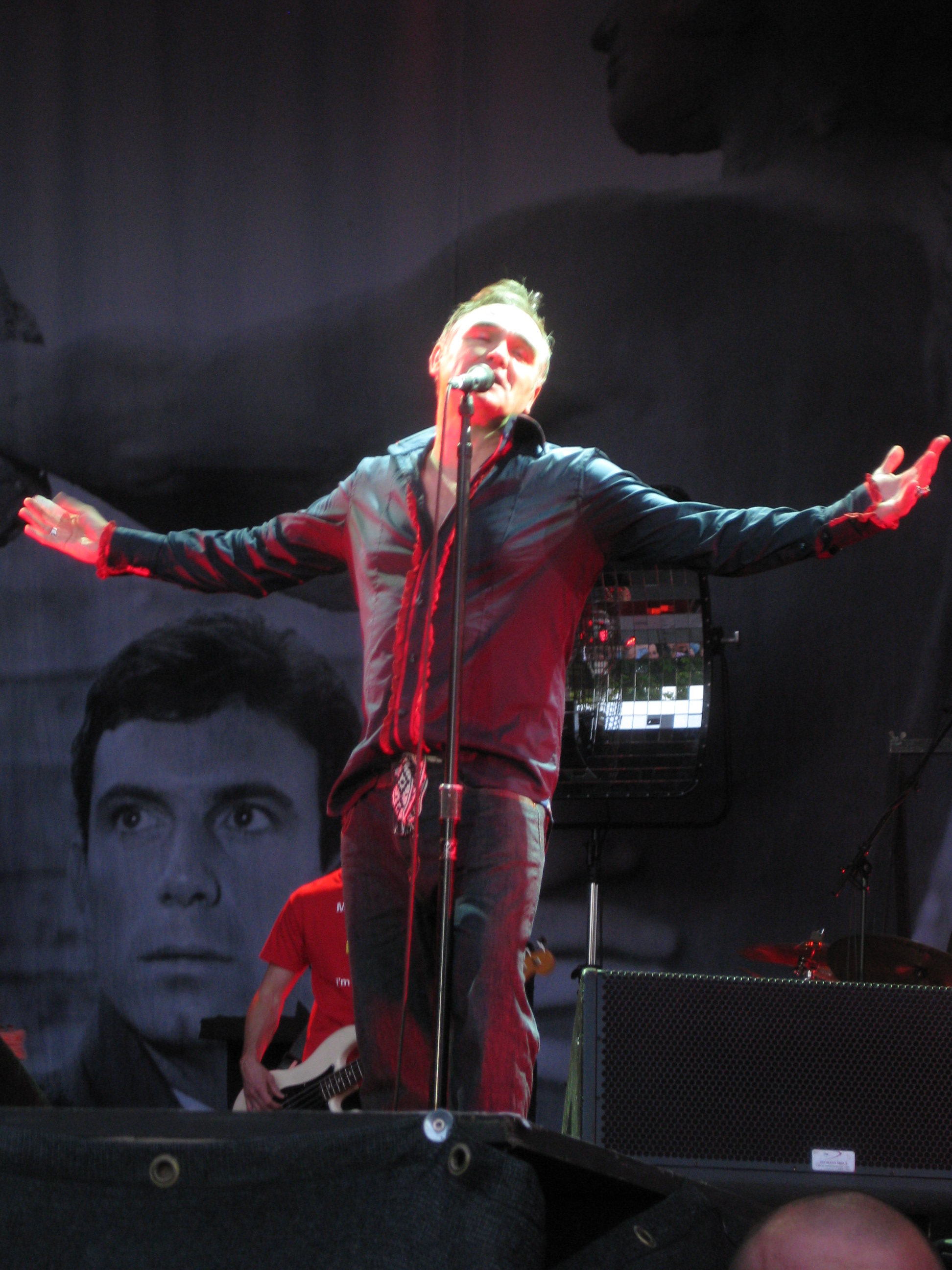
Morrissey in 2011

In November 2008 Rolling Stone magazine ranked Morrissey as 92nd of "The 100 Greatest Singers of All Time". The list was compiled from ballots cast by a panel of 179 "music experts", such as Bruce Springsteen, Alicia Keys and Bono, who were asked to name their 20 favourite vocalists.

Other scholars have responded favourably to Morrissey's work, including academic symposia at various universities including University of Limerick and Manchester Metropolitan University. Gavin Hopps, a research fellow and literary scholar at the University of St Andrews, wrote a full-length academic study of Morrissey's work, calling him comparable to Oscar Wilde, John Betjeman and Philip Larkin, and noting similarities between Morrissey and Samuel Beckett.

The British Food Journal featured an article in 2008 that applied Morrissey's lyrics to building positive business relationships. A book of academic essays edited by Eoin Devereux, Aileen Dillane and Martin Power, Morrissey: Fandom, Representations and Identities, which focuses on Morrissey's solo career, was published in 2011.

Morrissey is regarded as an important innovator in the indie music scene; while in 2004 Pitchfork Media called him "one of the most singular figures in Western popular culture from the last 20 years." A Los Angeles Times critic wrote that Morrissey "patented the template for modern indie rock" and that many bands playing at the Coachella Valley Music and Arts Festival "would not be there—or at least, would not sound the same—were it not for him". Similarly, the critic Steven Wells called Morrissey "the man who more or less invented indie" and an artist "who more than anybody else personifies" indie culture. Stephen Thomas Erlewine of Allmusic writes that the Smiths and Morrissey "inspired every band of note" in the Britpop era, including Suede, Blur, Oasis and Pulp. Other major artists including Jeff Buckley and Thom Yorke have also been influenced by Morrissey.

Colin Meloy of the Decemberists, who recorded a 2005 EP of Morrissey covers titled Colin Meloy Sings Morrissey, acknowledged Morrissey's influence on his songwriting: "You could either bask in that glow of fatalistic narcissism, or you could think it was funny. I always thought that was an interesting dynamic in his songwriting, and I can only aspire to have that kind of dynamic in my songs". Brandon Flowers of the American rock band the Killers has revealed his admiration for Morrissey on several occasions and admits that his interest for writing songs about murder such as "Jenny Was a Friend of Mine" and "Midnight Show" traces back to Morrissey singing about loving "the romance of crime" in the song "Sister I'm a Poet". Flowers was quoted as saying, "I studied that line a lot. And it's kind of embedded in me". Noel Gallagher called Morrissey "the best lyricist I've ever heard".

A 2017 biographical film of Morrissey's early years, England Is Mine, was written and directed by Mark Gill and stars Jack Lowden. The film, which co-stars Jessica Brown Findlay, premiered at the closing gala of the Edinburgh Film Festival on 2 July 2017, and went into wide release in the UK and US in August 2017.

In an April 2021 episode of The Simpsons titled "Panic on the Streets of Springfield", Morrissey inspired the parody character of Quilloughby. Voiced by Benedict Cumberbatch, Quilloughby is portrayed as a romantic figment of Lisa Simpson's imagination. She has her dream shattered when she finds out that he has aged into a grey, meat-eating overweight frontman with anti-immigrant views. The episode was criticised by Morrissey as based on "complete ignorance". In 2025, Robbie Williams previewed his new album to a crowd of 600, which featured a song co-written by former Take That bandmate Gary Barlow called "Morrissey".

== Awards and nominations ==
Brit Awards

Year	Nominee / work	Award	Result
1995	Himself	Best British Male	Nominated
2005	Himself	Best British Male	Nominated

GAFFA Awards

Year	Nominee / work	Award	Result
2005	Himself	Årets Udenlandske Sanger	Won
2007	Himself	Årets Udenlandske Sanger	Nominated

Grammy Awards

Year	Nominee / work	Award	Result
1993	Your Arsenal	Best Alternative Music Album	Nominated

Ivor Novello Awards

Year	Nominee / work	Award	Result
1998	Himself	Outstanding Contribution to British Music	Won

Lunas del Auditorio

Year	Nominee / work	Award	Result
2007	Himself	Best Foreign Rock Artist	Nominated

MOJO Awards

Year	Nominee / work	Award	Result
2004	Himself	Icon Award	Won
2005	Himself	Inspiration Award	Nominated

Meteor Music Awards

Year	Nominee / work	Award	Result
2005	Himself	Best International Male	Won
2010	Himself	Best International Male	Nominated

NME Awards

Year	Nominee / work	Award	Result
1984	Himself	Best Songwriter	Won
1985	Himself	Best Songwriter	Won
1985	Himself	Best Dressed	Won
1985	Himself	Best Haircut	Won
1985	Himself	Best Male Singer	Won
1986	Himself	Best Male Singer	Won
1986	Himself	Most Wonderful Human Being	Won
1987	Himself	Most Wonderful Human Being	Won
1987	Himself	Best Male Singer	Won
1987	Himself	Safe Sex	Won
1988	Himself	Favourite NME Cover Of 1988	Won
1988	Himself	Most Wonderful Human Being	Won
1988	Himself	Best Solo Artist	Won
1989	Himself	Best Solo Artist	Won
1990	Himself	Best Solo Artist	Won
1991	Himself	Best Solo Artist	Won
1992	Himself	Best Solo Artist	Won
2005	Himself	Best Solo Artist	Nominated
2005	Himself	Hero of the Year	Nominated
2005	Himself	Hottest Man	Nominated
2006	Morrissey: Who Put the M in Manchester	Best Music DVD	Nominated

PLUG Awards

Year	Nominee / work	Award	Result
2006	Morrissey: Who Put the M in Manchester	Best Music DVD of the Year	Nominated

Pollstar Concert Industry Awards

Year	Nominee / work	Award	Result	Ref.
1987	The Smiths	Small Hall Tour of the Year	Nominated	

Q Awards

Year	Nominee / work	Award	Result
1994	Himself	Q Songwriter Award	Won
2004	"Irish Blood, English Heart"	Best Track	Nominated

Rober Awards Music Poll

Year	Nominee / work	Award	Result
2013	"Satellite of Love"	Best Cover Version	Nominated
2014	Himself	Comeback of the Year	Won

== Band personnel ==
Current members

- Jesse Tobias – guitar (2004–present)
- Matt Walker – drums (2007–2020, 2024–present)
- Juan Galeano – bass (2022–present)
- Camila Grey – keyboards (2023–present)
- Carmen Vandenberg – guitar (2023–present)

== Discography ==
=== The Smiths ===
- The Smiths (1984)
- Meat Is Murder (1985)
- The Queen Is Dead (1986)
- Strangeways, Here We Come (1987)

=== Solo ===
- Viva Hate (1988)
- Bona Drag (1990)
- Kill Uncle (1991)
- Your Arsenal (1992)
- Vauxhall and I (1994)
- Southpaw Grammar (1995)
- Maladjusted (1997)
- You Are the Quarry (2004)
- Ringleader of the Tormentors (2006)
- Years of Refusal (2009)
- World Peace Is None of Your Business (2014)
- Low in High School (2017)
- California Son (2019)
- I Am Not a Dog on a Chain (2020)
- Make-Up Is a Lie (2026)

== Publications ==
=== Publications by Morrissey ===
- The New York Dolls. by Steven Patrick Morrissey.
  - Manchester: Babylon, 1981.
  - Reprint. Manchester: Babylon, 1995. ISBN 978-0-907188-50-6.
- James Dean Is Not Dead, Manchester: Babylon, 1983. ISBN 978-0-907188-06-3. By Steven Patrick Morrissey.
- Exit Smiling, Manchester: Babylon, 1998. ISBN 978-0-907188-47-6. Edition of 1000 copies. By Steven Patrick Morrissey.
- Morrissey (2013). Autobiography. London: Penguin Classic. ISBN 978-0-14-139481-7.
- List of the Lost. London: Penguin, 2015. ISBN 978-0-14-198296-0.

=== Publications with contributions by Morrissey ===
- Marc Bolan: Wilderness of the Mind. London: Xanadu, 1992. ISBN 978-1-85480-155-5. By John Willans and Caron Thomas. With an introduction by Morrissey. About Marc Bolan.
- Cockney Reject. John Black, 2005. ISBN 978-1-84454-881-1. By Jeff Turner and Gary Bushell. With a foreword by Morrissey. About Cockney Rejects.
- The Autobiography: Bowie, Bolan and the Brooklyn Boy. New York: HarperCollins, 2007. ISBN 978-0-00-722945-1. By Tony Visconti. With a foreword by Morrissey.

== See also ==
- List of animal rights advocates
- List of British Grammy Award winners and nominees
