= List of the Lost =

- First edition
- Author: Morrissey
- Language: English
- Publisher: Penguin Books
- Publication date: 24 September 2015
- Pages: 118
- ISBN: 9780141982960

List of the Lost is a novel written by Morrissey, released on 24 September 2015. The book represents his first non-lyrical fiction publication. It is written in the "stream of consciousness" narrative style.

== Plot ==
The book is about a 1970s relay team in Boston who accidentally kill a homeless person, whose death brings misfortune to the team.

== History ==
In August 2015 it was announced that List of the Lost would be published later that year through Penguin Books in the UK, Ireland, Australia, India, New Zealand, and South Africa. It is Morrissey's first -- and to date, only -- fictional book, having previously written an autobiography, published in 2013. The book was released on 24 September 2015.

== Reception ==
The book received largely negative reviews. The Independent's Adam Sherwin described it as "a leaden festival of self-pity" but conceded that it was "lifted, however, by the occasional brilliant Wildean epigram." For The Guardian, Michael Hann urged his readers "Do not read this book", due to the lack of engaging dialogue, and implausibility of the premise. In a review for The Daily Beast, Nico Hines accused the book of being a "bizarre misogynistic ramble" due to its "repulsive" portrayal of women, as most in the book are obsessed with sex. In The Telegraph's 1/5 star review, Charlotte Runcie wrote that "List of the Lost is terrible and, at only 118 pages, still feels overlong," going on to describe the novel as "poorly conceived, awkwardly expressed and lazily imagined." John Niven of the New Statesman, responding to critics who wrote that the book might have been improved by a strong editor, opined that "asking a decent editor to save this book would have been like asking a doctor to help a corpse that had fallen from the top of the Empire State Building."

NME's Jordan Bassett scored the book 2/5 calling it "a confused, often quite embarrassing slab of cringeworthy sex clichés and bizarre, stilted dialogue." In a review for the Financial Times, Ludovic Hunter-Tilney found the book to contain "a few viciously turned barbs" but was otherwise "more self-indulgent and tedious than its slender dimensions would suggest possible". The review concluded by stating that it "sullies the reputation of the publishing house that has been foolish or greedy enough to commit it to print". Ed Cummings' review in The Observer echoed this sentiment, stating that "the spineless mandarins at Penguin who brought this to print should be ashamed of themselves."

In virtually the only at least partially positive mainstream review, writing for The Times, Melissa Katsoulis opined that "critics miss the point by dismissing it as pretentious. It's all about the lyricism." She praised Morrissey's attempt at novel writing as "deliberately eccentric in the high Modernist style." Katsoulis ultimately indicated that the work is "a ludicrous gothic fantasy" that is "unreadable in places" but acts as an "antidote to all those earnest, urban epics by the graduate trainees of the literary scene." Katsoulis concludes by praising Morrissey himself (i.e., not the novel) as both "inimitable and irreplaceable."

Outside of the UK, Brazilian critic Jonatan Silva, in a review for A Escotilha, said that in List of the Lost Morrissey attempted to create a kind of pulp fiction à la Oscar Wilde, but failed in trying to connect the book with the spirit of sports and literature. He advised that readers who expected the same lyricism as found in Morrissey's autobiography would be disappointed.

In Spain, Álvaro García of El País wrote "Critics wanted to get Morrissey since his autobiography" and "the novel works as another argument for his haters since, regardless of all criticism, the book remains as a top seller in Britain."

Owen Richardson of The Sydney Morning Herald wrote that "List of the Lost reads like the outcome of the perversity, or simple lack of self-awareness, that induces a writer to run with his bad qualities. It's terrible, though in such a bizarre way, unique even, that it might have prospects as a cult book, or at any rate an enduring curiosity. But I wouldn't bet on it."

The response on social media was critical particularly of a sex scene in the book. In December 2015, the novel was announced as the winner of the Literary Review Bad Sex Award.
