= Roy's Keen =

Single by Morrissey

from the album Maladjusted
- B-side: "Lost"; "The Edges Are No Longer Parallel"
- Released: 6 October 1997 (UK)
- Genre: Rock
- Length: 3:36
- Label: Island (UK)
- Songwriter(s): Morrissey, Alain Whyte
- Producer(s): Steve Lillywhite

Morrissey singles chronology
"Alma Matters" (1997)	"Roy's Keen" (1997)	"Satan Rejected My Soul" (1997)

"Roy's Keen" is a song by Morrissey, released as a single in October 1997. It was the second single to be taken from the Maladjusted album and was the third solo Morrissey single not to feature himself in the cover picture, instead using a photograph of two boys taken by Roger Mayne on London's Southam Street in the 1950s.

The single reached number 42 on the UK Singles Chart. Its failure to reach the top 40 meant a performance of the song recorded for Top of the Pops did not air until it was shown on Top of the Pops 2 in 2003.

The title refrain is a pun on the name of former Manchester United footballer Roy Keane – as Morrissey acknowledged during live performances of the song by changing words to "never seen a keener midfielder". The song was played over the closing credits of Keane's 2002 documentary As I See It.

Despite being released as a single, the song was omitted from Maladjusted's remastered CD reissue in 2009.

== Track listings ==
=== 7" vinyl and cassette ===
1. "Roy's Keen"
2. "Lost"

=== 12" vinyl and CD (UK) ===
1. "Roy's Keen"
2. "Lost"
3. "The Edges Are No Longer Parallel"

Country	Record label	Format	Catalogue number
UK	Island	7" vinyl	IS671
UK	Island	12" vinyl	12IS671
UK	Island	Compact disc	CID671
UK	Island	Cassette	CIS671

== Musicians ==
- Morrissey: vocals
- Martin Boorer: guitar
- Alain Whyte: guitar
- Jonny Bridgwood: bass
- Spencer James Cobrin: drums

== Reception ==
In a review for AllMusic, Ned Raggett described the title track as "one of Morrissey's most curious songs; the music is okay enough, though his band can and have done better, but the lyric is about a window cleaner, of all things." Raggett preferred the B-sides, especially The Edges Are No Longer Parallel, "one of his all-time best songs."
