= Maladjusted =

1997 studio album by Morrissey

Studio album by Morrissey
- Released: 11 August 1997
- Recorded: January 1997
- Studios: Hook End Manor (Oxfordshire, England)
- Genres: Alternative rock; indie pop; pop rock
- Length: 42:54
- Label: Island
- Producer: Steve Lillywhite

Morrissey chronology
Southpaw Grammar (1995)	Maladjusted (1997)	Suedehead: The Best of Morrissey (1997)

2009 re-release cover

Singles from Maladjusted
- 1. "Alma Matters" Released: 21 July 1997; 2. "Roy's Keen" Released: 6 October 1997; 3. "Satan Rejected My Soul" Released: 29 December 1997

Maladjusted is the sixth studio album by the English singer Morrissey, released on 11 August 1997 by Island Records.

On release, the album received a lukewarm reception from fans and critics alike, and was Morrissey's last studio album for seven years, until 2004's You Are the Quarry.

== Content ==
Maladjusted was Morrissey's attempt to integrate the torch songs that he experimented with on Vauxhall and I with the indie rock of his earlier career. In addition to "Alma Matters", the tracks "Trouble Loves Me", "Ammunition" and "Wide to Receive" stand out as reminiscent of the Vauxhall and I era.

The album caused a small amount of controversy over what was to be the penultimate track. Entitled "Sorrow Will Come in the End", it featured Morrissey intoning, rather than singing, over a backing of manic strings and the beat of a judge's gavel. The song is clearly about the Mike Joyce royalties dispute, and lyrically takes the form of, essentially, an extended threatening message to him and his representatives. "Don't close your eyes/Don't ever close your eyes/A man who slits throats/Has time on his hands/And I'm gonna get you". Island Records, Morrissey's label at the time, dropped the track from UK versions of the album for fear of libel action. Joyce, for his part, said of the song, "I just found it funny. If Lemmy had written it, I might be concerned."

On the inside sleeve of the LP is printed "John Bindon 1943–1993", a reference to the English actor and bodyguard who had close links with the London underworld.

== Release ==
Morrissey released "Alma Matters" on 21 July 1997 to support the album. The song premiered on the KROQ-FM Jed the Fish show on 4 July 1997.

Maladjusted was released on 11 August 1997 by record label Island. The follow-up singles "Roy's Keen" and "Satan Rejected My Soul" peaked at numbers 42 and 39, respectively.

Island Records released a remastered and redesigned version of Maladjusted on 4 May 2009. It included a new album cover and track listing, several rare B-sides and the first UK release of "Sorrow Will Come in the End". However, two songs ("Roy's Keen" and "Papa Jack") were left off the new track list. In the initial press release, "Ambitious Outsiders" was incorrectly listed as "Ambitious Lovers". It was released on the Polydor label.

== Critical reception ==
Professional ratings
Review scores
Source	Rating
AllMusic	3/5 stars
Chicago Tribune	2/4 stars
Entertainment Weekly	C
The Guardian	2/5 stars
Los Angeles Times	2.5/4 stars
NME	6/10
Q	2/5 stars
Rolling Stone	3.5/5 stars
Select	3/5
Spin	6/10

Maladjusted received a mixed-to-unfavourable response from critics.

Matt Hendrickson of Rolling Stone wrote, "despite his predictability, Maladjusted is Morrissey's strongest musical effort since his 1988 solo debut, Viva Hate."

== Track listing ==
All lyrics are written by Morrissey; all music is composed by Alain Whyte, except where noted.

No.	Title	Music	Length
1.	"Maladjusted"	Boorer	4:42
2.	"Alma Matters"		4:48
3.	"Ambitious Outsiders"		3:56
4.	"Trouble Loves Me"		4:40
5.	"Papa Jack"		4:33
6.	"Ammunition"	Boorer	3:38
7.	"Wide to Receive"	Cobrin	3:53
8.	"Roy's Keen"		3:36
9.	"He Cried"		3:21
10.	"Sorrow Will Come in the End" (not included on any UK release)		2:51
11.	"Satan Rejected My Soul"	Boorer	2:56

2009 reissue
No.	Title	Music	Length
1.	"Maladjusted"	Boorer	4:42
2.	"Ambitious Outsiders"		3:55
3.	"Trouble Loves Me"		4:39
4.	"Lost" (B-side from the "Roy's Keen" single)	Cobrin	3:54
5.	"He Cried"		3:20
6.	"Alma Matters"		4:47
7.	"Heir Apparent" (B-side from the "Alma Matters" single)		3:56
8.	"Ammunition"	Boorer	3:38
9.	"The Edges Are No Longer Parallel" (B-side from the "Roy's Keen" single)		5:04
10.	"This Is Not Your Country" (B-side from the "Satan Rejected My Soul" single)		7:24
11.	"Wide to Receive"	Cobrin	3:53
12.	"I Can Have Both" (B-side from the "Alma Matters" single)	Boorer	4:05
13.	"Now I Am a Was" (B-side from the "Satan Rejected My Soul" single)	Cobrin	2:35
14.	"Satan Rejected My Soul"	Boorer	2:55
15.	"Sorrow Will Come in the End"		2:54

== Personnel ==
Credits are adapted from the Maladjusted liner notes.

- Morrissey – vocals
- Alain Whyte – guitar; piano; backing vocals
- Boz Boorer – clarinet, guitar
- Jonny Bridgwood – bass guitar
- Spencer Cobrin – drums
- Steve Lillywhite – producer

== Charts ==
1997 chart performance for Maladjusted
Chart (1997)	Peak position
Australian Albums (ARIA)	62
Canada Top Albums/CDs (RPM)	70
French Albums (SNEP)	27
German Albums (Offizielle Top 100)	76
Swedish Albums (Sverigetopplistan)	10
UK Albums (Official Charts)	8
US Billboard 200	61

2009 chart performance for Maladjusted
Chart (2009)	Peak position
Irish Albums (IRMA)	97
