= Alma Matters =

Single by Morrissey

from the album Maladjusted
- B-side: "Heir Apparent"; "I Can Have Both"
- Released: 21 July 1997
- Genre: Alternative rock
- Length: 4:48
- Label: Island (UK)
- Songwriters: Morrissey, Alain Whyte
- Producer: Steve Lillywhite

Morrissey singles chronology
"Sunny" (1995)	"Alma Matters" (1997)	"Roy's Keen" (1997)

Professional ratings
Review scores
Source	Rating
AllMusic	2/5 stars

"Alma Matters" is a song by Morrissey, released in July 1997 as the first single from the Maladjusted album. It was released one week before the album.

The single reached number 16 on the UK Singles Chart, becoming Morrissey's first top 20 hit since "The More You Ignore Me, the Closer I Get" in 1994. The song was also notable for seeing Morrissey reference the film A Taste of Honey (1961) for the first time since his early days in the Smiths in the line "it's my life to ruin my own way".

The song title is a pun on alma mater.

== Track listings ==
=== 7-inch vinyl and cassette (UK) ===
1. "Alma Matters" (Morrissey/Alain Whyte)
2. "Heir Apparent" (Morrissey/Whyte)

=== 12-inch vinyl and CD ===
1. "Alma Matters"
2. "Heir Apparent"
3. "I Can Have Both" (Morrissey/Boz Boorer)

Country	Record label	Format	Catalogue number
UK	Island	7-inch vinyl	IS667
UK	Island	12-inch vinyl	12IS667
UK	Island	Compact disc	CID667
UK	Island	Cassette	CIS667

== Reviews ==
Jack Rabid of AllMusic called this single "ho-hum", saying it was "a poor choice to represent Maladjusted". He also criticized guitarists Boz Boorer and Alain Whyte, asking when Morrissey was going to part company with them, and declared the B-sides "Heir Apparent" and "I Can Have Both" to be the better songs but still lacking in comparison to previous B-sides "Whatever Happens, I Love You" and "Nobody Loves Us". Rabid concludes his review, writing "Morrissey is a major talent with a special voice atrophying in underwhelming material and backing. To quote Joy Division, 'When will it end?'" NME's John Robinson wrote that it "confuses wordplay for songwriting". Keith Phipps of The A.V. Club, however, listed the song as a highlight of Maladjusted.

In a 2009 article Uncut described the song as 'Morrissey's worst single'.

Spin's list of '50 Best Morrissey Songs' from 2017 includes "Alma Matters" as his 12th best solo song.

== Personnel ==
- Morrissey – voice
- Martin "Boz" Boorer – guitar
- Alain Whyte – guitar
- Jonny Bridgwood – bass
- Spencer James Cobrin – drums

== Charts ==
Chart performance for "Alma Matters"
Chart (1997)	Peak position
Australia (ARIA)	97
Sweden (Sverigetopplistan)	50
UK Singles (Official Charts)	16
