= Swords (album) =

Compilation album by Morrissey
- Released: 26 October 2009
- Recorded: 2003–2007
- Genre: Alternative rock
- Length: 66:50
- Label: Polydor
- Producer: Tony Visconti; Gustavo Santaolalla; Jerry Finn

Morrissey chronology
Years of Refusal (2009)	Swords (2009)	Very Best of Morrissey (2011)

Professional ratings
Review scores
Source	Rating
AllMusic	2/5 stars
BBC	Mixed link
Billboard	Positive
Drowned in Sound	7/10 link
MusicOMH	link
Pitchfork	5.0/10 link
PopMatters	7/10 stars
Slant Magazine	link
Uncut	link

Swords is a compilation album by the English singer Morrissey, released in the UK on 26 October 2009 and in the US on 3 November on Polydor. The album features 18 previously non-album single B-sides collected from the sessions that also produced the preceding three Morrissey studio albums – You Are the Quarry (2004), Ringleader of the Tormentors (2006), and Years of Refusal (2009). Morrissey issued a total of 24 studio B-sides during 2004–2009, as well as numerous live B-side tracks, making Swords an incomplete collection of his non-album work of the era. However, in his review of the album, Stephen Thomas Erlewine of AllMusic notes that "Not all the flipsides are here, but all the noteworthy ones are."

Initial copies of the CD included a bonus disc of eight songs recorded live in Warsaw during Morrissey's 2009 tour. The compilation was supported by the Swords Tour, featuring dates in the UK, the Netherlands, France, Germany, Ireland, and the United States.

In a statement, Morrissey revealed that he had intended Swords to be a budget album, and was disappointed to see it be retailed for such a high price.

== Track listing ==
No.	Title	Writer(s)	Length
1.	"Good Looking Man About Town"	Morrissey/Alain Whyte	2:53
2.	"Don't Make Fun of Daddy's Voice"	Morrissey/Whyte	2:53
3.	"If You Don't Like Me, Don't Look at Me"	Morrissey/Jesse Tobias	3:40
4.	"Ganglord"	Morrissey/Whyte	5:18
5.	"My Dearest Love"	Morrissey/Whyte	4:00
6.	"The Never-Played Symphonies"	Morrissey/Whyte	3:03
7.	"Sweetie-Pie"	Morrissey/Michael Farrell	4:23
8.	"Christian Dior"	Morrissey/Boz Boorer	3:59
9.	"Shame Is the Name"	Morrissey/Whyte	3:49
10.	"Munich Air Disaster 1958"	Morrissey/Whyte	2:30
11.	"I Knew I Was Next"	Morrissey/Tobias	3:46
12.	"It's Hard to Walk Tall When You're Small"	Morrissey/Whyte	3:32
13.	"Teenage Dad on His Estate"	Morrissey/Whyte	4:08
14.	"Children in Pieces"	Morrissey/Tobias	4:01
15.	"Friday Mourning"	Morrissey/Whyte	4:08
16.	"My Life Is a Succession of People Saying Goodbye"	Morrissey/Whyte	2:53
17.	"Drive-In Saturday" (live at the Orpheum Theater, Nebraska in 2007)	David Bowie	5:05
18.	"Because of My Poor Education"	Morrissey/Whyte	2:56
Total length:			66:50

Live in Warsaw bonus disc
No.	Title	Writer(s)	Length
1.	"Black Cloud"	Morrissey/Boorer	3:08
2.	"I'm Throwing My Arms Around Paris"	Morrissey/Boorer	2:36
3.	"I Just Want to See the Boy Happy"	Morrissey/Tobias	2:50
4.	"Why Don't You Find Out for Yourself"	Morrissey/Whyte	3:37
5.	"One Day Goodbye Will Be Farewell"	Morrissey/Boorer	3:04
6.	"You Just Haven't Earned it Yet, Baby"	Morrissey/Johnny Marr	3:13
7.	"Life Is a Pigsty"	Morrissey/Whyte	8:56
8.	"I'm OK by Myself"	Morrissey/Tobias	6:03
Total length:			33:27

== Personnel ==
=== The band ===
- Morrissey – vocalist
- Alain Whyte – guitarist (tracks 1, 2, 3, 4, 6, 8, 10, 11, 12, 13, 15 and 16)
- Boz Boorer – guitarist
- Jesse Tobias – guitarist (tracks 1, 3, 4, 5, 8, 9, 11, 14, 17 and 18)
- Gary Day – bassist (tracks 1, 2, 3, 4, 6, 8, 10, 11, 12, 13, 15 and 16)
- Solomon Walker – bassist (tracks 5, 9, 14, 17 and 18)
- Matt Walker – drummer (tracks 5, 9, 14, 17 and 18)
- Dean Butterworth – drummer (tracks 2, 6, 10, 12, 13, 15 and 16)
- Matt Chamberlain – drummer (tracks 1 and 11)
- Michael Farrell – keyboards (tracks 1, 3, 4, 5, 7, 8, 11, 14 and 17)
- Roger Joseph Manning Jr. – keyboards (tracks 2, 6, 9, 10, 12, 13, 15, 16 and 18)

=== Additional credits ===
- Kristeen Young – additional vocals (track 7)
- Chrissie Hynde – backing vocals (track 9)
- Jerry Finn – producer (tracks 2, 5, 6, 9, 10 and 12–18)
- Tony Visconti – producer (tracks 1, 3, 4, 7, 8 and 11)
- Gustavo Santaolalla – producer (tracks 5 and 14)
