= Morrissey: Live at the Hollywood Bowl =

Live at the Hollywood Bowl

Video by Morrissey
- Released: 2009
- Recorded: June 8, 2007
- Genre: Alternative rock
- Length: 101 minutes
- Label: Warner Music Entertainment

Morrissey chronology
Who Put the M in Manchester? (2005)	Live at the Hollywood Bowl (2009)	Morrissey: 25 Live (2013)

Morrissey: Live at the Hollywood Bowl was announced as a DVD documenting a live performance by Morrissey, but has never been released. The concert took place at the historic Hollywood Bowl in Los Angeles, CA, on June 8, 2007 on the first leg of Morrissey's 2007/2008 'Greatest Hits' tour. An abbreviated audio selection of this concert also appears on the 2 disc version of Morrissey's 2008 Greatest Hits CD, and a further audio track from the recording was released on the 2010 re-release of the single "Everyday Is Like Sunday".

On August 14, 2008, Morrissey released the following statement:

The slapdash release of Morrissey: Live at the Hollywood Bowl is done by Warner without any consultation to me whatsoever, and is in breach of their terms as laid out by themselves in an agreement made for the film between Warner and my ex-manager. Being Warner, predictably the sleeve art is appalling. It is the work of cash-hounds, and I urge people NOT to buy it. I am not signed to Warner, and no royalties from this DVD will come to me. Please spend your money elsewhere. Thank you, MORRISSEY.

Though originally scheduled for October 6, 2008, the release date for the DVD was delayed until March 1, 2009. However, according to HMV and Amazon.com, the DVD has been canceled. There has been no word from Warner Music or Morrissey concerning the delay of the DVD or its release.

== Track listing ==
1. "The Queen Is Dead"
2. "The Last of the Famous International Playboys"
3. "Ganglord"
4. "The National Front Disco"
5. "Let Me Kiss You"
6. "All You Need Is Me"
7. "The Boy with the Thorn in His Side"
8. "Irish Blood, English Heart"
9. "Disappointed"
10. "I've Changed My Plea to Guilty"
11. "Everyday Is Like Sunday"
12. "In the Future When All's Well"
13. "I Will See You in Far-Off Places"
14. "Girlfriend in a Coma"
15. "First of the Gang to Die"
16. "I Just Want to See the Boy Happy"
17. "You Have Killed Me"
18. "That's How People Grow Up"
19. "Life Is a Pigsty"
20. "How Soon Is Now?"
21. "Please, Please, Please Let Me Get What I Want"
22. "You're Gonna Need Someone on Your Side"
23. "There Is a Light That Never Goes Out"
