= Merck Mercuriadis =

Canadian-American music industry executive

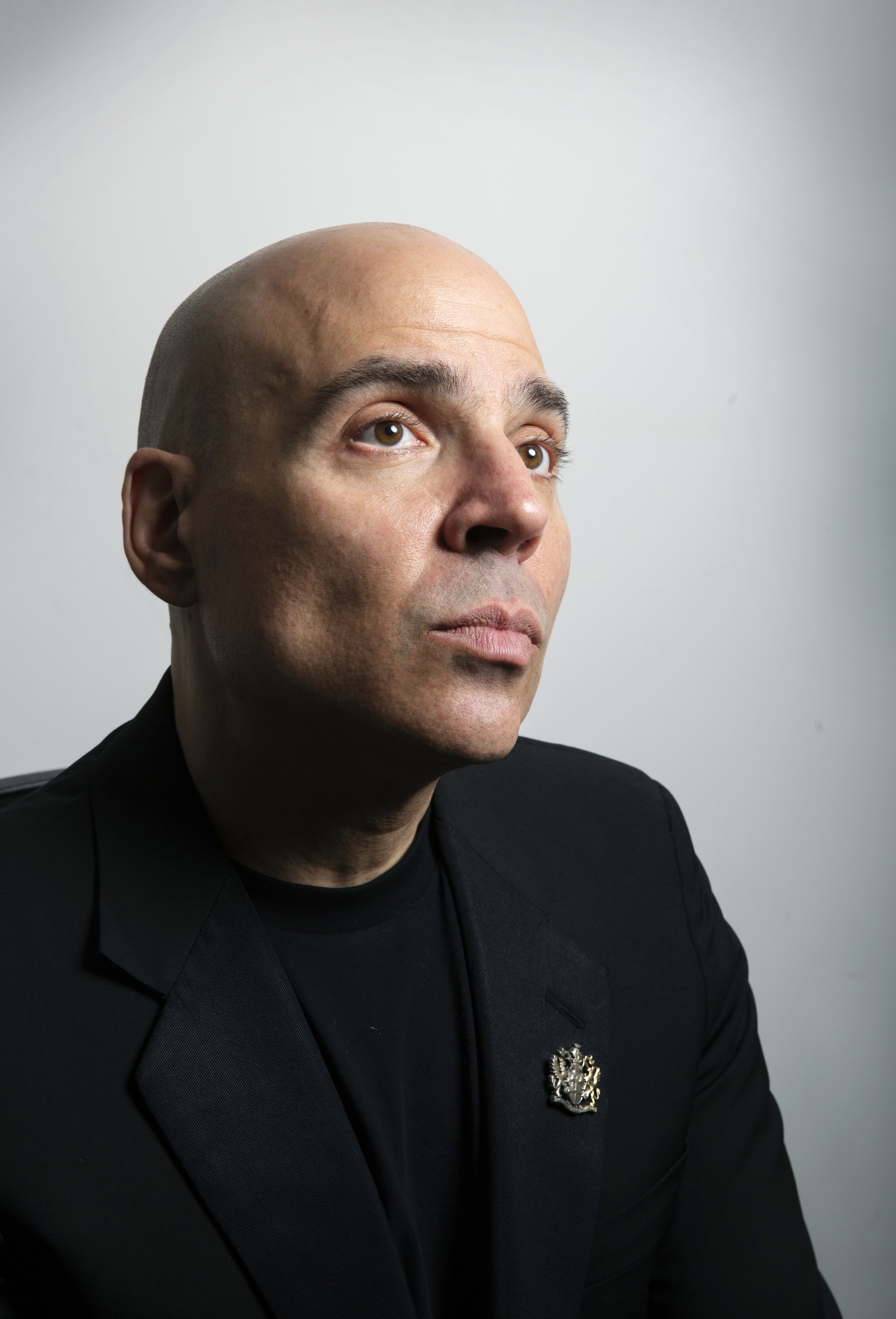
- Born: October 2, 1963 (age 62); Schefferville, Quebec, Canada
- Occupations: Music industry executive; artist manager; entrepreneur
- Years active: 1983–present
- Title: CEO and founder, Hipgnosis Song Management; founder, Hipgnosis Songs Fund; founder, Hipgnosis Songs Capitol (in partnership with Blackstone)
- Board member of: We Are Family Foundation
- Awards: Variety 500 (2020, 2021,2022); Billboard Power 100 (2020-2023); Honorary professorship, Royal Northern College of Music (2020); Rolling Stone Future 25, 2020

Merck Mercuriadis (born October 2, 1963) is a British-Canadian music industry executive, artist manager, and entrepreneur. He is the founder and chairman of Hipgnosis Song Management; the founder of Recognition Music Group; and the founder of Hipgnosis Songs Capital (in partnership with Blackstone).

Mercuriadis has managed artists including Nile Rodgers, Beyoncé, Elton John, Guns N' Roses, Iron Maiden, Morrissey, Pet Shop Boys, Macy Gray, Mary J. Blige, Joss Stone, Jane's Addiction, and Catherine Wheel. He was the director and CEO of Sanctuary Group PLC from 1986 to 2007.

== Early life ==
Mercuriadis was born to Greek immigrant parents in Schefferville, Quebec, Canada. His family moved to Middleton, Nova Scotia where he attended local public schools. At the age of 12, he traveled 100 mi (160 km) from his home town to see Kiss play in Halifax. The concert inspired him to pursue a career in the music industry.

== Career ==
=== Virgin, Sanctuary Group ===
At 19 after bombarding his favorite label, Virgin Records, with letters Mercuriadis was hired as a marketing director at Virgin Canada. With Virgin thriving, he moved to the UK office, where his position was expanded to include A&R. In addition to working on records by UB40, The Human League and XTC, Mercuriadis was involved with signing Mary Margaret O'Hara. Her debut album, Miss America was released five years after she was signed, and although the album was praised, Mercuriadis found the process of representing the label, rather than the artist, difficult. Realizing that his passion was for musicians—not labels—he left Virgin shortly after the record's release.

In October 1986, Mercuriadis joined Rod Smallwood and Andy Taylor, the founders, at Sanctuary Music (Overseas) Limited, a management company based in the United Kingdom. Over his 20 year tenure, the Sanctuary Group PLC expanded to encompass Sanctuary Artist Management, Sanctuary Records Group Limited, Rough Trade Records, Helter Skelter Agency and Bravado Merchandise, Twenty First Artists and Trinifold Management. In 2000, Mercuriadis moved from London to New York to build the North American company. In addition Mercuriadis and Sanctuary Group relaunched Rough Trade Records with founder Geoff Travis and Jeannette Lee in 2001. RTR included several artists such as The Strokes, The Moldy Peaches, The Libertines, Arcade Fire, Antony and the Johnsons, and The Kills. In New York Mercuriadis was chief executive officer of Sanctuary Group North America until December 2004. Sanctuary reorganized its management team and named Mercuriadis CEO of the entire group for his substantial contribution in the global revenues overseas.

During his tenure at Sanctuary Group, Mercuriadis oversaw the management of Destiny's Child, Beyoncé, Nelly, Mick Fleetwood, Tommy Lee, The Who, and Robert Plant. He also managed the recordings of Megadeth, Kiss, Gene Simmons, Paul Stanley, Lynyrd Skynyrd, The Allman Brothers Band, Earth, Wind & Fire, The Blue Nile, Simple Minds and Lou Reed. He was recognized for his creative marketing strategies, contributing to the success of Morrisey's Ringleader of the Tormentors—a #1 album—and You Are the Quarry, which hit #2. He worked on the #1 success of "Changes" with Ozzy and Kelly Osbourne, "Elton John's Electricity", Antony and the Johnsons' Mercury Music Prize-winning I Am a Bird Now, and several #1 Iron Maiden albums.

In 2005, Mercuriadis was featured on the cover of Billboard magazine with Elton John. He delivered the keynote speech at the Pollstar CIC awards in 2005. In a 2017 article published by Music Business International Mercuriadis wrote: "Our job as managers isn’t to do what we want to do, it’s to do what the artist wants to do. Our job is to facilitate their vision for themselves and to help bring it to fruition."

Mercuriadis resigned from Sanctuary Music Group on October 31, 2006. He continued to manage Guns N' Roses and Morrissey. He worked with Guns N' Roses over several years, during which their much-anticipated and much-delayed album, Chinese Democracy, was released. He also oversaw Morrissey albums including You Are the Quarry, First of the Gang to Die, Ringleader of the Tormentors, and Greatest Hits. His work with Morrissey resulted in ten top 20 singles.

=== Hipgnosis Songs Fund ===
Mercuriadis is the founder of Hipgnosis Songs Fund Limited, a music IP investment company. In a 2019 interview with the journal Thought Economics, he said: "I have always believed that hit songs and music, art in general, has real value to it. What people don’t really recognise is that when a song becomes a proven song, the earnings pattern to it becomes very predictable and reliable, and is therefore investable. And these songs are as valuable as gold, or oil." He later said "In the music business, without the song we don’t exist – it’s the energy that makes the world go round."

The company raised more than US$300 million to fund the acquisition of copyrights in June 2018, and began trading on the London Stock Exchange as SONG in July. Its first acquisition was a majority stake in The-Dream's 302-song catalogue, which included hits such as Justin Bieber's "Baby", Beyonce's "Single Ladies (Put a Ring on It)" and Rihanna's "Umbrella." At the close of its first full year as a publicly traded company, its catalogue totaled more than 5,000 songs; of those, approximately 2,000 had been #1 hits somewhere in the world, and 4,000 had reached the Top 10. Five songs co-owned by Hipgnosis Songs Fund appeared in the Top 10 on the Billboard Hot 100 of the decade chart.

In October 2021, the Blackstone Group announced a partnership with Hipgnosis Song Management backed by an initial $1 billion in funds managed by Blackstone. It also acquired an ownership stake in Hipgnosis Song Management. In 2022, among other acquisitions, Hipgnosis Song Management acquired 100% of the Justin Timberlake catalogue, 80% of Kenny Chesney's catalogue, and all of the 278 songs written by Leonard Cohen. As of July 2022, Hipgnosis Songs Fund owned 65,000 songs with a fair value of $2.7 billion. In January 2023, Hipgnosis Songs Management acquired Justin Bieber's entire back catalog of more than 290 songs.

Hipgnosis Songs Fund submitted written evidence for the Department for Digital, Culture, Media and Sport's December 2020 inquiry into the economics of streaming. In an interview with Music Week, Mercuriadis stated: “Once they peel away the layers of that onion, what they’re going to get into is investigating the business practices of the major labels and the publishing companies that they own and control. The reason songwriters are not being paid what they should be getting paid is that the three biggest publishing companies are not advocating for songwriters, because they’re owned by the three biggest recorded music companies in the world.”
