= List of Official Vinyl Singles Chart number ones of the 2010s =

The Official Vinyl Singles Chart is a weekly record chart compiled by the Official Charts Company (OCC) on behalf of the music industry in the United Kingdom since April 2015. It lists the 40 most popular singles in the gramophone record (or "vinyl") format. This is a list of the singles which reached number one on the Official Vinyl Singles Chart in the 2010s.

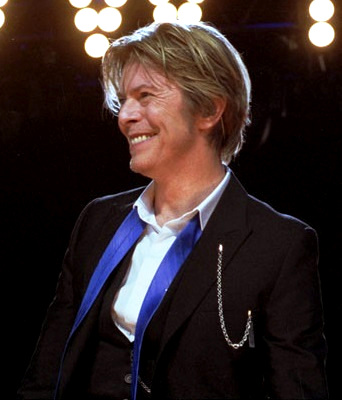
David Bowie holds the record for the most number-one singles during the decade

== Number ones ==
Key
No.	nth single to top the Official Vinyl Singles Chart
re	Return of a single to number one
†	Best-selling vinyl single of the year

No.	Artist (Note: The artist, single, date of reaching number one and number of weeks at number one are those given by the OCC.)	Single	Record label (Note: The record labels are those given by the OCC.)	Reached number one (for the week ending)	Weeks at number one	Ref.
2015
1	Underworld vs. Heller & Farley	"Baby Wants to Ride"	Smith Hyde Productions	18 April 2015	1	
2	David Bowie	"Changes"	Rhino	25 April 2015	2	
3	Blur	"Y'all Doomed"	Parlophone	9 May 2015	1	
4	Ryan Adams	"I Do Not Like Being Good"	Pax Am	16 May 2015	1	
5	Noel Gallagher's High Flying Birds	"Riverman"	Sour Mash	23 May 2015	1	
6	The Vaccines	"Dream Lover"	Columbia	30 May 2015	1	
re	Noel Gallagher's High Flying Birds	"Riverman"	Sour Mash	6 June 2015	1	
7	The Strypes	"Scumbag City"	EMI	13 June 2015	1	
8	Rat Boy	"Sign On"	Hometown	20 June 2015	1	
9	Sarah Cracknell & Nicky Wire	"Nothing Left to Talk About"	Cherry Red	27 June 2015	1	
10	Ryan Adams	"Burn In the Night"	Pax Am	4 July 2015	1	
11	Twilight Sad	"It Never Was the Same"	Fat Cat	11 July 2015	1	
12	David Hasselhoff	"True Survivor"	Virgin	18 July 2015	1	
13	The Rolling Stones	"(I Can't Get No) Satisfaction"	ABKCO	25 July 2015	2	
14	Paul Weller	"Going My Way"	Parlophone	6 August 2015	1	
15	David Bowie	"Fame"	Colombia	13 August 2015	1	
16	Goat	"It's Time For Fun"	Rocket	20 August 2015	1	
17	Mike Garry & Joe Duddell	"St Anthony (An Ode To Anthony H Wilson)"	Skinny Dog	27 August 2015	1	
18	Disturbed	"The Vengeful One"	Reprise	3 September 2015	1	
19	Noel Gallagher's High Flying Birds	"Lock All the Doors"	Sour Mash	10 September 2015	1	
20	Slaves	"Sockets"	EMI	17 September 2015	1	
21	Bring Me the Horizon	"Happy Song"	RCA	24 September 2015	2	
22	Arcade Fire	"Get Right"	Sonovox	8 October 2015	1	
23	David Bowie	"Space Oddity"	EMI	15 October 2015	1	
24	Paul Weller	"I'm Where I Should Be"	Parlophone	22 October 2015	1	
re	David Bowie	"Space Oddity"	EMI	29 October 2015	1	
25	Elvis Presley	"If I Can Dream"	RCA	5 November 2015	1	
26	Wolf Alice	"You're A Germ"	Dirty Hit	12 November 2015	1	
27	Bob Dylan	"Like a Rolling Stone"	Columbia	19 November 2015	1	
28	David Bowie	"Golden Years"	Parlophone	26 November 2015	2	
29	Queen	"Bohemian Rhapsody"	Island	10 December 2015	1	
30	Kurt Cobain	"And I Love Her"	UMC	17 December 2015	1	
31	Noel Gallagher's High Flying Birds	"The Dying of the Light" †	Sour Mash	24 December 2015	1	
32	Blossoms	"Charlemagne"	EMI	31 December 2015	1	
2016
33	The Coral	"Chasing the Tail of a Dream"	Ignition	7 January 2016	1	
34	Paul Weller	"Pick It Up"	Parlophone	14 January 2016	1	
re	David Bowie	"Space Oddity"	EMI	21 January 2016	2	
re	David Bowie	"Golden Years"	Parlophone	4 February 2016	3	
35	Waco	"Wrangler"	Banquet	19 February 2016	1	
36	Mastodon	"White Walker"	Reprise	26 February 2016	1	
37	Blossoms	"At Most a Kiss"	EMI	4 March 2016	1	
38	Massive Attack featuring Azekel	"Ritual Spirit"	Virgin	11 March 2016	1	
39	The 1975	"A Change of Heart"	Dirty Hit/Polydor	18 March 2016	2	
40	New Order	"Singularity"	Mute	2 April 2016	1	
41	Spitfires	"So Long"	Catch 22	9 April 2016	1	
42	Caroline Gilmour	"Electric Waterfalls"	Caroline Gilmour	16 April 2016	1	
43	David Bowie	"TVC 15"	Parlophone	23 April 2016	1	
44	Muse	"Reapers"	Helium 3/Warner Bros.	30 April 2016	1	
45	Jeff Buckley	"The Boy with the Thorn in His Side"	Columbia/Legacy	7 May 2016	2	
46	Radiohead	"Burn the Witch"	XL	21 May 2016	1	
47	Charli XCX	"Vroom Vroom"	Vroom Vroom	28 May 2016	1	
48	Pet Shop Boys	"The Pop Kids"	X2	3 June 2016	1	
49	The Strokes	"Oblivious"	Cult	10 June 2016	1	
50	The Beach Boys	"God Only Knows"	Capitol	17 June 2016	1	
51	Kylie Minogue & Dannii Minogue	"100 Degrees"	Parlophone	24 June 2016	1	
52	Blossoms	"Getaway"	EMI	1 July 2016	1	
53	The Stone Roses	"All for One" †	EMI	8 July 2016	1	
54	Biffy Clyro	"Wolves of Winter"	14th Floor	15 July 2016	1	
re	The Stone Roses	"All for One" †	EMI	22 July 2016	1	
55	The Stone Roses	"Beautiful Thing"	EMI	29 July 2016	1	
56	Zomby & Burial	"Sweetz"	Hyperdub	5 August 2016	1	
57	Brand New	"I Am a Nightmare"	Procrastinate Music Traitors	12 August 2016	1	
58	Lonely the Brave	"Dust & Bones"	Hassle	19 August 2016	1	
59	David Brent	"Lady Gypsy"	Lotr Films	26 August 2016	1	
60	New Model Army	"Devil"	Attack Attack	2 September 2016	1	
re	David Brent	"Lady Gypsy"	Lotr Films	9 September 2016	1	
61	Twin Atlantic	"No Sleep"	Red Bull	16 September 2016	1	
62	Deap Vally	"Smile More"	Cooking Vinyl	23 September 2016	1	
63	Pet Shop Boys	"Say It To Me"	X2	30 September 2016	1	
64	Milburn	"Midnight Control"	Vam	7 October 2016	1	
65	Jamie T	"Power Over Men"	Virgin	14 October 2016	1	
66	Oasis	"Stand By Me"	Big Brother	21 October 2016	2	
67	Lucy Spraggan	"Dear You"	Ctrl	5 November 2016	1	
68	Massive Attack	"The Spoils"	Virgin	12 November 2016	1	
re	Oasis	"Stand By Me"	Big Brother	19 November 2016	1	
69	The Prodigy	"The Day Is My Enemy"	Take Me To The Hospital	26 November 2016	1	
70	The Rolling Stones	"Ride 'Em on Down"	Polydor	2 December 2016	2	
71	The XX	"On Hold"	Young Turks	16 December 2016	1	
72	Luci Baines Band	"Find a Lil Love"	Walk Tall	23 December 2016	1	
73	George Michael	"Freedom! '90"	Epic	30 December 2016	2	
2017
74	The Sherlocks	"Will You Be There"	Infectious	13 January 2017	1	
75	Jamie T	"Tescoland"	Virgin	20 January 2017	1	
76	The 1975	"Medicine"	Dirty Hit	27 January 2017	1	
77	The Buzzcocks	"Spiral Scratch"	Parlophone	3 February 2017	1	
78	Cigarettes After Sex	"Nothing's Gonna Hurt You Baby"	Spanish Prayers	10 February 2017	1	
79	David Bowie	"Sound and Vision"	Parlophone	17 February 2017	3	
80	FKA Twigs	"Weak Spot"	Young Turks	10 March 2017	1	
81	London Grammar	"Big Picture"	Ministry of Sound	17 March 2017	1	
82	HiFi Sean featuring Crystal Waters	"Testify"	Plastique	24 March 2017	1	
83	Blondie	"Long Time"	BMG	31 March 2017	1	
84	Enter Shikari	"Juggernauts"	Ambush Reality	7 April 2017	1	
85	The Sherlocks	"Was It Really Worth It"	Infectious	14 April 2017	1	
86	Black Honey	"Hello Today"	FoxFive	21 April 2017	1	
87	David Bowie	"No Plan" †	Columbia	28 April 2017	1	
88	Pink Floyd	"Interstellar Overdrive"	Rhino	5 May 2017	1	
89	Kasabian	"Comeback Kid"	Columbia	12 May 2017	1	
90	Stone Foundation/Paul Weller	"Back in the Game"	100%	19 May 2017	1	
re	David Bowie	"No Plan" †	Columbia	26 May 2017	1	
91	The Charlatans	"Plastic Machinery"	BMG	2 June 2017	1	
92	The 1975	"Somebody Else"	Dirty Hit/Polydor	9 June 2017	1	
93	Arcade Fire	"Everything Now"	Columbia	16 June 2017	1	
94	The Smiths	"The Queen Is Dead"	Rhino	23 June 2017	2	
95	Liam Gallagher	"Wall of Glass"	Warner Bros.	7 July 2017	2	
96	The Charlatans	"Different Days"	BMG	21 July 2017	1	
re	Liam Gallagher	"Wall of Glass"	Warner Bros.	28 July 2017	1	
97	Goldie presents Metalheadz	"Inner City Life"	MetalHeadz	4 August 2017	1	
98	The Doors	"Light My Fire"	Wea	11 August 2017	1	
99	Stone Foundation	"Simplify The Situation"	100%	18 August 2017	1	
100	O.M.D.	"Isotype"	100%	25 August 2017	1	
101	Paul Weller	"Woo Se Mama"	Parlophone	1 September 2017	1	
102	The Verve	"Bitter Sweet Symphony"	Hut	8 September 2017	1	
103	Saint Etienne	"Dive"	Heavenly	15 September 2017	1	
104	Margo Price	"Paper Cowboy"	Third Man	22 September 2017	1	
105	David Bowie	"Heroes"	EMI	29 September 2017	1	
106	Stone Foundation/Paul Weller	"Mother Ethiopia - Pt1"	Parlophone	6 October 2017	1	
107	Marillion	"Living in F E A R"	earMUSIC	13 October 2017	1	
re	David Bowie	"Heroes"	EMI	20 October 2017	1	
re	George Michael	"Freedom! '90"	Epic	27 October 2017	1	
108	Morrissey	"Spent the Day in Bed"	BMG	3 November 2017	1	
109	Roy Orbison	"Oh Pretty Woman"	Sony	10 November 2017	1	
110	Paul Weller	"One Tear"	Parlophone	17 November 2017	1	
111	Moonlandingz	"This Cities Undone"	Transgressive	24 November 2017	1	
112	Noel Gallagher's High Flying Birds	"Holy Mountain"	Sour Mash	1 December 2017	1	
113	Thunder	"Christmas Day"	earMUSIC	8 December 2017	1	
114	Morrissey	"Jacky's Only Happy When She's Up on the Stage"	BMG	15 December 2017	2	
115	The Charlatans	"Over Again"	BMG	29 December 2017	1	
2018
re	Morrissey	"Jacky's Only Happy When She's Up on the Stage"	BMG	5 January 2018	1	
116	David Bowie	"Beauty and the Beast"	Parlophone	12 January 2018	2	
117	Arcade Fire	"Put Your Money On Me"	Columbia	26 January 2018	1	
118	PVRIS	"Waking Up"	PVRIS	2 February 2018	1	
119	Beak	"Sex Music"	Invada	9 February 2018	1	
120	Factory Floor	"Heart of Data"	Heart of Data	16 February 2018	1	
121	Ride	"Pulsar"	Wichita	23 February 2018	1	
122	Jimi Hendrix	"Lover Man"	Legacy	2 March 2018	1	
123	The Kills	"List of Demands (Reparations)"	Domino	9 March 2018	1	
124	Noel Gallagher's High Flying Birds	"It's a Beautiful World" †	Sour Mash	16 March 2018	1	
125	Pale Waves	All the Things I Never Said	Dirty Hit	23 March 2018	1	
126	Morrissey	"My Love I'd Do Anything for You"	BMG	30 March 2018	2	
127	Kylie Minogue	"Dancing"	BMG	13 April 2018	1	
128	Manic Street Preachers	"International Blue"	Columbia	20 April 2018	1	
129	Led Zeppelin	"Rock and Roll"	Atlantic	27 April 2018	1	
re	Noel Gallagher's High Flying Birds	"It's a Beautiful World" †	Sour Mash	4 May 2018	1	
130	Wolf Alice	"Space & Time"	Dirty Hit	11 May 2018	1	
re	Led Zeppelin	"Rock and Roll"	Atlantic	18 May 2018	1	
131	James	"Better Than That"	Infectious	25 May 2018	1	
132	Noel Gallagher's High Flying Birds	"She Taught Me How to Fly"	Sour Mash	1 June 2018	1	
133	Mazzy Star	"Still"	Rhymes of An Hour	8 June 2018	1	
134	The Charlatans	"Totally Eclipsing"	BMG	15 June 2018	1	
135	Johnny Marr	"Hi Hello"	New Voodoo	22 June 2018	1	
136	Jungle	"Happy Man"	XL	29 June 2018	1	
137	George Ezra	"Shotgun"	Columbia	6 July 2018	1	
138	The Beatles	"Yellow Submarine"	Apple Corps	13 July 2018	2	
139	Calvin Harris & Dua Lipa	"One Kiss"	Columbia	27 July 2018	1	
140	Jamie Lenman	"Long Gone"	Big Scary Monsters	3 August 2018	1	
141	The Doors	"Hello, I Love You"	Wea	10 August 2018	1	
142	Face vs Mark Brown & Adam Shaw	"Needin' U"	CR2	17 August 2018	1	
143	The Coral	"Sweet Release"	Ignition	24 August 2018	1	
144	Sleep	"Leagues Beneath"	Third Man	31 August 2018	1	
145	Fortuna Pop All Stars	"You Can Hide Your Love Forever"	Fortuna Pop	7 September 2018	1	
146	David Bowie	"Zeroes"	Parlophone	14 September 2018	1	
147	First Aid Kit	"Tender Offerings"	Columbia	21 September 2018	1	
148	Noel Gallagher's High Flying Birds	"If Love is the Law"	Sour Mash	28 September 2018	1	
149	Dave Grohl	"Play"	Unknown RCH	5 October 2018	1	
150	Twenty One Pilots	"Jumpsuit"	Atlantic	12 October 2018	1	
151	Cliff Richard	"Rise Up"	Rhino	19 October 2018	1	
152	Nothing But Thieves	"Forever and Ever More"	RCA	26 October 2018	1	
153	Blondie	"Heart of Glass"	Chrysalis	2 November 2018	1	
154	Pip Blom	"Paycheck"	El Diablo	9 November 2018	1	
155	Gary Numan	"It Will End Here"	BMG	16 November 2018	1	
156	David Bowie	"Breaking Glass"	Parlophone	23 November 2018	1	
157	Morrissey	"Back on the Chain Gang"	BMG	30 November 2018	1	
158	Arctic Monkeys	"Tranquility Base Hotel & Casino"	Domino	7 December 2018	1	
159	Public Service Broadcasting	"White Star Liner"	Play It Again Sam	14 December 2018	2	
160	The Fontaines	"Too Real"	Partisan	28 December 2018	2	
2019
re	Public Service Broadcasting	"White Star Liner"	Play It Again Sam	10 January 2019	1	
161	Hozier featuring Mavis Staples	"Nina Cried Power"	Island	17 January 2019	1	
162	Ian Brown	"First World Problems"	EMI	24 January 2019	1	
163	Arctic Monkeys	"Leave Before the Lights Come On"	Domino	31 January 2019	1	
164	The Lurkers	"Electrical Guitar"	Damaged Goods	7 February 2019	1	
165	Sleeper	"Look At You Now"	Gorsky	14 February 2019	1	
re	The Fontaines	"Too Real"	Partisan	21 February 2019	1	
166	LCD Soundsystem	"Freakout Starry Eyes"	Parlophone	28 February 2019	1	
167	Mac Miller	"Spotify Singles"	Warner	7 March 2019	1	
168	The Chemical Brothers	"Free Yourself"	Virgin	14 March 2019	1	
169	New Order	"Ceremony"	Rhino	21 March 2019	1	
170	New Order	"Everything's Gone Green"	UMC	28 March 2019	1	
171	New Order	"Temptation"	Rhino	4 April 2019	1	
re	New Order	"Ceremony"	Rhino	11 April 2019	1	
172	The Murder Capital	"Feeling Fades"	Human Season	18 April 2019	1	
173	Idles	"Queens"	Bally	25 April 2019	1	
174	The Rebels and David Bowie	"Revolutionary Song"	Music on Vinyl	2 May 2019	1	
175	Sleeper	"The Sun Also Rises"	Gorsky	9 May 2019	1	
176	Stone Foundation	"Ordinary Joe"	100%	16 May 2019	1	
177	Morrissey	"Wedding Bell Blues"	BMG	23 May 2019	1	
178	David Bowie	"Boys Keep Swinging"	Parlophone	30 May 2019	1	
179	Kate Bush	"Cloudbusting"	Fish People	6 June 2019	2	
180	Liam Gallagher	"Shockwave"	Warner Bros.	20 June 2019	1	
181	ABBA	"Voulez Vous"	Polydor	27 June 2019	1	
re	Liam Gallagher	"Shockwave"	Warner Bros.	4 July 2019	1	
182	David Bowie	"DJ"	Parlophone	11 July 2019	1	
183	Primal Scream	"Velocity Girl"	Sony Music	18 July 2019	1	
184	Floating Points	"LesAlpx"	Ninja Tune	25 July 2019	1	
185	Slaves	"One More Day Won't Hurt"	EMI	1 August 2019	1	
186	Freddie Mercury	"Time Waits For No One"	Virgin	8 August 2019	1	
187	Blur	"Girls & Boys"	Food	15 August 2019	2	
188	Liam Gallagher	"One of Us"	Warner	29 August 2019	1	
189	New Model Army	"Never Arriving"	earMUSIC	5 September 2019	1	
190	Taylor Swift	"Teardrops on My Guitar"	Mercury	12 September 2019	1	
191	Singer	"High School Sweethearts"	Atlantic	19 September 2019	1	
192	Jarv Is	"Must I Evolve"	Rough Trade	26 September 2019	1	
193	Flyte	"White Roses"	Island	3 October 2019	1	
194	O.M.D.	"Electricity"	Virgin	10 October 2019	1	
195	The Sherlocks	"NYC (Sing it Loud)"	Infectious	17 October 2019	1	
196	Gerry Cinnamon	"Sun Queen"	Little Runaway	24 October 2019	1	
189	Liam Gallagher	"Now That I've Found You"	Warner	31 October 2019	1	
190	Pet Shop Boys featuring Years & Years	"Dreamland"	X2	7 November 2019	1	
191	A-ha	"Take On Me"	Wea	14 November 2019	1	
192	Kate Bush	"Ne T'en Fui Pas"	Parlophone	21 November 2019	1	
193	Squid	"Savage"	Speedy Wunderground	28 November 2019	1	
194	The Chemical Brothers	"Under the Influence"	Virgin	5 December 2019	1	
195	U2	"Out of Control"	Island	12 December 2019	1	
196	ABBA	"Happy New Year"	Polar	19 December 2019	1	
197	Wham!	"Last Christmas" †	RCA	26 December 2019	2	

=== By record label ===
19 record labels have topped the chart for at least three weeks.

Record label	Number-one singles	Weeks at number one
Parlophone	18	25
BMG	12	15
EMI	12	15
Columbia	12	14
Rhino	6	9
Sour Mash	7	9
Virgin	9	9
Warner Bros.	5	8
Dirty Hit	6	7
RCA	4	6
100%	4	4
Island	4	4
Big Brother	1	3
Epic	1	3
Play It Again Sam	1	3
Domino	3	3
Partisan	1	3
X2	3	3
Wea	3	3

=== By artist ===
18 artists topped the chart for at least three weeks.

Artist	Number-one singles	Weeks at number one
David Bowie	12	25
Noel Gallagher's High Flying Birds	7	9
Morrissey	5	8
The 1975	3	4
Paul Weller	7	7
Liam Gallagher	3	6
The Rolling Stones	2	4
The Charlatans	4	4
New Order	3	4
Stone Foundation	4	4
Arcade Fire	3	3
Blossoms	3	3
George Michael	1	3
The Fontaines	1	3
Oasis	1	3
Pet Shop Boys	3	3
Public Service Broadcasting	1	3
The Stone Roses	2	3
