= I'm Throwing My Arms Around Paris =

2009 single by Morrissey

Single by Morrissey

from the album Years of Refusal
- B-side: "Because of My Poor Education"; "Shame is the Name"; "Death of a Disco Dancer"
- Released: 9 February 2009
- Recorded: 2007
- Genre: Alternative rock; indie pop
- Length: 2:30
- Label: Decca
- Songwriters: Morrissey; Boz Boorer
- Producer: Jerry Finn

Morrissey singles chronology
"All You Need Is Me" (2008)	"I'm Throwing My Arms Around Paris" (2009)	"Something Is Squeezing My Skull" (2009)

"I'm Throwing My Arms Around Paris" is a song written by Morrissey along with Boz Boorer, the two being responsible for lyrics and music respectively. The song was the first single to be released from Morrissey's ninth studio album Years of Refusal (2009). It was recorded in Los Angeles and produced by Jerry Finn, the man behind 2004's You Are the Quarry. The single was released on 9 February 2009 and has reached No. 21 on the UK Singles Chart, and is his last single to reach the UK Top 40. In Scotland the song topped the Scottish Singles Chart, becoming Morrissey's second of three number one singles on that chart, although this was because the Scottish chart at that point only counted physical sales at a time when download sales had become dominant.

The song premiered on BBC Radio 2 on 22 December 2008 but made its live debut 17 July 2007 at the Morocco Shrine Auditorium in Jacksonville, Florida on the second leg of Morrissey's 2007/2008 'Greatest Hits Tour'. Morrissey often joked that the song was originally written to be his entry to the 2007 Eurovision song contest.

== Reception ==
Reviewing a pre-release copy of the single, Filter magazine said the song contained "Morrissey’s classic croon" and that they could not get enough of it.

In its first week of release "I'm Throwing My Arms Around Paris" reached number 21 on the UK Singles Chart as well as number one on the Scottish Singles Chart, giving Morrissey his second number-one single in that country, after "All You Need Is Me" in 2008. The song also charted in France at number 26 and Sweden at number 58.

In the United States, the song received somewhat limited exposure on alternative rock and triple A stations including WWCD, WEQX, Spectrum, and WXRV.

The single also received some pre-release attention for its artwork; the inside sleeve features an image of Morrissey and his bandmates posing entirely naked except for vinyl records covering their genitals.

== Track listing ==
CD1

1. "I'm Throwing My Arms Around Paris"
2. "Because of My Poor Education" (Morrissey/Whyte)

CD2

1. "I'm Throwing My Arms Around Paris"
2. "Shame Is the Name" (Morrissey/Whyte)

7"

1. "I'm Throwing My Arms Around Paris"
2. "Death of a Disco Dancer" (Live, Waukegan, 17 October 2007) (Morrissey/Marr)

== Personnel ==
- Morrissey – vocals
- Boz Boorer – guitar
- Jesse Tobias – guitar
- Solomon Walker – bass guitar
- Matt Walker – drums
- Roger Manning – keyboard
- Mark Isham – trumpet ("I'm Throwing My Arms Around Paris")
- Chrissie Hynde – backing vocals ("Shame Is the Name")
- Michael Farrell – keyboard ("Death of a Disco Dancer")

== Charts ==
Chart (2009)	Peak position
France (SNEP)	26
Scottish Singles Sales (Official Charts)	1
Sweden (Sverigetopplistan)	58
UK Singles (Official Charts)	21
