= Something Is Squeezing My Skull =

Single by Morrissey

from the album Years of Refusal
- Released: 27 April 2009
- Recorded: 2007
- Genre: Alternative rock; indie rock
- Length: 2:38
- Label: Decca
- Songwriters: Morrissey; Alain Whyte
- Producer: Jerry Finn

Morrissey singles chronology
"I'm Throwing My Arms Around Paris" (2009)	"Something Is Squeezing My Skull" (2009)	"Everyday Is Like Sunday" (2010)

Alternative covers
- Alternative cover

"Something Is Squeezing My Skull" is a song with lyrics by Morrissey and music by Alain Whyte. The song is the second single to be released from Morrissey's 2009 album Years of Refusal. It was recorded in Los Angeles and produced by Jerry Finn, the man behind 2004’s You Are the Quarry. The single was released on 27 April 2009 and reached number 46 on the UK Singles Chart, as well as number one on the Scottish Singles Chart, which at that point still only counted physical sales, becoming Morrissey's third and most recent number-one single on that chart. The song also experienced some success in France, where it reached number 35 on the SNEP chart.

The single comes backed with live recordings of "This Charming Man", "Best Friend on the Payroll" and "I Keep Mine Hidden", the latter being performed for the first time ever by Morrissey and his band at BBC Radio 2's 'Live With Morrissey' concert in February 2009.

The album art depicts Morrissey hugging Johnny Ramone's memorial statue at his grave in Hollywood Forever Cemetery.

== Track listing ==
CD1

1. "Something Is Squeezing My Skull"
2. "This Charming Man" (Live, BBC Radio Theatre Feb 2009) (Morrissey/Johnny Marr)

CD2

1. "Something Is Squeezing My Skull"
2. "Best Friend on the Payroll" (Live, BBC Radio Theatre Feb 2009) (Morrissey/Whyte)

7" single

1. "Something Is Squeezing My Skull"
2. "I Keep Mine Hidden" (Live, BBC Radio Theatre Feb 2009) (Morrissey/Marr)

== Personnel ==
- Morrissey – vocals
- Boz Boorer – guitar
- Jesse Tobias – guitar
- Solomon Walker – bass guitar
- Matt Walker – drums
- Roger Manning – keyboard
- Kristopher Pooley – keyboard (B-sides only)

== Charts ==
Chart (2009)	Peak position
France (SNEP)	35
Scottish Singles Sales (Official Charts)	1
UK Singles (Official Charts)	46
