= Greatest Hits (Morrissey album) =

Greatest hits album by Morrissey
- Released: 11 February 2008
- Recorded: 1987–2007
- Genre: Alternative rock
- Length: 51:01
- Labels: Polydor; Decca
- Producers: Jerry Finn; Tony Visconti; Stephen Street; Steve Lillywhite

Morrissey chronology
Ringleader of the Tormentors (2006)	Greatest Hits (2008)	Years of Refusal (2009)

Singles from Greatest Hits
- 1. "That's How People Grow Up" Released: 4 February 2008; 2. "All You Need Is Me" Released: 2 June 2008

Professional ratings
Review scores
Source	Rating
AllMusic	3/5 stars
Digital Spy	3/5 stars
NME	6/10 stars
Pitchfork	6.1/10

Greatest Hits is a compilation album by English singer Morrissey, released on 11 February 2008. Unlike 1997's greatest hits, Suedehead: The Best of Morrissey, this compilation predominantly features songs from the then previous two studio albums, You Are the Quarry and Ringleader of the Tormentors. The album also features two new songs, lead single "That's How People Grow Up" and "All You Need Is Me", both of which were later included on studio album Years of Refusal.

== Track listing ==
No.	Title	Writer(s)	Length
1.	"First of the Gang to Die" (from You Are the Quarry, 2004)	Morrissey, Alain Whyte	3:37
2.	"In the Future When All's Well" (from Ringleader of the Tormentors, 2006)	Morrissey, Jesse Tobias	3:52
3.	"I Just Want to See the Boy Happy" (from Ringleader of the Tormentors, 2006)	Morrissey, Tobias	2:56
4.	"Irish Blood, English Heart" (from You Are the Quarry, 2004)	Morrissey, Whyte	2:36
5.	"You Have Killed Me" (from Ringleader of the Tormentors, 2006)	Morrissey, Tobias	3:06
6.	"That's How People Grow Up" (single, 2008)	Morrissey, Boz Boorer	2:59
7.	"Everyday Is Like Sunday" (from Viva Hate, 1988)	Morrissey, Stephen Street	3:31
8.	"Redondo Beach" (from Live at Earls Court, 2005)	Patti Smith, Lenny Kaye, Richard Sohl	3:56
9.	"Suedehead" (from Viva Hate, 1988)	Morrissey, Street	3:49
10.	"The Youngest Was the Most Loved" (from Ringleader of the Tormentors, 2006)	Morrissey, Tobias	2:58
11.	"The Last of the Famous International Playboys" (Non-album single, 1989)	Morrissey, Street	3:36
12.	"The More You Ignore Me, the Closer I Get" (from Vauxhall and I, 1994)	Morrissey, Boorer	3:41
13.	"All You Need Is Me" (new track and single 2008)	Morrissey, Tobias	3:11
14.	"Let Me Kiss You" (from You Are the Quarry, 2004)	Morrissey, Whyte	3:30
15.	"I Have Forgiven Jesus" (from You Are the Quarry, 2004)	Morrissey, Whyte	3:43

=== Bonus live CD ===
Initial runs of the album were accompanied by a bonus CD of songs recorded live at the Hollywood Bowl on 8 June 2007. The international version features eight tracks, whereas the US version features "That's How People Grow Up" (written by Morrissey and Boorer, 3:05) as track 8, pushing "Life is a Pigsty" to track 9. All songs written by Morrissey and Alain Whyte, unless indicated otherwise.

Track listing:

1. "The Last of the Famous International Playboys" (Morrissey, Street) (3:51)
2. "The National Front Disco" (4:08)
3. "Let Me Kiss You" (4:28)
4. "Irish Blood, English Heart" (2:42)
5. "I Will See You in Far-Off Places" (4:16)
6. "First of the Gang to Die" (4:23)
7. "I Just Want to See the Boy Happy" (Morrissey, Tobias) (3:20)
8. "Life is a Pigsty" (9:15)

== Etchings ==
Given that the CD is a mock up of a vinyl record, the words WE ARE YOUR THOUGHTS appear on the runout grooves.
