= We Are Love (The Charlatans album) =

Studio album by the Charlatans
- Released: 31 October 2025
- Studios: Rockfield, Wales
- Length: 46:11
- Label: BMG
- Producers: Dev Hynes; Fred Macpherson; Stephen Street

The Charlatans chronology
Different Days (2017)	We Are Love (2025)

We Are Love is the fourteenth album by English band the Charlatans, released on 31 October 2025 through BMG Rights Management. The album's title track was released as the lead single on 14 July 2025. The album is their first to be recorded at Rockfield since 1997's Tellin' Stories.

== Background ==
Unlike the previous album, which boasted prolific collaborators, We Are Love was a more focused effort, with Tim Burgess telling the NME: "It felt like we couldn't have any more collaborators", however, Kevin Godley of 10CC appears on the album. The title track "came quite easy" to the band according to Burgess, who said of the title track: "[its] like an open-top car ride in the credits of your favorite movie, driving along the coast to somewhere amazing."

Among influences, the band shared 'hauntology' and 'psychogeography' as talking points whilst recording the album, partly influenced by the choice of going back to Rockfield according to frontman Tim Burgess, who further elaborated on the decision:

"That was important as a way of honoring every member who’s played in the band. So we're honouring ourselves, our past, feeling that energy and reincarnating it, doing something fresh, brand new."

== Track listing ==
All tracks are written by Martin Blunt, Tim Burgess, Mark Collins, and Tony Rogers.

No.	Title	Length
1.	"Kingdom of Ours"	4:13
2.	"We Are Love"	3:49
3.	"Many a Day a Heartache"	3:32
4.	"For the Girls"	4:53
5.	"You Can't Push the River"	3:49
6.	"Deeper and Deeper"	3:59
7.	"Appetite"	4:05
8.	"Salt Water"	1:48
9.	"Out on Our Own"	4:51
10.	"Glad You Grabbed Me"	4:25
11.	"Now Everything"	6:47
Total length:		46:11

== Personnel ==
Credits adapted from Tidal.

=== The Charlatans ===
- Martin Blunt – bass guitar
- Tim Burgess – vocals (all tracks), acoustic guitar (tracks 3, 4, 8)
- Mark Collins – guitar, backing vocals (all tracks); samples (8)
- Tony Rogers – keyboards, piano, backing vocals

=== Additional contributors ===
- Dev Hynes – production, synthesizer (1–4, 6–11); backing vocals (1–4, 6, 7, 10), guitar (2, 4, 7, 10), acoustic guitar (2, 6), piano (4, 7, 10), programming (7, 11), engineering (8), keyboards (9), samples (11)
- Fred Macpherson – production, backing vocals (1–4, 6–11); synthesizer (1–4, 6, 7, 9–11), programming (2, 3, 7, 10, 11), samples (3, 4, 6, 11), engineering (8)
- Matt Colton – engineering
- Pete Salisbury – drums, percussion
- Craig Silvey – engineering (1–7, 9–11)
- Evie Clark-Yospa – engineering (1–4, 6–11), backing vocals (8)
- Tim Lewis – engineering (1–4, 6, 7, 9–11)
- Digby Smith – synthesizer (1, 4, 11)
- Orlando Leopard – synthesizer (1, 4, 11)
- Tim Lewis – synthesizer (1, 7, 9, 10), samples (7)
- Stephen Street – production (5, 6)
- Robert Sellens – engineering (5, 6)
- Kevin Godley – backing vocals (9)
- Peter Gordon – tenor saxophone (10)

== Charts ==
Chart performance for We Are Love
Chart (2025)	Peak position
French Physical Albums (SNEP)	94
French Rock & Metal Albums (SNEP)	31
Scottish Albums (Official Charts)	2
UK Albums (Official Charts)	8
UK Independent Albums (Official Charts)	1
