= Big Deal Music =

Defunct American music publishing Company

- Type: Privately held company
- Industry: Music industry
- Founded: 2012
- Founders: Kenny MacPherson, Jamie Cerreta and Dave Ayers
- Defunct: 2020
- Fate: Acquired
- Successor: Hipgnosis Songs Fund
- Headquarters: Los Angeles, United States
- Area served: Worldwide
- Products: Music publishing

Big Deal Music was an American music publisher, founded in 2012 by former Chrysalis Music employees Kenny MacPherson, Jamie Cerreta and Dave Ayers. They were joined by Michael MacDonald, Pete Robinson and Casey Robison. The company was acquired by Hipgnosis Songs Fund in 2020.

Prior to its sale, the publisher's catalogue had earned 5 Grammy Awards; 126 NMPA, BMI and ASCAP awards; and 27 RIAA certifications.

== History ==
The company was founded in 2012 by former Chrysalis Music employees Kenny MacPherson, Jamie Cerreta and Dave Ayers in Los Angeles.

In September 2020, Big Deal was acquired by Hipgnosis Songs Fund. The company, including its Words and Music publisher, was immediately renamed Hipgnosis Songs Group. MacPherson was named CEO of Hipgnosis Songs Group, with co-presidents Cerreta and Robinson, executive vice president Ayers, and senior vice president Robinson signing new five year contracts with the publisher.

In October 2023, MacPherson was placed on leave from Hipgnosis Songs due to a lawsuit filed accusing him of sexual assault and battery by a former colleague, stemming from his time at Chrysalis Music.

In June 2025, Hipgnosis sold the Big Deal Music catalogue to Sony Music Publishing.

The roster included: My Morning Jacket, Teddy Geiger, Sleater-Kinney, Ray LaMontagne, St. Vincent, The Afghan Whigs, Dan Wilson, Martie Maguire & Emily Robison, Jim James, Sharon Van Etten, The Black Angels, Ethan Johns, Preservation Hall Jazz Band, Missy Higgins, FIDLAR, Wye Oak, Birds of Tokyo, Pussy Riot, Underworld and Jonathan Wilson, and songwriters Brett Beavers, Tim James, Brad Tursi, John Ryan, Dave Sitek, Matt Morris and Matt Mahaffey. The company was administered by BMG and Peermusic.
