= Peermusic =

American independent music publisher

Southern Music Publishing Co., Inc.
- Trade name: peermusic
- Industry: Music publisher
- Founded: January 31, 1928
- Headquarters: New York City, United States
- Key people: Ralph Peer, II: Executive Chair and Mary Megan Peer: CEO
- Subsidiaries: Digitalpressure
- Website: Official website

Peermusic is a United States–based independent music publisher.

== Ralph S. Peer years ==
Ralph Peer, a field recording engineer and A&R representative for Victor Records, went on a scouting trip to Bristol, Tennessee. For two weeks, he recorded artists such as Jimmie Rodgers and The Carter Family in what later became famous as the Bristol sessions. With the success of these recordings, Peer incorporated Southern Music Publishing Co., Inc., on January 31, 1928. The company became successful and influential in the 1930s through Peer's introducing southern American music to the world. In 1940 there came another watershed when a dispute between ASCAP and US radio stations led to the inauguration of the rival Broadcast Music Incorporated (BMI). BMI supported music by blues, country and hillbilly artists, and Peer, through his Peer International Corporation, soon contributed a major part of BMI's catalogue.

During and after World War II, Peer published songs such as "Deep in the Heart of Texas" and "You Are My Sunshine" (sung by Jimmie Davis, covered by Bing Crosby and many others), "Humpty Dumpty Heart" (Glenn Miller), "You're Nobody till Somebody Loves You" (Russ Morgan), "The Three Caballeros" (the Andrews Sisters), "Say a Prayer for the Boys Over There" (Deanna Durbin), and "I Should Care" and "The Coffee Song" (both Frank Sinatra). In 1945, he published Jean Villard's and Bert Reisfeld's composition "Les trois cloches" ("The Three Bells"), which was recorded by The Browns. In 1948, Peer launched a classical music division.

In the 1950s Peer published "Mockingbird Hill", a million-seller for Patti Page; "Sway" (Dean Martin and Bobby Rydell); and the novelty "I Know an Old Lady" (Burl Ives). Then came rock 'n' roll, and Southern published hits by Buddy Holly, Little Richard, The Big Bopper and The Platters.

== After Ralph Peer ==
After Ralph Peer's death in 1960, his wife Monique Peer became CEO and held the role for 20 years. She maintained relationships with artists her husband had recorded, and signed many others.

In 2007, Peermusic announced the 50% acquisition of Malaco Music Group.

Ralph Peer II, the son of Ralph and Monique, became CEO in 1980. Peer II was also the vice president and director of the National Music Publishers Association and the Harry Fox Agency, and has been a director and president of the Country Music Association, an editor/director of American Society of Composers, Authors and Publishers, and Chairman of the International Confederation of Music Publishers (ICMP). At the 2008 MIDEM, he was honored as "Music Maker of the Year". In 2013, he received the inaugural ICMP award for "outstanding contribution to music publishing".

Peermusic's catalogue has included the publishing rights to David Foster, George Clinton, Corey Hart, Poo Bear, Salaam Remi, De La Ghetto, Big Deal Music, Molotov, KillBeatz, Edna Frida Pietsch, and Russian publisher First Music Publishing.

In October 2020, Peermusic announced its expansion into the neighboring rights with the acquisition of Canada-based Premier Muzik, France-based All Right Music, and Netherlands-based Global Master Rights.

Mary Megan Peer assumed the role of CEO of Peermusic in January 2021. Her father, Ralph Peer II, transitioned to executive chair.

In July 2022, Hipgnosis Songs Fund signed an international sub-publishing deal with Peermusic.

In October 2023, it was announced Peermusic had acquired the Oslo-headquartered indie music publisher, Arctic Rights Management.
