= That's How People Grow Up =

Single by Morrissey

from the album Greatest Hits
- Released: 4 February 2008
- Recorded: 2007
- Genre: Alternative rock
- Length: 2:59
- Label: Decca
- Songwriters: Morrissey; Boz Boorer
- Producer: Jerry Finn

Morrissey singles chronology
"I Just Want to See the Boy Happy" (2006)	"That's How People Grow Up" (2008)	"All You Need Is Me" (2008)

"That's How People Grow Up" is a 2008 single by British singer Morrissey. The song, released on 4 February 2008, was used to promote his latest Greatest Hits album. The song also appears on his 2009 album Years of Refusal.

The song was composed by long-time Morrissey guitarist and musical director Boz Boorer - his first composition to be released as a single since "Satan Rejected My Soul" from the album Maladjusted (1997). The song made its television debut on Late Show with David Letterman, and received its first radio play on Zane Lowe's Radio 1 show on 17 December. Prior to release, it featured on the BBC Radio 2 A-list, receiving around 20 plays per week.

On 10 February 2008, "That's How People Grow Up" entered the UK Singles Chart at number 14. Four days later it also entered the Swedish singles chart, at number 26.

== Track listing ==
=== 7": Decca / 4780363 ===
1. "That's How People Grow Up"
2. "The Boy with the Thorn in His Side" (live in Omaha, 11 May 2007)

=== 7": Decca / 4780364 ===
1. "That's How People Grow Up"
2. "Why Don't You Find Out for Yourself" (live in Salt Lake City, 15 October 2007)

=== CD: Decca / 4780362 ===
1. "That's How People Grow Up"
2. "The Last of the Famous International Playboys" (live in NYC, 27 October 2007)

== Musicians ==
- Morrissey - vocals
- Boz Boorer - guitar
- Jesse Tobias - guitar
- Solomon Walker - bass guitar
- Matt Walker - drums
- Michael Farrell - keyboard
- Kristeen Young - backing vocals
