= Years of Refusal =

Studio album by Morrissey
- Released: 16 February 2009
- Recorded: 2007 – May 2008
- Genres: Alternative rock; indie rock
- Length: 43:25
- Labels: Decca; Polydor (UK); Attack; Lost Highway (US)
- Producer: Jerry Finn

Morrissey chronology
Greatest Hits (2008)	Years of Refusal (2009)	Swords (2009)

Singles from Years of Refusal
- 1. "I'm Throwing My Arms Around Paris" Released: 9 February 2009; 2. "Something Is Squeezing My Skull" Released: 27 April 2009

Years of Refusal is the ninth studio album by the English alternative rock singer Morrissey. It was released on 16 February 2009 in the UK by record label Decca and on 17 February 2009 in the US by Lost Highway.

It was the last album completed by producer Jerry Finn before his death. The album is also notable for being the first Morrissey album since Your Arsenal not to feature lead guitar from Alain Whyte, who was permanently replaced by Jesse Tobias.

== Recording ==
Recording for the album commenced in late November 2007 and ended in late December in Los Angeles at Conway Recording Studios. An additional track for the album was recorded in late May according to drummer Matt Walker. Keyboardist Michael Farrell left the band prior to the album's completion so Morrissey recruited Roger Manning to fill in. Manning previously played on Morrissey's 2004 album You Are the Quarry. Manning had this to say about the recording of the album:

I've spent over six weeks recording with Morrissey and his incredible band for what will hopefully become his latest solo effort later this year. Producer Jerry Finn and I have had a long fun filled history together in punk pop heaven with groups like Blink-182 and found ourselves both being invited back for our second Morrissey album. I think fans will be pleasantly surprised by this new solo offering. It was all tracked live which added a great punk, garage, DIY urgency to the tracks. I am so used to recording keyboards in the more traditional overdub scenario that being asked to invent parts "on the fly" and track with the band while Morrissey sang live was a very refreshing and challenging experience.

In an interview on BBC Radio 5 Live with Tony Visconti, the producer stated that his new project would be "the next Morrissey album", though that this would not be forthcoming for at least a year. However, in an interview with the BBC News website in October 2007, Morrissey said that the album was already written and ready for a possible Autumn 2008 release. In December, Morrissey signed a new deal with Decca Records, which included a Greatest Hits album and a newly recorded album to follow in Autumn 2008.

It was announced in November 2007 that Jerry Finn, the man behind Morrissey's 2004 album You Are the Quarry, would be producing the new album instead of Tony Visconti. A reason for the change was rumored to be related to Kristeen Young, Morrissey's opening act at the time, and Visconti's supposed involvement.

On 30 May 2008, true-to-you.net posted the following on Morrissey's 2008 album:

Morrissey's new studio album Years of Refusal is now complete, and is set for a September release by Polydor UK (Universal). It has yet to be decided which Universal label will release the album in the US. Years of Refusal has 12 tracks and is produced by Jerry Finn.

Featured tracks "That's How People Grow Up", "All You Need Is Me", "Something Is Squeezing My Skull", "Mama Lay Softly on the Riverbed", "I'm Throwing My Arms Around Paris" and "One Day Goodbye Will Be Farewell" were all debuted on Morrissey's 2007–2008 Greatest Hits tour.

== Content ==
Of the 12 tracks, current guitarist Boz Boorer wrote four and former guitarist Alain Whyte wrote five. The remaining three tracks are Jesse Tobias compositions. Though he wrote nearly half the songs on the album Whyte did not participate in the recording. Years of Refusal marks the first time since 1992's Your Arsenal that Alain Whyte has not performed on a Morrissey album.

The photo on the album cover for Years of Refusal is a portrait by Jake Walters. The baby pictured with Morrissey is Sebastien Pesel-Browne, who is the son of Charlie Browne, Morrissey's assistant tour manager. Sebastien's mother met Charlie at a Morrissey concert in Boston.

== Release ==
It was later announced that 23 February 2009 would be the new release date for Years of Refusal. Finally, in a press release from Universal Music it was announced that the final release date for the album would be 16 February 2009 with the first single, "I'm Throwing My Arms Around Paris", preceding the album a week earlier on 9 February 2009.

Years of Refusal reached number 3 in the UK Albums Chart.

== Reception ==
Professional ratings
Aggregate scores
Source	Rating
Metacritic	79/100
Review scores
Source	Rating
AllMusic	4/5 stars
The Guardian	3/5 stars
Mojo	3/5 stars
NME	8/10
The Observer	4/5 stars
Pitchfork	8.1/10
Q	3/5 stars
Rolling Stone	3.5/5 stars
Spin	4/5 stars
Uncut	4/5 stars

On 11 December 2008, Morrissey, along with Polydor president Ferdy Unger-Hamilton, unveiled Years of Refusal in London to a select group of journalists with a special listening of the album at Piccadilly's Pigalle Club. First impressions of the album were universally positive.

Early reviews of the album suggested a return to the form of You Are the Quarry, with Clash commenting that it is "in a word, 'brilliant'" and that "it's hard to listen to this album and not conclude that it's one of his best as a solo artist". Tom Ewing of Pitchfork, along with giving the album an 8.1 rating, lauded Years of Refusal highly for its "rejuvenation" of Morrissey:

Years of Refusal comes as a gratifying shock: It's his most vital, entertaining and savage record since 1994's Vauxhall and I. Rather than try and reinvent himself, Morrissey has rediscovered himself, finding new potency in his familiar arsenal. Morrissey's rejuvenation is most obvious in the renewed strength of his vocals. For much of Years of Refusal Morrissey is turning his fire outwards – taking on lovers, enemies, wannabes, or some combination of all three. This is Morrissey's most venomous, score-settling album, and in a perverse way that makes it his most engaging.

Q magazine, who gave the album a three star rating, praised and criticized the album saying: "So there is that fabulous voice, the felicitous turn of phrase, the ability to hit universal truths that transcend one middle-aged Mancunian's ingrained sense of being hard-done-by – but there's also too much grudge-bearing, too much self-justification, too much undistinguished guitar thump.

Morrissey has described it as his "strongest work to date".

== Track listing ==
No.	Title	Writer(s)	Length
1.	"Something Is Squeezing My Skull"	Morrissey, Alain Whyte	2:38
2.	"Mama Lay Softly on the Riverbed"	Morrissey, Whyte	3:53
3.	"Black Cloud"	Morrissey, Boz Boorer	2:48
4.	"I'm Throwing My Arms Around Paris"	Morrissey, Boorer	2:31
5.	"All You Need Is Me"	Morrissey, Jesse Tobias	3:13
6.	"When Last I Spoke to Carol"	Morrissey, Whyte	3:24
7.	"That's How People Grow Up"	Morrissey, Boorer	2:59
8.	"One Day Goodbye Will Be Farewell"	Morrissey, Boorer	2:57
9.	"It's Not Your Birthday Anymore"	Morrissey, Whyte	5:10
10.	"You Were Good in Your Time"	Morrissey, Whyte	5:01
11.	"Sorry Doesn't Help"	Morrissey, Tobias	4:03
12.	"I'm OK by Myself"	Morrissey, Tobias	4:48

iTunes US bonus tracks
No.	Title	Writer(s)	Length
13.	"Because of My Poor Education"	Morrissey, Whyte	2:56
14.	"Shame Is the Name"	Morrissey, Whyte	3:49

Note: Given the CD is a mockup of a vinyl record, the words "shame is the name" appear on the runout grooves.

Special edition DVD

1. "Wrestle with Russell" (an interview with Russell Brand)
2. "That's How People Grow Up" (performed live on Friday Night with Jonathan Ross)
3. "All You Need is Me" (performed live on Later... with Jools Holland)
4. "All You Need is Me" (promotional video)

== Personnel ==
- Morrissey – vocals
- Boz Boorer – guitar
- Jesse Tobias – guitar
- Solomon Walker – bass guitar
- Matt Walker – drums

Additional personnel

- Roger Joseph Manning Jr. – keyboards
- Mark Isham – trumpet on tracks 4, 6 and 8
- Jeff Beck – guitar on track 3
- Michael Farrell – keyboards, accordion, cowbell on track 7
- Kristopher Pooley – backing vocals on tracks 2, 6 and 8
- Kristeen Young – additional vocals on track 7
- Chrissie Hynde – backing vocals on track 14

Technical

- Jerry Finn – production
- Seth Waldmann – engineering
- Jake Walters – front cover photography
- Travis Shinn – sleeve photography (group)

== Charts ==
Chart performance for Years of Refusal
Chart (2009)	Peak position
Australian Albums (ARIA)	87
Austrian Albums (Ö3 Austria)	24
Belgian Albums (Ultratop Flanders)	8
Belgian Albums (Ultratop Wallonia)	42
Danish Albums (Hitlisten)	4
Dutch Albums (Album Top 100)	52
Finnish Albums (Suomen virallinen lista)	10
French Albums (SNEP)	29
German Albums (Offizielle Top 100)	4
Irish Albums (IRMA)	12
Italian Albums (FIMI)	25
Mexican Albums (AMPROFON)	29
Norwegian Albums (VG-lista)	6
Spanish Albums (Promusicae)	16
Swedish Albums (Sverigetopplistan)	5
Swiss Albums (Schweizer Hitparade)	32
UK Albums (Official Charts)	3
US Billboard 200	11

== Certifications ==
Certifications for Years of Refusal
Region	Certification	Certified units/sales
United Kingdom (BPI)	Silver	60,000^{*}
^{*} Sales figures based on certification alone.
