= Modern Nature =

Studio album by the Charlatans
- Released: 26 January 2015
- Recorded: 2014
- Studio: Big Mushroom
- Genre: Pop
- Length: 46:45
- Label: BMG
- Producers: The Charlatans; Jim Spencer

The Charlatans chronology
Who We Touch (2010)	Modern Nature (2015)	Different Days (2017)

Singles from Modern Nature
- 1. "Talking in Tones" Released: 29 September 2014; 2. "So Oh" Released: 1 December 2014; 3. "Come Home Baby" Released: 2 February 2015

Modern Nature is the twelfth studio album by British rock band the Charlatans. It was released through BMG on 26 January 2015. After the release of the band's eleventh studio album Who We Touch (2010), drummer Jon Brookes was diagnosed with brain cancer, and subsequently died in mid-2013. In early 2014, the band met up at their studio Big Mushroom with Jim Spencer, and began working on a new album. The sessions lasted seven months, and featured recordings from the drummers of the Verve, New Order, and Factory Floor. Described as a pop album, Modern Nature featured contributions from the High Llamas frontman Sean O'Hagan, as well as gospel vocals from Melanie Marshall and Sandra Marvin.

Preceded by the release of the singles "Talking in Tones" and "So Oh" in September and December 2014, respectively, Modern Nature was released with varying bonus tracks. The band promoted it with radio appearances, and in-store performances. To coincide with the release of the single "Come Home Baby" in February 2015, the band embarked on a UK headlining tour, their first since 2010. Over the course of the next year and a half, the band toured Japan, Europe, the United States, the UK, Australia, and at various UK festivals.

Modern Nature received generally positive reviews from music critics, some of whom commented on the album's throwback sound. The album charted at number 7 in the UK, and number 25 in Ireland.

== Background and production ==
Following the release of the Charlatans' 11th studio album Who We Touch (2010), drummer Jon Brookes was diagnosed with brain cancer while on tour in the United States; he was temporarily replaced by the Verve member Pete Salisbury, at the recommendation. Brookes later re-joined the band towards the end of the year. In February 2011, the band held a discussion for their next album, which they were aiming to release at some point in 2012. Later in 2011, vocalist Tim Burgess started his own record label O Genesis; him and guitarist Mark Collins went on an acoustic tour; and Burgess worked on a solo album. In mid-2012, the celebrated the 15th anniversary of their fifth studio album Tellin' Stories (1997) with two full-album performances, and a live album from one of the shows. Brookes suffered from a relapse in September that same year.

The band attempted to make an album, at the insistence of Brookes, however the effort was fruitless. In July 2013, keyboardist Tony Rogers said the band were anticipating going into the studio to work on new songs. In spite of Brookes receiving surgery that same month, Burgess announced Brookes' death in August. A benefit show was held for him two months later. Burgess and guitarist Mark Collins held a writing session Hastings, which resulted in several songs. The band congregated at a beach house in Rye where the recorded ideas using a portable studio and drums courtesy of a mobile app.

The band reconvened in early 2014 at their own studio Big Mushroom, and spurred on by the memories of Brookes, the band began recording in January that year. The members intentionally wanted to make an uplifting record; some songs were worked on between Burgess and Collins, bassist Mark Blunt and Rogers, or the whole band. Jim Spencer, who worked with them previously on their 2001–2008 albums, co-produced the proceedings. Drummers from different bands participated in the recording sessions: Salisbury, New Order member Stephen Morris, and Factory Floor member Gabriel Gurnsey. Morris and Gurnsey went into the studio to see how the band was progressing, only then to be asked to play on the recordings. Burgess expected the sessions to last three months, when in reality, they lasted seven.

== Composition ==
Musically, the sound of Modern Nature has been described as pop, with elements of disco, funk, and soul. Discussing the title, Burgess said he was visiting the band Grumbling Fur as they were recording song. They were in the middle of song when a book fell of a shelf and hit Burgess on the head. The book turned out to be Derek Jarman's diaries, entitled Modern Nature. Up to this point, they had already planned on calling it Nature as they had several songs with that as the working title. Some of the upbeat songs, such as "So Oh" and "Let the Good Times Be Never Ending", were reminiscent of the pop nature of the band's seventh studio album Wonderland (2001). Similarly, "So Oh" and "Come Home Baby" channel the band's early Madchester sound. The High Llamas frontman Sean O'Hagan contributed orchestration throughout the album, alongside gospel vocal harmonies from Melanie Marshall and Sandra Marvin. O'Hagan previously worked with Burgess for his solo album; Burgess made a mental note that if the Charlatans required strings, to ask O'Hagan.

The opening track "Talking in Tones" initially begins as a soundscape of glitch and electronica percussion loops, before shifting into 1960s beat music, with its chorus section being reminiscent of I'm a Man" (1967) by the Spencer Davis Group. It was the result of a jam session between Collins, who was playing drums, and Burgess, who was playing guitar. Burgess came up with the title while walking from Barclays bank on Upper Street, Islington to Flashback Records on Old Street. The track discusses telepathic communication, and reminded Burgess of the Tellin' Stories opening song "With No Shoes". Collins said "So Oh" was influenced by a Barry White song, while its bassline recalled the band's stand-alone single "The Only One I Know" (1990). Burgess wrote the song's lyrics about being in a location, figuring out how you get there, and included a reference to David Bowie.

"Come Home Baby" utilizes a gospel choir. Rogers had the verse music for it for sometime, until Burgess had a melody part for it, which he dubbed "Baby Huey" after the person of the same name. The soul track "Keep Enough" talks about mourning for an absent friend. It was the first song the band wrote after becoming a four-piece. "In the Tall Grass", alongside "Let the Good Times Be Never Ending", saw the band move into disco territory. The keyboard parts in the former were compared to those played by the Doors member Ray Manzarek. The song's overall sparse arrangement channelled the sound of the band's sixth studio album Us and Us Only (1999). Rogers wrote the music for the song while he was in Ireland. The vocals and plucked guitar parts in "Emilie" was compared to In Rainbows (2007)-era Radiohead.

"Let the Good Times Be Never Ending" is a cross between the music of the Doors and the 5th Dimension, with brass parts from Dexys Midnight Runners member Jim Paterson. The song was influenced by Little Anthony and the Imperials, and was initially scrapped on three occasions. The first idea for the song was a six-minute-long bass part that Rogers turned into two iterations, one with a Rhodes piano, and the second with a Hammond organ. Burgess, Collins and Blunt liked both versions that Rogers made. The final version was made after six months' worth of attempts, with a variety of additional instrumentation, such as drum machines and Chic-esque guitar playing. "I Need You to Know", alongside "Lean In", use an organ sound in the style of Noel Gallagher's High Flying Birds. "Lean In" features jangly guitarwork backing vocal harmonies recalled those hard in "Strawberry Wine" (1987) by My Bloody Valentine. It was the last song written for the album, with Burgess, Collins and Blunt working on the guitar parts of it until the early hours of the morning.

The piano-driven baggy song "Trouble Understanding" features several different dynamics and mood changes throughout it. Halfway through the song, a guitar line is heard, which builds towards a choral section. It was initially titled "Nature #1", and was written by Burgess with Lou Reed in mind. The closing track "Lot to Say" also evoked their Madchester sound, while incorporating elements of Motown. Burgess purposely wanted to end the album with a quiet track; he wrote it after moving to Norfolk when his son was born. "Walk with Me" was written by Brookes while laying in a hospital bed; it incorporates a back choir, which consisted of children from that that Brookes used to teach at. Brookes had dictated the song's lyrics three weeks prior to his death. "Honesty" is an acoustic instrumental rendition of "Emilie", with a string section, while "Marauder" is a drum and keyboard-based instrumental.

== Release ==
The Charlatans' manager sent some songs out, which received attention from several labels. One of the labels, BMG, was interested in the band. Their staff member Thomas was ecstatic about the four tracks he had been shown and asked for more. The music video for "Talking in Tones" was released on 23 September 2014, directed by Nik Colk Void. The track was released as a single six days later; the 7" vinyl version included a remix of the same song. On 20 October, Modern Nature was scheduled for release later in December that year. The music video for "So Oh" was released on 10 November, and was filmed in Santa Marinella, Italy. The track was released a single on 1 December; the 7" vinyl version included a Brian Jonestown Massacre remix of the same song as the B-side. The music video for "Come Home Baby" was released on 15 January 2015.

Modern Nature was made available through The Guardian's website on 21 January 2015, and eventually released through BMG five days later. The physical deluxe edition included a bonus disc which contained "We Sleep on Borrowed Time", "Walk with Me", "As Long as You Stick by Me", and the demo "I Will Never Leave You". The digital deluxe edition featured "We Sleep on Borrowed Time", "Walk with Me", alongside "Honesty" and "Marauder" as bonus tracks. The Japanese edition included all of the bonus track from the physical and digital deluxe editions, alongside remixes. Some vinyl versions featured the physical deluxe edition bonus tracks, while other versions featured remixes. The artwork sees the band on a beach with the sun in the background.

The album was promoted with appearances on various radio stations, and performances at record stores. "Come Home Baby" was released as a single on 2 February 2015, and featured a Simon Fisher Turner remix of the same song. Later that month, the band played a show at the Brooklyn Bowl to coincide with the 2015 Brit Awards. The following month, the band embarked on a UK tour with Salisbury acting as their drummer. The stint marked the band's first full tour of the UK since 2010. Later in the month, Modern Nature was released in the US on 24 March.

In April 2015, they toured across Japan; footage from the trek was later compiled into the music video for "Let the Good Times Be Never Ending", directed by Libby Burke Wilde. On 28 April, the band performed "Let the Good Times Be Never Ending" on Later... with Jools Holland. In June and July, the band performed at the Latitude, Isle of Wight, Truck and Glastonbury Festivals, and played at Castlefield Bowl. In September, they toured Europe, before going on a US in November, with support from the Eyelids. In December, the band toured the UK again; around this trek, Modern Nature was re-issued on vinyl. In March 2016, the band went on a tour of Australia. Norman Cook remixes of "Trouble Understanding" were released on a 12" vinyl single as part of Record Store Day 2016.

== Reception ==
Professional ratings
Aggregate scores
Source	Rating
AnyDecentMusic?	7.6/10
Metacritic	80/100
Review scores
Source	Rating
AllMusic	4/5 stars
Clash	7/10
Daily Express	4/5
The Daily Telegraph	5/5 stars
Drowned in Sound	8/10
Exclaim!	7/10
The Guardian	4/5 stars
London Evening Standard	4/5 stars
Loud and Quiet	8/10
musicOMH	4.5/5 stars

Modern Nature was met with generally positive reviews from music critics. At Metacritic, the album received an average score of 80, based on 16 reviews. Similarly, at AnyDecentMusic?, the album had an average rating of 7.6, based on 18 reviews.

musicOMH contributor Graeme Marsh found Modern Nature "[q]uite simply stunning", calling it "a must-have." He added, it was "[w]holly unexpected and majestic," with "repeated plays" that "will reward tenfold". AllMusic reviewer Stephen Thomas Erlewine praised the album's "soulful undercurrents," making it sound "more unified than Who We Touch and also contemplative". He said, a lot of the record's "haziness derives from the shimmering production". The Guardian writer Lanre Bakare said that, "[f]rom the saddest of starting points, the Charlatans have made a joyful eulogy – and possibly the best album of their career." Drowned in Sound's Dom Gourlay wrote that the album "fuses elements of the band's past glories with a vision firmly ensconced in the future." It acted as "another prized addition to The Charlatans' already wealthy canon."

Hayley Scott of Loud and Quiet referred to it as "fragile, danceable and never void of idiosyncrasies." London Evening Standard critic David Smyth wrote that the record "wears its sorrows lightly .. [with] no sense that the band are tossing out one more album for old time’s sake. Despite more troubles than most, they sound rejuvenated." Daily Express writer Martin Townsend said the band "return with a record that has all the vibrancy of a debut." Writing for Exclaim!, Lisa Sookraj described the album as "a fluid release, a chilled-out, soulful take on the Charlatans' psychedelic sound complemented by muted horns and jazzy keys." Clash's Mat Smith found that "much of this album seems to hark back to the 1970s", while in other parts of it, "the addition of dense production," plant the tracks "in an era that only now seems to be appreciated for what it produced."

Modern Nature reached number 7 in the UK; their highest in 14 years since Wonderland, which reached number 2. It also reached number 25 in Ireland.

== Track listing ==
Modern Nature standard track listing
No.	Title	Length
1.	"Talking in Tones"	4:41
2.	"So Oh"	4:09
3.	"Come Home Baby"	3:56
4.	"Keep Enough"	4:18
5.	"In the Tall Grass"	3:50
6.	"Emilie"	3:18
7.	"Let the Good Times Be Never Ending"	6:30
8.	"I Need You to Know"	4:39
9.	"Lean In"	3:44
10.	"Trouble Understanding"	4:07
11.	"Lot to Say"	3:33

Physical deluxe edition bonus disc
No.	Title	Length
1.	"We Sleep on Borrowed Time"	4:27
2.	"Walk with Me"	4:07
3.	"As Long as You Stick by Me"	4:14
4.	"I Will Never Leave You" (demo)	3:02

Digital deluxe edition bonus tracks
No.	Title	Length
12.	"We Sleep on Borrowed Time"	4:27
13.	"Walk with Me"	4:07
14.	"Honesty"	3:17
15.	"Marauder" (instrumental)	3:39

== Personnel ==
The Charlatans

- Tim Burgess – lead vocals
- Tony Rogers – Hammond Organ, Piano, Melotron, backing vocals
- Mark Collins – guitar
- Martin Blunt – bass

"Walk With Me"

- CJ Allen – vocals
- Dan Oakey – vocals
- Eleanor Southwell – vocals
- David Longdon – vocals
- Vin Whyte – vocals

Additional personnel

- Peter Salisbury – drums (tracks 1, 2, 5, 8, and 9)
- Gabriel Gurnsey – drums (tracks 3, 7, 10, and 11)
- Stephen Morris – drums (track 6)
- Dave Tolan – drums (track 4)

== Charts ==
Chart (2015)	Peak position
Irish Albums (IRMA)	25
UK Albums (Official Charts)	7
