= Spent the Day in Bed =

Single by Morrissey

from the album Low in High School
- Released: 19 September 2017
- Length: 3:31
- Label: BMG
- Songwriter: Gustavo Manzur / Morrissey
- Producer: Joe Chiccarelli

Morrissey singles chronology
"Kiss Me a Lot" (2015)	"Spent the Day in Bed" (2017)	"Jacky's Only Happy When She's Up on the Stage" (2017)

"Spent the Day in Bed" is a song by English singer-songwriter Morrissey. It was produced by Joe Chiccarelli. The song was released via BMG Rights Management on 19 September 2017 as the lead single from Morrissey's eleventh solo studio album, Low in High School (2017), and a free download when pre-ordering the album. A 7" vinyl single with a live cover version of "Judy Is a Punk" by The Ramones on the b-side was released on 27 October 2017.

== Background ==
On 18 September 2017, Morrissey teased the single by writing in his first-ever tweet: "Spent the day in bed..." On 19 September 2017, BBC Radio 6 Music first confirmed that it was the single's title, before unveiling it on the radio show. It later received the first radio play on Chris Evans' BBC Radio 2 breakfast show.

== Track listing ==
Digital download

1. "Spent the Day in Bed" – 3:31

7" vinyl

1. "Spent the Day in Bed"
2. "Judy Is a Punk" (live)

== Critical reception ==
Ben Beaumont-Thomas of The Guardian described the song as "typically existentialist, Eeyoreish". Lars Gotrich of NPR called the song "an electric piano boogie whirred to life by strings, the recognizably Smiths-y guitar tone and DJ scratching". Neil McCormick of The Daily Telegraph wrote that the song "boasted a vintage Morrissey construction in its flowing, easygoing melody over an urgent rhythm section, although with a fresh energy to the arrangement", and "constructed around a fast, almost Baroque keyboard line and psychedelic rhythm guitar" compared with "the sparkling indie guitars of The Smiths". August Brown of Los Angeles Times opined that the song's "electric piano-driven riff is a bit of a departure from [Morrissey's] usual palette". Caitlin Kelley of Billboard felt "the song opens with jangly electric piano, foregrounded by smokey synths".

Matthew Oshinsky of Paste regarded it as "a peppy, organ-driven song about checking out from the news cycle and resisting the media narrative". Sam Sodomsky of Pitchfork felt the song features "an electronic symphony of squelching synths". Hayden Wright of CBS Radio described the song as a "plucky, upbeat track". Winston Cook-Wilson of Spin felt the song is "driven by a snappy electric piano riff and wah-wah synths".

Clara Kavanagh of Today FM wrote that the song "delivers us all the classic Morrissey magic with a new contemporary energy". Corbin Reiff of Uproxx thought that the song "has an upbeat sort of vibe, with a chipper electric piano melody to propel it forward". Robin Murray of Clash opined that "the jaunty electric piano riff adds fresh energy to Morrissey's vocal".

== Promotional video ==
A promotional video was released on 17 October 2017, directed by Sophie Muller featuring Joey Barton pushing Morrissey around in a wheelchair, and a contemporary dance performance by avant-garde performance artiste David Hoyle. The video was filmed at Peckham Liberal Club.

== Credits and personnel ==
Credits adapted from Tidal.

- Joe Chiccarelli – production
- Chris Allgood – mastering engineering, assisting
- Emily Lazar – mastering engineering
- Davide Dell'Amore – engineering
- Damien Arlot – engineering
- Bill Mims – engineering
- Morgane Mayollet – engineering
- Samuel Wahl – engineering
- Morrissey - Lead vocal
- Gustavo Manzur – keyboard, background vocals
- Mando Lopez – bass guitar, bass
- Matt Walker – drums
- Boz Boorer – guitar
- Jesse Tobias – guitar
- Roger Joseph Manning Jr. – horns arranging, string arranging
- Maxime Le Guil – mixing, recording
- Andy Martin – trombone
- Fred Simmons – trombone
- Erik Arvinder – viola
- Songa Lee – violin
- Kathleen Sloan – violin

== Charts ==
Chart (2017)	Peak position
Scottish Singles Sales (Official Charts)	23
UK Singles (Official Charts)	69
US Adult Alternative Airplay (Billboard)	13
US Rock & Alternative Airplay (Billboard)	39
