= Jacky's Only Happy When She's Up on the Stage =

Single by Morrissey

from the album Low in High School
- Released: 7 November 2017
- Length: 4:19
- Label: BMG
- Songwriters: Boz Boorer; Morrissey
- Producer: Joe Chiccarelli

Morrissey singles chronology
"Spent the Day in Bed" (2017)	"Jacky's Only Happy When She's Up on the Stage" (2017)	"My Love, I'd Do Anything for You" (2018)

"Jacky's Only Happy When She's Up on the Stage" is a song by the English singer-songwriter Morrissey. It was produced by Joe Chiccarelli. The song was released via BMG Rights Management on 7 November 2017 as the second single from Morrissey's eleventh solo studio album, Low in High School (2017). A 7" vinyl single was released on 8 December 2017, featuring an Elvis Presley cover on the B-side.

The cover features a 1983 photo by Miron Zownir.

It reached number one on the UK Vinyl Singles Chart, where it remained for two weeks, including the Christmas number one week of 2017. When Morrissey performed the song live at the BBC's Maida Vale Studios (for broadcast on BBC Radio 6 Music), he changed the lyrics "exit, exit" to "Brexit, exit".

== Music video ==
The video was directed by Robert Hales and features Morrissey and his band doing a dance routine.

== Track listing ==
Digital download

1. "Jacky's Only Happy When She's Up on the Stage" – 4:19

7" vinyl

1. "Jacky's Only Happy When She's Up on the Stage" – 4:19
2. "You'll Be Gone" (live)
