= Recognition Music Group =

UK music company

- Formerly: Hipgnosis Songs Fund, Hipgnosis Songs Assets, Hipgnosis Song Management
- Type: Private
- Industry: Music publishing; IP investments
- Founded: 2024
- Headquarters: London, England
- Area served: Worldwide
- Key people: Ben Katovsky (CEO); Daniel Pounder (CFO); Sara Lord (Chief Creative Officer); Jon Baker (General Counsel)
- Owner: Blackstone Inc.
- Number of employees: (40)
- Website: recognitionmusicgroup.com

Recognition Music Group is one of the largest investors and managers of music IP rights and headquartered in London. The company was created in 2024 through the combination of songs and recordings owned by Blackstone Inc's Hipgnosis Songs Assets and the formerly listed Hipgnosis Songs Fund, which Blackstone took private in July 2024. RMG includes the former Hipgnosis Song Management, which was investment adviser to both funds. The combined business was rebranded as Recognition Music Group in March 2025. On May 30, 2025, Sony Music Publishing acquired its subsidiary Hipgnosis Songs Group, and on May 11, 2026, it was announced that Sony Music Publishing would acquire Recognition's complete catalog in a deal which was reported on July 15, 2026 as having completed following regulatory approvals. When the deal was announced, Blackstone said it intended to continue to invest across the music sector through recognition.

== History ==
Logo as Hipgnosis Songs Fund (2018-2025)

=== 2018: Founding of Hipgnosis Songs Fund, debut on London Stock Exchange ===
Hipgnosis Songs Fund was founded by Merck Mercuriadis, who has managed artists including Elton John, Iron Maiden, Morrissey, Beyoncé, and Nile Rodgers. Mercuriadis said in a February 2019 interview, "Nile [Rodgers] and I, one day, just started riffing off of these ideas of how do we change this system, how do we change what’s going on today where the songwriter–who provides the most important component in an artist having success–is the lowest person on the totem pole?" Mercuriadis believed that a rights and song management company with substantial assets could change the existing economics of publishing for songwriters, and in 2018 building capital by offering investors pure-play exposure to songs and associated musical intellectual property rights in place, HSF was formally founded. The company was named after Hipgnosis, the art and design group founded by Storm Thorgerson and Aubrey Powell. The Family (Music) Limited, an advisory board which included Mercuriadis, Rodgers, Starrah, The-Dream, David A. Stewart, Nick Jarjour, Bill Leibowitz, and Ian Montone was established in 2018. Rodney Jerkins (Darkchild) joined the advisory board in July 2020.

Hipgnosis Songs Fund went public in July 2018; an earlier plan to float the company in the UK had been postponed to conduct further due diligence. Its prospectus said that there was a "unique market opportunity as technology disruption is changing the way music is consumed." At its July 10, 2018 launch on the British Stock Exchange, HSF raised £202m, well over its goal. Trading as SONG, it was one of two investment trust IPOs that were oversubscribed that year. After it was listed the company reported that it had acquired a 75 percent interest in its first music rights catalog from musician The-Dream for £18.83 million. Among other hits, the 302-song collection included Justin Bieber's "Baby", Rihanna's "Umbrella", and Beyonce's "Single Ladies (Put a Ring on It)".

By the end of 2018, Hipgnosis acquired the Poo Bear catalogue of 214 songs, including Justin Bieber's "What Do You Mean?" and the English language version of "Despacito"; a 37.5% stake in Chic co-founder Bernard Edwards' catalog, which comprised 290 songs including "Everybody Dance", "Le Freak," "I Want Your Love," and "Good Times"; the 121-song catalog of TMS including "Don't Be So Hard On Yourself" for Jess Glynne, and "Wings" and "DNA" for Little Mix; and the 121-song catalog of Tricky Stewart, who co-wrote many of The-Dream's hit songs, including "Me Against the Music" (by Britney Spears and Madonna), and Mariah Carey's "Touch My Body."

=== 2019: Acquisitions, second and third raise, listing on LSE Premium segment ===
Prior to a second raise of £146.5 million in April 2019, Hipgnosis acquired the 182-song catalog of Giorgio Tuinfort, including more than 15 UK Top 10 singles with David Guetta; Itaal Shur (209 songs including "Smooth"), the 249-song catalog of Johnta Austin, ("We Belong Together" by Carey, "Be Without You" by Mary J Blige); 588 songs by Sean Garrett including "Yeah", Ciara's "Goodies, and "Check on It by Beyoncé; and the 245 song catalog of Rico Love including ""Without You" by Guetta. In October 2019, the company acquired Timbaland's catalog, which included all six albums by Missy Elliott, and the five Justin Timberlake albums which Timbaland produced. The catalog consists of 108 albums and songs with collective sales in excess of 32 million. Five songs co-owned by Hipgnosis appeared in the Top 10 on Billboard's Hot 100 of the decade chart. (The Chainsmokers featuring Halsey's "Closer", "Uptown Funk" by Mark Ronson, "Shape of You" by Ed Sheeran, Maroon 5 featuring Cardi B., "Girls Like You", and "Despacito" by Luis Fonsi & Daddy Yankee featuring Bieber). In December 2019, Hipgnosis added the first four studio albums by Kaiser Chiefs, and the songwriting catalog of Jack Antonoff to its repertoire.

Hipgnosis raised £49.9 million in August 2019, and an additional £233.7 million in October, bringing its "acquisition warchest" to nearly £650 million. As of October 2019, HSF holdings included more than 6000 songs, with hits from every decade since the 1950s, valued at £1.2 billion. In November 2019 the company was admitted to the London Stock Exchange Premium Segment of the Official List on the completion of four equity fundraises since its launch in June 2018.

=== 2020: Acquisition of Kobalt Capital, Hipgnosis Songs Group, FTSE 250 Index ===
In January 2020, former blink-182 guitarist Tom DeLonge sold his publishing rights to Hipgnosis. In April 2020 the company acquired 70% of Mark Ronson's catalog. On 2 July 2020, to fund new investments to build a "pipeline of catalogs with an acquisition value of over £1bn," Hipgnosis announced that it planned to raise an additional £200 million through issuing a new tranche of class C shares. On July 7, after the release of its FY2020 annual report—which disclosed that Hipgnosis had generated £65.661 million in revenue during its 2020 fiscal year—the company's market capitalisation hit an all-time high of nearly £1 billion.

Hipgnosis exceeded its July 2020 fundraising goal of £200 million after its new share placing was oversubscribed. The company raised £236.4 million, its largest equity amount getting more than £862 million. It then acquired the catalogs of Jerkins, RedOne, and Barry Manilow bringing its portfolio to approximately 13,300 songs. In August 2020, Hipgnosis's market capitalisation exceeded £1 bn. In September 2020, the company acquired the American music publisher Big Deal Music, adding 4,400 copyrights to the company's portfolio. Big Deal was renamed Hipgnosis Songs Group. Later in September 2020, Hipgnosis announced that it would issue a new tranche of ordinary shares to raise £190 million, saying that the capital would be used to acquire 50 catalogs that it had identified and exclusively secured. The target of £190 million was reached in 72 hours, raising the fund's total to £1,052 bn, £392m of which was raised in two months.

Hipgnosis Songs Fund acquired all of the 162-song LA Reid catalog in October 2020. Reid also joined the Hipgnosis advisory board. In November 2020, Hipgnosis acquired 42 catalogs from Kobalt Music Group, comprising 1,500 songwriters and 33,000 songs, for $322.9 million. The acquired catalogs had been owned by Kobalt Capital's first fund, including Nettwerk, 50 Cent, Skrillex, The B-52s, Enrique Iglesias, and Steve Winwood. Kobalt continued to administer these catalogs. It was subsequently reported in December 2023 that Kobalt had bought back 20,000 songs from Hipgnosis Songs Fund.

Hipgnosis also bought a 50% stake in the publishing, neighboring rights and recording catalog of Rick James in November 2020. In December 2020, HSF reached a £1.25b market cap.

=== 2021–2024: Valuation, Blackstone investment and acquisition ===
In January 2021, Jimmy Iovine sold his producer royalties to Hipgnosis, including 259 recordings and his movie production royalties for 8 Mile, which starred Eminem and 50 Cent's Get Rich or Die Tryin'. Iovine said that proceeds generated from the purchase would fund a new high school in Los Angeles as part of the University of Southern California Iovine and Young Academy. Hipgnosis also acquired the catalog of Lindsey Buckingham from Fleetwood Mac, a 50% stake in the catalog of Neil Young, all 145 of Shakira's songs, and 43 songs produced by Bob Rock, a Canadian producer. In March 2021, Hipgnosis acquired the catalog of songwriter Carole Bayer Sager. In May 2021, the company acquired the song catalog of the Red Hot Chili Peppers (for its publishing business MoeBeToBlame Music) for a reported $140–$150 million. Hipgnosis also acquired the catalog of songwriter Andrew Watt. In August 2021, Hipgnosis acquired the catalogue of Christine McVie from Fleetwood Mac. On August 10, 2020, Hipgnosis acquired all of Chris Cornell's catalog of song rights (241 songs) including his band Soundgarden's catalog. Hipgnosis' annual report was published in July 2021, valuing the catalogue at $2.2 billion.

In October 2021, investment manager Blackstone Inc., and Hipgnosis Song Management announced a new $1bn partnership to invest in music rights and manage catalogs. Separate from the London-listed Hipgnosis Songs Fund, the partnership, Hipgnosis Songs Assets, was created to co-invest in future catalog acquisitions along with Hipgnosis Songs Fund. Additionally, Blackstone took an ownership stake in investment adviser Hipgnosis Song Management with the intention of supporting the expansion of its infrastructure and business functions, including developing new song management expertise, technology, and data science capabilities.

In May 2022, Hipgnosis acquired all of the Justin Timberlake catalog including the copyright, ownership, and financial interests of the writer's and publisher's share of public performance income. The worldwide administration rights to the compositions, subject to Timberlake's deal with Universal, expiring in 2025 were also acquired. In July 2022, Hipgnosis signed an international sub-publishing deal with Peermusic. French performance rights society SACEM agreed to collect digital royalties for Hipgnosis in Europe.

In January 2023, Hipgnosis Songs Capital acquired Justin Bieber's song catalogue and all of David Foster's writer’s share of performance income for all of his songs. In October 2023, Hipgnosis Songs Group CEO Kenny MacPherson was placed on leave due to a lawsuit accusing him of sexual assault and battery by a former colleague, stemming from while he was at Chrysalis Music.

=== Rejection of proposed disposals ===
On October 14, 2023, in response to concerns that the share price was not reflecting the value of the company, it was proposed that the company would sell some of its catalogs in two disposals for £440 million and $25 million respectively in order to fund a share buyback of up to $180 million. The first disposal involved selling 29 music catalogs to Hipgnosis Songs Capital. Some investors criticized the proposed deal as it involved selling nearly a fifth of the portfolio to Hipgnosis Songs Capital, also managed by Mercuriadis, "at a considerable discount".

In response to a ruling by the Copyright Royalty Board, the quarterly dividend was also canceled on October 16, 2023, causing a further fall in the share price. Subsequently, Hipgnosis Songs Fund confirmed that Mercuriadis has an option to buy all of its rights if his investment advisory company is terminated.

Shareholders also voted overwhelmingly (83.2%) to reject proposals for the company to continue to operate as an investment trust for another five years. It was also noted that, if no agreement is reached with shareholders, the company will have to be wound down or sold. Mercuriadis said "[Yesterday’s] Hipgnosis Songs Fund AGM marks an opportunity to reset and focus on the future. Our conversations with shareholders have revealed a consensus that they are enthusiastic about the quality of [HSF's] iconic portfolio of songs." Robert Naylor was appointed chairman of the company, after the removal of Sutch, on 7 November 2023. In December 2023, Hipgnosis announced that it would delay the publication of its year-end results after finding that the company's own valuation was "materially higher than the valuation implied by proposed and recent transactions in the sector".

In February 2024, Mercuriadis was named chairman of Hipgnosis Songs Management. It was announced that Ben Katovsky, previously the company's president and chief operating officer, would serve as its CEO. Recognition raised $1.47bn in October 2024, in one of the largest ever music rights asset-backed securitizations, and then a further $372m in July 2025, which was the first (and at the time only) music asset-backed security to be publicly rated by ratings agencies Fitch and Standard & Poor's.

=== 2024–2025: Creation of Recognition Music Group ===
After a heated bidding war with Apollo-backed US investment group Concord Music Group, Blackstone agreed, in April 2024, to acquire the listed Hipgnosis Songs Fund for $1.6bn, valuing the business at $1.31 per share. After the deal was completed, Merck Mercuriadis stood down as chair of Hipgnosis Song Management.

In March 2025 the combined business was rebranded as Recognition Music Group, with Ben Katovsky becoming the CEO and calling the new integrated business "fundamentally different" to before. At the time of the rebrand, Blackstone senior managing director Qasim Abbas said his firm was "committed to the asset class and market", because of the "long-term cash flow profile" for music rights. He stated that Recognition was set to build on its position as a "leading independent investor in music rights".

On May 30, 2025, after a strategic review, Recognition sold its US songs publishing and administration business to Sony Music Publishing for an undisclosed sum.

On May 11, 2026, it was announced that Sony Music Publishing would acquire the entire Recognition catalog. Following regulatory approvals, this transaction was reported as having completed July 15, 2026.
