= Low in High School =

- The French vinyl edition features a blue background rather than an orange one.

Studio album by Morrissey
- Released: 17 November 2017
- Studio: Forum Studios, Italy; La Fabrique Studios, France
- Genre: Alternative rock; pop rock
- Length: 53:25
- Label: BMG
- Producer: Joe Chiccarelli

Morrissey chronology
World Peace Is None of Your Business (2014)	Low in High School (2017)	California Son (2019)

Alternative cover
- 2018 deluxe edition cover

Singles from Low in High School
- 1. "Spent the Day in Bed" Released: 19 September 2017; 2. "Jacky's Only Happy When She's Up on the Stage" Released: 7 November 2017; 3. "My Love, I'd Do Anything for You" Released: 23 March 2018; 4. "All the Young People Must Fall in Love" Released: 6 July 2018

Low in High School is the eleventh solo studio album by British singer Morrissey, released on 17 November 2017 through BMG. It was produced by Joe Chiccarelli, and recorded at La Fabrique Studios in France and at Ennio Morricone's Forum Studios in Italy.

The album debuted at number 5 on the UK Albums Chart. Low in High School generally received mixed or average reviews.

== Background and release ==
Prior to the album's release, it was reported that several retailers including HMV had refused to stock the album due to its cover art, though this was later denied by HMV. The child on the cover is Max Lopez (noted in the article as Msax), the son of Morrissey's bassist, Mando Lopez.

The first single, "Spent the Day in Bed", received its first play on 19 September 2017 and was released on the same day. Along with the release of the single, Morrissey announced an upcoming US tour. "I Wish You Lonely" was released as an instant grat download on 24 October. "Jacky's Only Happy When She's Up on the Stage" was released on 7 November. Two more singles were released in 2018.

The 'deluxe edition' of Low in High School was released in December 2018, and features four extra studio tracks and five bonus live tracks. The deluxe edition studio track "Back on the Chain Gang" was issued as a single in late 2018.

== Critical reception ==
Professional ratings
Aggregate scores
Source	Rating
Metacritic	59/100
Review scores
Source	Rating
AllMusic	3/5 stars
The A.V. Club	B
The Daily Telegraph	4/5 stars
The Guardian	3/5 stars
The Irish Times	4/5 stars
Mojo	3/5 stars
NME	2/5 stars
Pitchfork	5.7/10
Rolling Stone	3.5/5 stars
The Times	2/6 stars

On the review aggregator website Metacritic, Low in High School has a score of 59 out of 100 based on 43 reviews, indicating "mixed or average" reception. Stephen Thomas Erlewine of AllMusic gave Low in High School a rating of three out of five stars, stating it is "one of Morrissey's most musically adventurous records" but "can seem as aurally conflicted as it is politically". Josh Modell, writing for The A.V. Club, gave the album a B rating and said it might be Morrissey's best release since You Are the Quarry. Alexis Petridis in The Guardian also gave it three out of five stars. Jordan Bassett, writing for NME, gave the album two out of five stars, stating "the 12-song album's first five tracks are passable, if not actually quite enjoyable. Beyond this point, though, only the most hardened Moz fan should dare to venture."

=== Accolades ===
Publication	Accolade	Rank	Ref.
Radio X	30 Best New Albums of 2017	N/A	

== Track listing ==
No.	Title	Writer(s)	Length
1.	"My Love, I'd Do Anything for You"	Morrissey; Mando Lopez	4:43
2.	"I Wish You Lonely"	Morrissey; Boz Boorer	2:59
3.	"Jacky's Only Happy When She's Up on the Stage"	Morrissey; Boorer	4:19
4.	"Home Is a Question Mark"	Morrissey; Lopez	4:00
5.	"Spent the Day in Bed"	Morrissey; Gustavo Manzur	3:31
6.	"I Bury the Living"	Morrissey; Jesse Tobias	7:25
7.	"In Your Lap"	Morrissey; Manzur	4:36
8.	"The Girl from Tel-Aviv Who Wouldn't Kneel"	Morrissey; Manzur	4:57
9.	"All the Young People Must Fall in Love"	Morrissey; Boorer	3:37
10.	"When You Open Your Legs"	Morrissey; Tobias	3:17
11.	"Who Will Protect Us from the Police?"	Morrissey; Boorer	4:05
12.	"Israel"	Morrissey; Manzur	5:56
Total length:			53:25

Deluxe edition
No.	Title	Writer(s)	Length
13.	"Lover-to-Be"	Morrissey; Boorer	4:09
14.	"Back on the Chain Gang"	Chrissie Hynde	3:51
15.	"Never Again Will I Be a Twin"	Morrissey; Lopez	4:15
16.	"This Song Doesn't End When It's Over"	Morrissey; Boorer	3:57
17.	"You'll Be Gone" (live)	Elvis Presley; Red West; Charlie Hodge	2:33
18.	"Rose Garden" (live)	Joe South	3:06
19.	"Are You Sure Hank Done It This Way?" (live)	Waylon Jennings	3:25
20.	"I Didn't Know What to Do" (live)	Gilbert O'Sullivan	1:54
21.	"Judy Is a Punk" (live)	Joey Ramone	1:37

== Personnel ==
- Morrissey – lead vocals

Additional personnel

- Jesse Tobias – guitars
- Gustavo Manzur – keyboards, backing vocals
- Boz Boorer – guitars
- Matthew Ira Walker – drums
- Mando Lopez – bass guitar
- Roger Joseph Manning – string arrangement, horn arrangement
- H.E.R. – violin (8, 12)
- Steve Aho – orchestration
- Songa Lee – violin
- Kathleen Sloan – violin
- Erik Arvinder – viola
- Andy Martin – trombone
- Fred Simmons – trombone
- Davide Dell'Amore – engineering
- Damien Arlot – engineering
- Samuel Wahl – engineering
- Morgane Myollet – engineering
- Miro Lagioa – technical
- Joe Chiccarelli – producing

== Charts ==
Chart (2017)	Peak position
Australian Albums (ARIA)	81
Austrian Albums (Ö3 Austria)	18
Belgian Albums (Ultratop Flanders)	19
Belgian Albums (Ultratop Wallonia)	67
Croatian International Albums (HDU)	34
Dutch Albums (Album Top 100)	40
Finnish Albums (Suomen virallinen lista)	20
French Albums (SNEP)	71
German Albums (Offizielle Top 100)	15
Irish Albums (IRMA)	8
Italian Albums (FIMI)	36
New Zealand Heatseeker Albums (RMNZ)	3
Scottish Albums (Official Charts)	2
Spanish Albums (PROMUSICAE)	36
Swedish Albums (Sverigetopplistan)	29
UK Albums (Official Charts)	5
US Billboard 200	20
