= The Youngest Was the Most Loved =

2006 single by Morrissey

Single by Morrissey

from the album Ringleader of the Tormentors
- B-side: "If You Don't Like Me, Don't Look at Me"; "Ganglord"; "A Song from Under the Floorboards"
- Released: 5 June 2006
- Length: 2:59
- Label: Sanctuary, Attack
- Songwriters: Morrissey, Jesse Tobias
- Producer: Tony Visconti

Morrissey singles chronology
"You Have Killed Me" (2006)	"The Youngest Was the Most Loved" (2006)	"In the Future When All's Well" (2006)

"The Youngest Was the Most Loved" is the second single from English singer-songwriter Morrissey's eighth studio album, Ringleader of the Tormentors (2006). The track was written by Morrissey and Jesse Tobias. It was released as a single on 5 June 2006 and reached number 14 on the UK Singles Chart. The song was performed on the popular UK television chat show Friday Night with Jonathan Ross on 19 May 2006 and again on Later with Jools Holland on 2 June 2006.

B-side "A Song from Under the Floorboards" is a song originally written and recorded by Magazine, a post-punk band which shares Manchester origins with Morrissey.

== Track listings ==
CD single

1. "The Youngest Was the Most Loved" (Morrissey/Tobias)
2. "If You Don't Like Me, Don't Look at Me" (Morrissey/Tobias)

7-inch

1. "The Youngest Was the Most Loved" (Morrissey/Tobias)
2. "If You Don't Like Me, Don't Look at Me" (Morrissey/Tobias)

Maxi single

1. "The Youngest Was the Most Loved" (Morrissey/Tobias)
2. "Ganglord" (Morrissey/Whyte)
3. "A Song from Under the Floorboards" (Adamson/Devoto/Doyle/Formula/McGeoch)
4. "The Youngest Was the Most Loved" (Video)

US single

1. "The Youngest Was the Most Loved" (Morrissey/Tobias)
2. "If You Don't Like Me, Don't Look at Me" (Morrissey/Tobias)
3. "A Song From Under the Floorboards" (Adamson/Devoto/Doyle/Formula/McGeoch)
4. "Ganglord" (Morrissey/Whyte)
5. "The Youngest Was the Most Loved" (Video)

== Personnel ==
- Morrissey: voice
- Boz Boorer: guitars
- Jesse Tobias: guitars
- Alain Whyte: guitars
- Gary Day: bass
- Michael Farrell: keyboard
- Matt Chamberlain: drums (only on the A-side)
- Matt Walker: drums (only on the B-sides)

== Charts ==
Country	Chart position
UK Singles Chart	14
