= All You Need Is Me =

Single by Morrissey

from the album Greatest Hits
- B-side: "Children in Pieces"; "My Dearest Love"; "Drive-In Saturday"
- Released: 2 June 2008
- Recorded: 2007
- Genre: Alternative rock
- Length: 3:11
- Label: Decca
- Songwriters: Morrissey; Jesse Tobias
- Producer: Gustavo Santaolalla

Morrissey singles chronology
"That's How People Grow Up" (2008)	"All You Need Is Me" (2008)	"I'm Throwing My Arms Around Paris" (2009)

"All You Need Is Me" is a 2008 song by the English singer and songwriter Morrissey that is featured on his Greatest Hits album. It was released as a single on 2 June 2008 in the UK for only one week, reaching number 24 on the UK Singles Chart, as well as becoming his first number-one single on the Scottish Singles Chart, which at that point counted physical sales only. The song is also on his studio album Years of Refusal.

"My Dearest Love", the B-side of the Decca (#4780964) single, was written by Morrissey along with Alain Whyte, the two being responsible for lyrics and music respectively. The song was recorded in Los Angeles and produced by Oscar and BAFTA-winning composer Gustavo Santaolalla, responsible for Brokeback Mountain, Babel and The Motorcycle Diaries. The song received additional production by Jerry Finn, the man behind 2004’s You Are the Quarry.

== Track listing ==
CD: Decca / 4780965

1. "All You Need Is Me" (Morrissey, Jesse Tobias)
2. "Children in Pieces" (Morrissey, Tobias)

7": Decca / 4780964

1. "All You Need Is Me" (Morrissey, Tobias)
2. "My Dearest Love" (Morrissey, Alain Whyte)

7": Decca / 4780963

1. "All You Need Is Me" (Morrissey, Tobias)
2. "Drive-In Saturday" (David Bowie) (live Omaha 11 May 2007)

== Personnel ==
- Morrissey – vocals
- Boz Boorer – guitar
- Jesse Tobias – guitar
- Solomon Walker – bass guitar
- Matt Walker – drums
- Roger Manning – keyboard
- Michael Farrell – keyboard (B-sides only)
- Jerry Finn – producer

== Charts ==
Chart (2008)	Peak position
Scotland Singles (OCC)	1
UK Singles (OCC)	24
