= Different Days (The Charlatans album) =

Studio album by The Charlatans
- Released: 26 May 2017
- Recorded: 2016, Cheshire
- Genre: Indie rock; alternative rock
- Length: 45:13
- Label: BMG
- Producer: The Charlatans; Jim Spencer

The Charlatans chronology
Modern Nature (2015)	Different Days (2017)	We Are Love (2025)

Singles from Different Days
- 1. "Plastic Machinery" Released: 26 May 2017; 2. "Different Days" Released: 14 July 2017; 3. "Over Again" Released: 13 October 2017

Different Days is the thirteenth studio album by British alternative rock band The Charlatans, released on 26 May 2017.

The album features guest appearances from Paul Weller (who co-wrote "Spinning Out"), Gillian Gilbert and Stephen Morris (both from New Order), Johnny Marr, Peter Salisbury (The Verve), Donald Johnson (A Certain Ratio), Ian Rankin, and Sharon Horgan.

== Release ==
On 20 March 2017, Different Days was announced for release. "Plastic Machinery" was made available for streaming on 4 April. A music video was released for the track on 24 April; directed by Ewen Spencer, the clip was filmed in Barcelona, Spain. A remix of the song was done by Sleaford Mods and was made available for streaming on 25 May. Different Days was released on 26 May. On the same day, "Plastic Machinery" was released as a single. To promote the album's release, the band did two acoustic performances. The album was released in Japan through Hostess Entertainment on 2 June and included remixes of "Plastic Machinery" as bonus tracks. "Over Again" was released as a single on 13 October. In November and December, the group went on a headlining UK tour. On 8 December, a music video was released for "Over Again", directed by Ashley Shakibai. An EP, Totally Eclipsing, was released alongside a two-CD edition of the album on 8 June 2018. In September and October, the group went on a headlining North American tour. The album cover photo was taken in Barcelona.

== Reception ==
Professional ratings
Aggregate scores
Source	Rating
AnyDecentMusic?	6.8/10
Metacritic	74/100
Review scores
Source	Rating
AllMusic	3.5/5 stars
Clash	7/10
The Guardian	4/5 stars
The Independent	3/5 stars
The Irish Times	3/5 stars
The Line of Best Fit	7/10
Pitchfork	6/10
PopMatters	6/10 stars
The Times	4/5 stars
Under the Radar	7/10 stars

The album was described by David Barnett in The Independent as "possibly their most ambitious project yet". Dave Simpson, for The Guardian, gave it four stars and called it "their best album in 20 years". AllMusic writer Stephen Thomas Erlewine gave it three and a half stars, stating that the band "embrace the elastic possibilities of new avenues here, and the results are rewarding". Pitchfork's Robert Ham gave it 6.0 out of 10, calling it "good but not great". Richard Folland, for PopMatters, also gave it 6 out of 10, describing it as Modern Nature Part 2.

== Track listing ==
All tracks are written by The Charlatans unless stated otherwise.

No.	Title	Writer(s)	Length
1.	"Hey Sunrise"		4:14
2.	"Solutions"		4:07
3.	"Different Days"		4:01
4.	"Future Tense"	Ian Rankin	0:50
5.	"Plastic Machinery"		3:43
6.	"The Forgotten One"		0:41
7.	"Not Forgotten"		5:36
8.	"There Will Be Chances"		4:37
9.	"Over Again"		4:01
10.	"The Same House"		2:52
11.	"Let’s Go Together"		4:17
12.	"The Setting Sun"		1:38
13.	"Spinning Out"	Paul Weller, The Charlatans	4:36
Total length:			45:13

== Personnel ==
The Charlatans

- Tim Burgess – vocals
- Martin Blunt – bass guitar
- Mark Collins – guitar
- Tony Rogers – keyboards

Additional musicians

- Paul Weller – piano, percussion, vocals
- Gillian Gilbert – keyboards
- Stephen Morris – drums, programming
- Johnny Marr – guitar
- Anton Newcombe – guitar, percussion, keyboards
- Peter Salisbury – drums
- Ben Gordelier – drums
- Donald Johnson – percussion
- Derick Johnson – bass
- Ian Rankin – spoken word
- Kurt Wagner – spoken word
- Sharon Horgan – backing vocals
- Nik Void – backing vocals
- Shuri Endo – voice
