= I Just Want to See the Boy Happy =

Single by Morrissey

from the album Ringleader of the Tormentors
- B-side: "Sweetie-Pie"; "I Want the One I Can't Have"; "Speedway"; "Late Night Maudlin Street"
- Released: 4 December 2006; 22 January 2007 (12")
- Recorded: 2005
- Genre: Alternative rock
- Length: 2:59
- Label: Sanctuary Records
- Songwriter: Morrissey/Jesse Tobias
- Producer: Tony Visconti

Morrissey singles chronology
"In the Future When All's Well" (2006)	"I Just Want to See the Boy Happy" (2006)	"That's How People Grow Up" (2008)

"I Just Want to See the Boy Happy" is the fourth and final single from the album Ringleader of the Tormentors by Morrissey. The single was released on 4 December 2006. The title track was written by Morrissey and Jesse Tobias. Released the day after Morrissey began a five date arena tour in the UK, the single performed respectably, considering it was the fourth off the album, peaking at number 16 in the UK Singles Chart.

Described by NME as "Mozza at his mic-lead whipping best", the track received largely positive reviews, with the Manchester Evening News awarding it a 5/5 mark and declaring the song "reminiscent of his early work with the Smiths, this is an excellent single."

"A 12" picture disc of the track was released on 22 January 2007 which included all the B-sides on one disc and was limited to 1000 copies.

== Track listing ==
=== CD ===
1. "I Just Want to See the Boy Happy" (Morrissey/Jesse Tobias)
2. "Sweetie-Pie" (Morrissey/Michael Farrell)
3. "I Want the One I Can't Have" (live Royal Albert Hall 2002) (Morrissey/Johnny Marr)
4. "I Just Want to See the Boy Happy" (Video)

=== 7" #1 ===
1. "I Just Want to See the Boy Happy"
2. "Speedway" (live Royal Albert Hall 2002) (Morrissey/Boz Boorer)

=== 7" picture disc ===
1. "I Just Want to See the Boy Happy"
2. "Late Night Maudlin Street" (live Royal Albert Hall 2002) (Morrissey/Stephen Street)

=== 12" ===
1. "I Just Want to See the Boy Happy"
2. "Sweetie-Pie"
3. "I Want the One I Can't Have" (live Royal Albert Hall 2002)
4. "Speedway" (live Royal Albert Hall 2002)
5. "Late Night Maudlin Street" (live Royal Albert Hall 2002)

== Charts ==
Chart (2006)	Peak position
UK Singles (OCC)	16
UK Indie (OCC)	1

== Musicians ==
- Morrissey: voice
- Boz Boorer: guitar
- Jesse Tobias: guitar (only on studio tracks)
- Alain Whyte: guitar
- Gary Day: bass
- Michael Farrell: keyboard (only on studio tracks)
- Matt Chamberlain: drums (only on studio tracks)
- Dean Butterworth: drums (only on live tracks)
- Kristeen Young: backing vocals (on Sweetie-Pie)
