= In the Future When All's Well =

Single by Morrissey

from the album Ringleader of the Tormentors
- B-side: "Christian Dior"; "I'll Never Be Anybody's Hero Now"; "To Me You Are a Work of Art"
- Released: 21 August 2006
- Recorded: 2005
- Genre: Alternative rock
- Length: 3:54
- Label: Sanctuary
- Songwriters: Morrissey; Jesse Tobias
- Producer: Tony Visconti

Morrissey singles chronology
"The Youngest Was the Most Loved" (2006)	"In the Future When All's Well" (2006)	"I Just Want to See the Boy Happy" (2006)

"In the Future When All's Well" is a song by Morrissey, released as the third single from the album Ringleader of the Tormentors. It was added to XFM London's playlist on 18 August 2006, and also made BBC Radio 2's C-List and BBC 6 Music's A-List. The single was released internationally on 21 August 2006. It peaked at number 17 on the UK Singles Chart.

== Track listing ==
CD single 1

1. "In the Future When All's Well" (Morrissey/Tobias)
2. "Christian Dior" (Morrissey/Boorer)

CD single 2

1. "In the Future When All's Well" (Morrissey/Tobias)
2. "I'll Never Be Anybody's Hero Now" (Live at London Palladium) (Morrissey/Whyte)
3. "To Me You Are a Work of Art" (Live at London Palladium) (Morrissey/Whyte)
4. "In the Future When All's Well" (Video)

7"

1. "In the Future When All's Well" (Morrissey/Tobias)
2. "Christian Dior" (Morrissey/Boorer)

== Musicians ==
- Morrissey – vocals
- Boz Boorer – guitar
- Jesse Tobias – guitar
- Alain Whyte – guitar
- Gary Day – bass
- Michael Farrell – keyboard
- Matt Chamberlain – drums
- Matt Walker – drums (only on live tracks)
