= Ringleader of the Tormentors =

Studio album by Morrissey
- Released: 3 April 2006
- Recorded: September–November 2005
- Studio: Forum Music Village (Rome, Italy)
- Genre: Alternative rock
- Length: 50:05
- Label: Sanctuary; Attack
- Producer: Tony Visconti

Morrissey chronology
Live at Earls Court (2005)	Ringleader of the Tormentors (2006)	Greatest Hits (2008)

Singles from Ringleader of the Tormentors
- 1. "You Have Killed Me" Released: 27 March 2006; 2. "The Youngest Was the Most Loved" Released: 5 June 2006; 3. "In the Future When All's Well" Released: 21 August 2006; 4. "I Just Want to See the Boy Happy" Released: 3 December 2006

Ringleader of the Tormentors is the eighth studio album by the English alternative rock singer Morrissey. It was released on 3 April 2006 by Attack Records. The album was described as showcasing "a thicker, more rock-driven sound", which Morrissey attributed to new guitarist Jesse Tobias.

The album debuted at number 1 in the UK Albums Chart and number 27 in the US, and also reached number 1 in Sweden, Malta, and Greece.

== Recording and production ==
Recording for the album commenced in late August 2005 in Rome, Italy. Mixing began in late October 2005. Initially, Morrissey was to record the album with producer Jeff Saltzman; however, he could not undertake the project.

Producer Tony Visconti, of T. Rex and David Bowie fame, took over the production role and Morrissey announced that Ringleader of the Tormentors is to be "the most beautiful—perhaps the most gentle—so far". Visconti wrote on his website:

We have been working on the music and each day it just sounds better and better. I find every musician in the band a joy to work with. Morrissey's vocals are passionate and confident. Right now I'm at the mixing stage and most of the musicians have gone home. I am two-thirds of the way through one of the best albums I've ever worked on, with not only Morrissey at his best, but the plot has twists and turns which somehow involve film composer Ennio Morricone and an Italian children's choir. That should whet your appetite, you Moz fans, you!"

The musicians recording with Morrissey in Rome were Alain Whyte, Boz Boorer, Jesse Tobias, Gary Day, Michael Farrell and Matt Chamberlain. Chamberlain replaced Dean Butterworth, who decided to continue drumming for the band Good Charlotte. Marco Origel, from the San Francisco area, handled engineering on the album.

== Release ==
The album's opening track, "I Will See You in Far-off Places", was leaked on the internet on 2 February 2006.

"In the Future When All's Well" received some airplay in the United States on alternative rock radio.

Ringleader of the Tormentors was released on 3 April 2006. It became Morrissey's third number 1 album on the UK Albums Chart, selling 62,000 copies in its first week of release in the UK. It was also the first British album charting to include download sales, 1,200 of which were full album downloads of Ringleader of the Tormentors. The album peaked in its debut week at number 27 on the Billboard 200 in the U.S., and according to Nielsen SoundScan, has sold 98,000 in the U.S. as of August 2008.

== Reception ==
Professional ratings
Aggregate scores
Source	Rating
Metacritic	75/100
Review scores
Source	Rating
AllMusic	3/5 stars
Blender	4/5 stars
The Guardian	5/5 stars
The Independent	3/5 stars
NME	8/10
Pitchfork	8/10
Rolling Stone	3.5/5 stars
The Times	4/5 stars

Ringleader of the Tormentors received positive reviews from most critics. According to critic review aggregator Metacritic, the album received an average review score of 75/100, based on 34 critical reviews, indicating "Generally favorable reviews". Andy Gill of The Independent wrote "Musically, it's both tougher and lusher than You Are the Quarry, with proper orchestrations replacing that album's nasty synthetic strings." Stephen Thomas Erlewine of AllMusic wrote "it's easy to enjoy Ringleader of the Tormentors as merely an everyday Morrissey record, but it's hard not to shake the suspicion that this album is the closest he's ever been to forgettable."

== Track listing ==
No.	Title	Writer(s)	Length
1.	"I Will See You in Far-Off Places"	Morrissey, Alain Whyte	4:13
2.	"Dear God Please Help Me"	Morrissey, Whyte, Ennio Morricone	5:51
3.	"You Have Killed Me"	Morrissey, Jesse Tobias	3:08
4.	"The Youngest Was the Most Loved"	Morrissey, Tobias	2:59
5.	"In the Future When All's Well"	Morrissey, Tobias	3:54
6.	"The Father Who Must Be Killed"	Morrissey, Whyte	3:53
7.	"Life Is a Pigsty"	Morrissey, Whyte	7:22
8.	"I'll Never Be Anybody's Hero Now"	Morrissey, Whyte	4:14
9.	"On the Streets I Ran"	Morrissey, Tobias	3:51
10.	"To Me You Are a Work of Art"	Morrissey, Whyte	4:02
11.	"I Just Want to See the Boy Happy"	Morrissey, Tobias	2:59
12.	"At Last I Am Born"	Morrissey, Michael Farrell	3:33

== Personnel ==
- Morrissey – vocals
- Alain Whyte – guitar, backing vocals
- Boz Boorer – guitar
- Jesse Tobias – guitar
- Gary Day – bass guitar
- Matt Chamberlain – drums
- Michael Farrell – piano, organ, keyboards, trumpet, trombone, percussion

Additional personnel

- Ennio Morricone – string arrangement on "Dear God Please Help Me"

Children's choir on "The Youngest Was the Most Loved", "The Father Who Must Be Killed" and "At Last I Am Born"

- Laura Adriani
- Gaia e Andrea Baroni
- Niccolo Centioni
- Julia D'Andrea
- Alice e Ester Diodovich
- Marco Lorecchio
- Charlotte Patrignani

== Charts ==
Chart performance for Ringleader of the Tormentors
Chart (2006)	Peak position
Australian Albums (ARIA)	55
Austrian Albums (Ö3 Austria)	25
Belgian Albums (Ultratop Flanders)	9
Belgian Albums (Ultratop Wallonia)	49
Danish Albums (Hitlisten)	3
Dutch Albums (Album Top 100)	22
Finnish Albums (Suomen virallinen lista)	4
French Albums (SNEP)	38
German Albums (Offizielle Top 100)	9
Irish Albums (IRMA)	3
Italian Albums (FIMI)	15
Norwegian Albums (VG-lista)	2
Portuguese Albums (AFP)	22
Spanish Albums (Promusicae)	40
Swedish Albums (Sverigetopplistan)	1
Swiss Albums (Schweizer Hitparade)	44
UK Albums (OCC)	1
UK Independent Albums (OCC)	1
US Billboard 200	27

== Certifications and sales ==
Certifications for Ringleader of the Tormentors
Region	Certification	Certified units/sales
Denmark (IFPI Danmark)	Platinum	20,000^{^}
Ireland (IRMA)	Platinum	15,000^{^}
United Kingdom (BPI)	Gold	100,000^{^}
United States	—	98,000
^{^} Shipments figures based on certification alone.
