= You Have Killed Me =

2006 single by Morrissey

Single by Morrissey

from the album Ringleader of the Tormentors
- B-side: "Good Looking Man About Town"; "Human Being"; "I Knew I Was Next"
- Released: 27 March 2006
- Length: 3:08
- Label: Sanctuary, Attack
- Songwriters: Morrissey, Jesse Tobias
- Producer: Tony Visconti

Morrissey singles chronology
"There Is a Light That Never Goes Out" (live)/ "Redondo Beach" (2005)	"You Have Killed Me" (2006)	"The Youngest Was the Most Loved" (2006)

"You Have Killed Me" is the first single from English alternative rock singer Morrissey's eighth studio album, Ringleader of the Tormentors (2006). The single, written by Morrissey and Jesse Tobias, was released on 27 March 2006. Morrissey said it would showcase the "marked difference in sound" brought about by the new influence of Tobias on Morrissey's work while Billboard magazine described it as a "simple, effective first single". Upon its release, the song peaked at number three on the UK Singles Chart and reached the top 10 in Denmark, Finland, Ireland, and Sweden.

== Lyrical content ==
The lyric references Pier Paolo Pasolini's 1961 film, Accattone, about prostitution in the slums of Rome, as is shown in the first two lines of the lyrics ("Pasolini is me"/"Accattone you'll be"). There is much speculation as to the meaning of this quote. Some fans believe it is merely an example of Rome's influence on Morrissey, whereas others feel it is a reference to the loss of virginity, since Accattone is Pasolini's first film. A picture of Terence Stamp, main character of Pasolini's film Teorema, was also chosen by Morrissey as the cover of one of The Smiths' early singles, "What Difference Does It Make?".

The lyric also mentions Anna Magnani, Luchino Visconti, and in some live performances Fellini. The references to Anna Magnani and Luchino Visconti probably refer to Visconti's segment of the anthology film Siamo Donne, in which actresses are shown in their everyday lives, rather than as glamorous or sexualised. Anna Magnani frequently portrayed ordinary women who sacrificed everything for her family, as in Visconti's Bellissima or Pasolini's Mamma Roma.

== Track listings ==
UK CD1 and 7-inch single

1. "You Have Killed Me" (Morrissey, Jesse Tobias) – 3:08
2. "Good Looking Man About Town" (Morrissey, Alain Whyte) – 2:53

UK CD2

1. "You Have Killed Me" (Morrissey, Tobias) – 3:08
2. "Human Being" (David Johansen, Johnny Thunders) – 6:08
3. "I Knew I Was Next" (Morrissey, Tobias) – 3:46
4. "You Have Killed Me" (video)

US CD single

1. "You Have Killed Me" (Morrissey, Tobias) – 3:08
2. "Human Being" (Johansen, Thunders) – 6:08
3. "I Knew I Was Next" (Morrissey, Tobias) – 3:46
4. "Good Looking Man About Town" (Morrissey, Whyte) – 2:53

== Personnel ==
- Morrissey: voice
- Boz Boorer: guitar
- Jesse Tobias: guitar
- Alain Whyte: guitar
- Gary Day: bass
- Michael Farrell: keyboard
- Matt Chamberlain: drums

== Charts ==
Chart (2006)	Peak position
Denmark (Tracklisten)	3
Europe (Eurochart Hot 100)	12
Finland (Suomen virallinen lista)	5
France (SNEP)	69
Germany (GfK)	65
Ireland (IRMA)	9
Italy (FIMI)	22
Netherlands (Single Top 100)	58
Scotland Singles (OCC)	2
Sweden (Sverigetopplistan)	8
UK Singles (OCC)	3
UK Indie (OCC)	1

== Release history ==
Region	Date	Format(s)	Label(s)	Ref.
United States	27 February 2006	Triple A; alternative radio	Sanctuary; Attack	
Australia	27 March 2006	7-inch vinyl; CD	Sanctuary; Attack	
United Kingdom	27 March 2006	CD	Sanctuary; Attack	
