= Jesse Tobias =

American guitarist (born 1972)

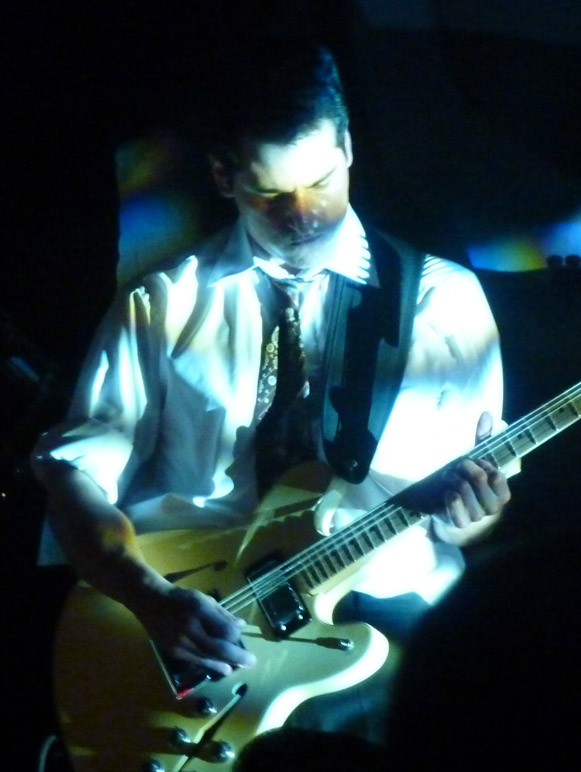
- Tobias in 2011

Background information
- Born: April 1, 1972 (age 54); Austin, Texas, U.S.
- Genres: Alternative rock
- Occupations: Musician, songwriter, record producer, arranger
- Instrument: Guitar
- Years active: 1990–present

Jesse Tobias (born April 1, 1972) is an American musician who has been the lead guitarist and co-songwriter for Morrissey since 2004. Tobias first gained fame during a brief tenure with the Red Hot Chili Peppers in 1993, although he was replaced by Dave Navarro within a month after joining the band. Before he joined the Chili Peppers, he briefly played with the band Mother Tongue. In 1995, Tobias joined the touring band for Alanis Morissette, and from 1999 to 2005 he was a member of the musical duo Splendid alongside his then-wife Angie Hart.

== Life and career ==
In 1990, Tobias formed the band Mother Tongue in Austin, Texas. They were signed to a record label in 1992. Anthony Kiedis of the Red Hot Chili Peppers spotted Tobias and Mother Tongue in a local nightclub, while they were looking for guitar player to replace John Frusciante. Dave Navarro had recently turned them down.

Kiedis felt that Tobias had what the band was looking for and after months of long auditions (in which the band took out an ad in the newspaper), Tobias was on board as the new guitarist for the Chili Peppers. Tobias and the Peppers began writing for the next record; however, while the band felt Tobias was a great guitarist, the connection just wasn't there between Jesse and the other three, especially bassist Flea. At this time, Dave Navarro suddenly made himself available and the band fired Tobias, Kiedis saying that it would have happened regardless of Navarro becoming available. The band felt bad that they pulled Tobias away from a band he just joined only to fire him a month later.

Tobias would resurface two years later with Alanis Morissette and would be her guitarist on her Jagged Little Pill world tour. While he was on tour with Morissette in 1996, he met Angie Hart, whose band Frente! was Morissette's opening act. The two were married in 1997 and moved to Los Angeles. Tobias continued to work as a session player, touring guitarist and in other non-performing roles in the music industry. The pair formed their own band, Splendid, which released an album in 1999. The album's release was largely received only in Australia; and the band's American exposure was mostly due only to their association with Joss Whedon, creator of Buffy the Vampire Slayer, including on-camera appearances when Splendid performed at The Bronze, the fictional nightclub featured in the series. Tobias was credited as a producer (with Christophe Beck and Whedon) and with arranging the music (with Beck) for "Once More, with Feeling", the musical episode from Whedon's show's sixth season. Hart and Tobias ended their marriage in divorce in early 2005.

Tobias joined Morrissey's touring band in 2004 after the illness of Alain Whyte and eventually became a permanent member of the group, having appeared on all studio recordings and live gigs since. He has also co-written several top-charting singles for Morrissey which includes "You Have Killed Me", "In The Future When All's Well", and "All You Need Is Me".

In 2020, Tobias worked with Morrissey on his upcoming album Bonfire of Teenagers, which was due to be released in February 2023, but in December 2022, it was announced that Capitol Records had backed out of the deal. The fate of the album is unknown.

== Discography ==
with Alanis Morissette

- Jagged Little Pill, Live (1997)

with Splendid

- "Less Than Zero" (1999)
- Have You Got A Name For It (1999)
- "Come Clean" (1999)
- States of Awake EP (2004)

with Morrissey

- Live at Earls Court (2005)
- Ringleader of the Tormentors (2006)
- Years of Refusal (2009)
- Greatest Hits (2008)
- Swords (2009)
- Morrissey: 25 Live (2013)
- World Peace Is None of Your Business (2014)
- Low in High School (2017)
- California Son (2019)
- I Am Not a Dog on a Chain (2020)
- Make-Up Is a Lie (2026)
- Bonfire of Teenagers (unreleased)

other appearances

- "Once More, with Feeling" by Jesse Tobias with Christophe Beck

=== Songwriting credits with Morrissey ===
- "You Have Killed Me", "The Youngest Was the Most Loved", "In The Future When All's Well", "On the Streets I Ran" and "I Just Want to See the Boy Happy" from Ringleader of the Tormentors
- "All You Need Is Me", "Sorry Doesn't Help" and "I'm OK by Myself" from Years of Refusal
- "I Knew I Was Next", "If You Don't Like Me, Don't Look at Me" and Children in Pieces" from Swords
- "I'm Not a Man", "The Bullfighter Dies", "Kiss Me a Lot", "Smiler with Knife" and "Kick the Bride Down the Aisle" from World Peace Is None of Your Business – "Forgive Someone" (only on deluxe version)
- "I Bury The Living" and "When You Open Your Legs" from Low in High School
- "Jim Jim Falls", "I Am Not a Dog On a Chain", "What Kind of People Live in These Houses?", "Knockabout World", "Once I Saw the River Clean" and "My Hurling Days Are Done" from I Am Not a Dog on a Chain
- "I Am Veronica", "Kerouac's Crack", "Ha Ha Harlem", "I Live in Oblivion", "Bonfire of Teenagers", "My Funeral", "I Ex-Love You", "Sure Enough, the Telephone Rings" and "Saint in a Stained Glass Window" from Bonfire of Teenagers
- "Zoom Zoom the Little Boy" and "The Night Pop Dropped" from Make-Up Is a Lie
- "People Are the Same Everywhere" and "I Thought You Were Dead" are tracks that appeared on B-sides of Morrissey singles.
- "By The Time I Get To Wherever I'm Going", "Once Upon a Woman's Body" and "You Don't Need Their Approval" are unreleased tracks.
