= Michael Farrell (musician) =

American musician

- Born: Michael Kevin Farrell; Cleveland, Ohio, United States
- Genres: Pop, rock and roll
- Occupations: Keyboardist, composer, record producer
- Years active: 1993–present
- Label: Sanctuary Records
- Website: www.MichaelKevinFarrell.com

Michael Kevin Farrell is an American keyboardist, musical director, songwriter and multi-instrumentalist, best known for his work both recording and touring with Alanis Morissette, Morrissey and Macy Gray.

== Early life ==
Farrell was born and grew up in Cleveland, Ohio. He attended John Carroll University where he won a Fulbright Fellowship to study at the University of Waikato New Zealand in 1991. He later received a master's degree from Syracuse University in 1993. After college, he moved to Los Angeles in 1993 to pursue music.

== Macy Gray ==
Farrell was the musical director/keyboardist for Grammy winning artist Macy Gray. Farrell and Gray opened for David Bowie for 6 weeks at the end of 2003. Though he isn't a member of her band, Farrell still collaborates with Gray as a writer having contributed original material to her 2007 release, Big, produced by will.i.am of The Black Eyed Peas. They also recently recorded original material for ABC's Desperate Housewives soundtrack.

== Morrissey ==
In 2004, Farrell joined Morrissey's band on the world tour in support of his platinum album You Are the Quarry. That tour featured worldwide festival and headline dates, including the Glastonbury Festival and the KROQ Inland Invasion. Subsequently, Farrell was the featured keyboardist and percussionist on the album Live at Earls Court (where he is erroneously billed as 'Mikey V. Farrell), the "Let Me Kiss You" and "I Have Forgiven Jesus" single B-sides and the live concert DVD, Who Put the M in Manchester?.

In the fall of 2005, Farrell recorded with Morrissey for his eight studio album Ringleader of the Tormentors. The album, recorded in Rome, was produced by the famed Tony Visconti. Farrell co-wrote two songs for those sessions; "At Last I Am Born" and "Sweetie-Pie", and played keyboards, percussion, guitar, trumpet and trombone. In support of the album, the band spent the summer of 2006 performing festival dates in Italy, Turkey, Germany, Holland, Croatia, Finland, Portugal, Switzerland, Hungary, Austria, France, and Spain.

After completing a comprehensive US, UK and European tour in support of Morrissey's Greatest Hits album in 2007, Farrell decided to leave the band to spend more time with his family. However, an earlier single recorded with Farrell, "That's How People Grow Up", appears on Morrissey's subsequent (2009) album Years of Refusal.

== Other work ==
In recent years, Farrell has increasingly been working in the studio in a variety of capacities, as a session keyboardist and multi-instrumentalist, a mixer, and as a songwriter and producer. Farrell has constructed his own studio in Burbank where he has written and produced tracks for Morrissey, Macy Gray, Jeremy Gregory, Ben Lee, Michael Orland of American Idol, and Angie Hart. As a film composer, he has scored the Sundance Channel film "Paradise, Nebraska", the award-winning short-film "Beat", and the children's TV pilot "The Mighty Me Superhero Hour". He has also written a song for the HBO feature film "Girl" and contributed music to the NBC sitcom "Men Behaving Badly". Farrell has also performed on shows such as Third Rock from the Sun, Grounded for Life, and Buffy the Vampire Slayer.

Farrell has toured with other artists such as Vanessa Carlton, Alanis Morissette and Vanessa Brown, with whom he played keyboards and guitar. At various times he has also shared the stage with Mariah Carey, Melissa Etheridge, Lee "Scratch" Perry, Ruben Studdard, Dave Navarro and Camp Freddy, RuPaul, Ben Lee, Kimberly Locke, Anthony Rapp, Sally Kellerman, Jean Smart, Neil Patrick Harris, Scott Record, and Dan Finnerty and the Dan Band. More recently, he has played keyboards on the Alanis Morissette The Guardian Angel Tour, European, North and South American Tour, in 2012. In 2014, he toured with Richie Sambora in Australia and Europe.
