= The Smiths Singles Box =

Box set by the Smiths
- Released: 8 December 2008
- Recorded: 1983–1987
- Genres: Alternative rock, indie pop
- Length: 84:44
- Label: Rhino UK
- Producer: Various

The Smiths chronology
The Sound of The Smiths (2008)	The Smiths Singles Box (2008)	Complete (2011)

The Smiths Singles Box is a limited edition box set compilation of 45 RPM 7-inch single releases by the English rock band the Smiths. It contains repressings of the Smiths' first ten 7-inch singles released in the United Kingdom between May 1983 through May 1986, as well as the Dutch-only single for "The Headmaster Ritual" and the DJ promotional single of "Still Ill", housed in reproductions of their original picture sleeves. The box also includes a 14×14 poster of the single sleeves, four collector's pins and a download code for the mp3 versions. It was released on 8 December 2008 in the UK.

A compact disc version of the box set was issued on 22 June 2009 and featured a different track selection, largely reproducing the expanded track listings of the original 12-inch singles.

The cover of the box features actor Joel Fabiani, taken from the TV series Department S and selected by Smiths frontman Morrissey.

== Track listing ==
All songs written by Morrissey/Johnny Marr

=== 7" Version ===
7" 1

1. "Hand in Glove" - 3:16
2. "Handsome Devil" (Live) - 2:56

7" 2

1. "This Charming Man" - 2:43
2. "Jeane" - 3:04

7" 3

1. "What Difference Does It Make?" - 3:26
2. "Back to the Old House" - 3:05

7" 4

1. "Still Ill" - 3:22
2. "You've Got Everything Now" - 3:59

7" 5

1. "Heaven Knows I'm Miserable Now" - 3:36
2. "Suffer Little Children" - 5:27

7" 6

1. "William, It Was Really Nothing" - 2:11
2. "Please, Please, Please, Let Me Get What I Want" - 1:52

7" 7

1. "How Soon Is Now?" - 3:41
2. "Well I Wonder" - 4:00

7" 8

1. "Shakespeare's Sister" - 2:09
2. "What She Said" - 2:40

7" 9

1. "The Headmaster Ritual" - 4:54
2. "Oscillate Wildly" - 3:28

7" 10

1. "That Joke Isn't Funny Anymore" - 3:52
2. "Meat Is Murder" (Live) - 5:40

7" 11

1. "The Boy with the Thorn in His Side" - 3:18
2. "Asleep" - 4:10

7" 12

1. "Bigmouth Strikes Again" - 3:14
2. "Money Changes Everything" - 4:41

=== CD version ===
CD 1

1. "Hand in Glove" - 3:17
2. "Handsome Devil" (Live) - 2:53

CD 2

1. "This Charming Man" (Manchester) - 2:42
2. "This Charming Man" (London) - 2:46
3. "Accept Yourself" - 3:58
4. "Wonderful Woman" - 3:08
5. "Jeane" - 3:02

CD 3

1. "This Charming Man" (New York Vocal) - 5:34
2. "This Charming Man" (New York Instrumental) - 4:18

CD 4

1. "What Difference Does It Make?" - 3:34
2. "Back to the Old House" - 3:04
3. "These Things Take Time" - 2:24

CD 5

1. "Heaven Knows I'm Miserable Now" - 3:34
2. "Girl Afraid" - 2:44
3. "Suffer Little Children" - 5:27

CD 6

1. "William, It Was Really Nothing" - 2:10
2. "How Soon Is Now?" - 3:41
3. "Please, Please, Please, Let Me Get What I Want" - 1:50

CD 7

1. "How Soon Is Now?" - 6:43
2. "Well I Wonder" - 4:32
3. "Oscillate Wildly" - 3:26

CD 8

1. "Shakespeare's Sister" - 2:09
2. "What She Said" - 3:13
3. "Stretch Out and Wait" - 2:37

CD 9

1. "Barbarism Begins at Home" - 3:49
2. "Shakespeare's Sister" - 2:09
3. "Stretch Out and Wait" - 2:37

CD 10

1. "That Joke Isn't Funny Anymore" - 4:57
2. "Nowhere Fast" (Live) - 2:31
3. "Stretch Out and Wait" (Live) - 2:49
4. "Shakespeare's Sister" (Live) - 2:12
5. "Meat Is Murder" (Live) - 5:34

CD 11

1. "The Boy with the Thorn in His Side" - 3:17
2. "Rubber Ring" - 3:55
3. "Asleep" - 4:10

CD 12

1. "Bigmouth Strikes Again" - 3:12
2. "Money Changes Everything" - 4:40
3. "Unloveable" - 3:54
