= Steve Cox (artist) =

English Australian artist and writer

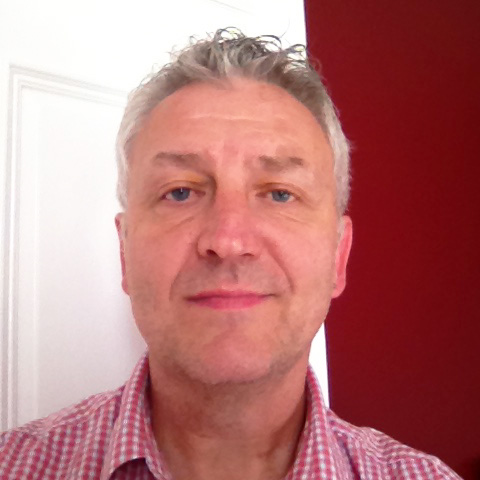
- Born: Steven Martin Cox; 1958 (age 67–68); Harringay, London, England
- Education: Victorian College of the Arts
- Known for: Predominantly watercolour, gouache, ink, collage on paper.

Steven Martin Cox (born 1958) is an English Australian artist and writer, known for his homoerotic images; stream of consciousness landscapes and animal/human hybrids. He writes art-related and queer-related articles and reviews for various publications.

== Early life and education ==
Cox was born in Harringay, London, England and arrived in Melbourne, Australia in 1968, when his family emigrated. He studied painting at the Victorian College of the Arts from 1978 to 1980, where one of his main lecturers was Gareth Sansom. In 1983 he was awarded the Keith & Elisabeth Murdoch Travelling Fellowship and subsequently spent eighteen months making work in London and Cairo. Also in 1983, he was included in the important survey of Australian art, Perspecta, at the Art Gallery of New South Wales. In 1989 he was awarded an Australia Council grant to spend three months making work at the Villa Ghedini, in Besozzo, Northern Italy. In 1997, Cox completed a master's degree in Fine Art at Deakin University; his thesis, which was in two parts: the first centred around the notion of a causal link between the creative act of the artist and the destructive act of the serial murderer; the second researched the life, work and death of British playwright Joe Orton.

Cox has written numerous essays and articles on the suppression of homo-eroticism in western art since the Renaissance, and the ways in which artists have managed to circumvent this censure.

== Career ==
His early work dealt with the aberrant psychology of murderers and their victims. In 1987 he staged an exhibition of paintings, 'Beyond Belief', which documented the crimes of the 1960s British Moors murderers. The show was largely based upon the 1967 book by Emlyn Williams, Beyond Belief: A Chronicle of Murder and its Detection. Over the years, the artist has obsessively collected more than a dozen copies of the book, in both hardback and paperback versions. Cox has also exhibited paintings of the serial killers Dennis Nilsen, Peter Manuel, and Peter Kurten amongst others - the latter work being acquired for the permanent collection of the National Gallery of Victoria, Melbourne.

In 1995, his exhibition Kinderspiel (Child’s Play) dealt exclusively with the subject of children who kill other children. His 1996 Masters Thesis (Deakin University), titled ‘Murder and Art: the Causal Links’, drew parallels between the creative mind of the artist and the murderous mind of the serial killer.

Cox has explored the phenomena of dance culture, a subject that has spawned five exhibitions of portraits of clubbers, party-drug takers and bouncers, most notably in Rave: Club Culture (2000), Ecstasy: a celebration (2000) and Confessions of a Raving Lunatic (2002).

As an out gay artist, Cox has often featured homoeroticism within his work. His exhibition Testosterone Zone (1996) dealt with, amongst other things, frank male nudity and the still-existing taboo over public representations of male genitalia. To this end, he has always been outspoken against censorship in the arts, as seen in an interview in issue 11 of Artist Profile magazine (2010). and Cox's article, commissioned by The Guardian.

For decades, Cox's imagery has often been surreal, using unsettling juxtapositions of symbols. In The New Agrarian (1991), a partially nude boxer spars alone in front of a blackboard in an otherwise empty field. In Jelly Kitten (2005) a cartoon cat's head is simultaneously a portrait of a cute children's cartoon character and a tormented mind, perhaps reminiscent of Sidney Nolan's Gallipoli series, which featured portraits of returned soldiers.

In 2016, Cox was commissioned to paint a massive mural on the wall of the restaurant, Grub Food Van, in Fitzroy, Melbourne. He based this major work on Titian's Bacchus and Ariadne, in the National Gallery, London.

== Exhibitions ==
Since 1982 he has staged over thirty-five one-person exhibitions in Melbourne, Sydney and Adelaide, and has participated in over fifty group-exhibitions, including Moist: Australian Watercolours, (2005) at the National Gallery of Australia, Canberra, and This and Other Worlds, (2005) at the National Gallery of Victoria, Melbourne. In 2008 he was included in True Crime: Murder and Misdemeanour in Australian Art, at the Geelong Art Gallery.

== See also ==
- Visual arts of Australia
