= Hand in Glove =

1983 single by The Smiths

Single by the Smiths

from the album The Smiths
- B-side: "Handsome Devil" (live)
- Written: January 1983
- Released: 13 May 1983
- Recorded: 27 February 1983
- Studio: Strawberry, Stockport, England
- Genre: Folk punk
- Length: 3:13 (single version); 3:25 (album version)
- Label: Rough Trade
- Composer: Johnny Marr
- Lyricist: Morrissey
- Producer: The Smiths

The Smiths singles chronology
| "Hand in Glove" (1983) | "This Charming Man" (1983) |

"Hand in Glove" is the debut single by English rock band the Smiths, written by singer Morrissey and guitarist Johnny Marr. It was released in May 1983 on independent record label Rough Trade. It peaked at No. 3 on the UK Indie Chart but did not make the UK Singles Chart.

A remixed version of the song was featured on the band's self-titled debut album in 1984. That same year, a cover version recorded by singer Sandie Shaw featuring Smiths members Marr, Andy Rourke and Mike Joyce as backing musicians reached No. 27 on the UK Singles Chart. The Smiths' original single mix was included on the compilation albums Hatful Of Hollow, also released in 1984, and Louder Than Bombs, released in 1987.

== Background and recording ==
"Hand in Glove" was written by Morrissey and Marr in January 1983. By that date, they had been working together for around eight months, had written more than ten songs together, and had recorded two demo tapes, but had been rejected by both Factory and EMI. Their usual composition method was for Marr to add music to Morrissey's lyrics, though for "Hand in Glove", Marr had the music first - he developed the chords on an acoustic guitar while at his parents' house. Unable to record the music there, Marr's girlfriend Angie drove him to Morrissey's house while he continued to strum the guitar, altering it with suggestions from Angie. At Morrissey's house, the tune was recorded on a cassette tape. Morrissey said that he wrote lyrics for it in the span of two hours. Even prior to performing the song live, the group was unanimous in the opinion that "Hand in Glove" was their strongest song to date.

The Smiths asked their manager Joe Moss to fund the recording of "Hand in Glove". In late February, the group booked a one-day recording session at Strawberry Studios in Stockport at the cost of £250, which they produced themselves. Morrissey claimed in later years that he was dissatisfied with his vocal and returned a week later to re-record his part, the day after which the entire group travelled to London and convinced Rough Trade owner Geoff Travis to release the record. However, author Simon Goddard noted that it was not until April 1983 that Marr and bassist Andy Rourke visited the Rough Trade offices. On that occasion, Marr handed Travis a cassette featuring "Hand in Glove" and a live recording of "Handsome Devil", telling Travis, "[L]isten to this, it's not just another tape". Impressed, Travis promised he would. The following Monday, Travis called the group and invited them back to London to release "Hand in Glove" as a single. Both parties agreed to release the single as a temporary arrangement before agreeing to any long-term partnership.

Two months after the single's release, the Smiths recorded the song again during aborted sessions for their debut album with producer Troy Tate. This version was recorded a tone lower than the original in the key of F♯ minor, and features a shorter introduction. The Smiths recorded the song again with producer John Porter in October at Manchester's Pluto Studios. Morrissey rejected this version of the song. Due to impending deadlines, the version that ultimately appeared on the band's first album The Smiths was a remix of the original master recording from the Strawberry Studios session. For this version, Porter increased the separation between Marr's guitar tracks and Morrissey's vocals, emphasised drummer Mike Joyce's drum beat, pushed Rourke's bass back in the mix, and created a more dramatic opening and conclusion to the song.

== Composition and lyrics ==
The original recorded version of "Hand in Glove" is in the key of G minor. The song begins with an overdub of Marr playing a harmonica over the rest of the music. Simon Goddard wrote that Marr's use of the instrument "purposefully evoked the very same 'blunt vitality of working-class northernness' that Ian MacDonald attributes to The Beatles' parallel 1962 single 'Love Me Do', though infinitely more melancholy." Of the backing music, Goddard wrote, "Marr's redolent minor chord wash weeps with a rain-soaked hopelessness while Rourke contributes one of his most inspired bass patterns".

Morrissey explained that the song's theme was "complete loneliness," going on to state: "It was important to me that there'd be something searingly poetic about it, in a lyrical sense, and yet jubilant at the same time." Goddard described "Hand in Glove" as "a bleak proclamation of doomed happiness [...] a shattering left-hook of self-loathing, loss and desperation". Years later, Morrissey considered the song to be the group's "most special". The singer said he was particularly proud of the song's second verse, which included the lines "Though we may be hidden by rags/We have something they'll never have." Morrissey explained that the verse described "how I felt when I couldn't afford clothes and used to dress in rags but I didn't really feel mentally impoverished."

In the song's lyrics, Morrissey referenced works by playwright Shelagh Delaney, whom he would reference in several later songs. The song's line "I'll probably never see you again" appears in Delaney's kitchen sink realism play A Taste of Honey and The Lion in Love. Morrissey paraphrased the line "Everything depends upon how near you stand next to me" from the 1974 Leonard Cohen song "Take This Longing". Goddard conjectures that the song's title was inspired by the 1947 detective novel Hand in Glove by Ngaio Marsh. The lyrics are also quoted in the coda of "Pretty Girls Make Graves", another song from the band's first album.

== Release and reception ==
"Hand in Glove" was released as the Smiths' debut recording in May 1983. The single sold consistently for the next 18 months. Although the single failed to reach the UK Singles Chart, it reached number three on the UK Indie Chart. Its relative success earned the group a listing in the Guinness Book of Records in January 1984 when it and the group's next two singles, "This Charming Man" and "What Difference Does It Make?", held the top three position on the UK Indie Chart. "It should have been a massive hit", Morrissey later said, "it was so urgent. To me, it was a complete cry in every direction. It really was a landmark." The single did raise the band's profile; a week after its release the band gained their first major live reviews in the music press, which in turn led to their first radio session with BBC Radio 1 disc jockey John Peel.

While reviewing a 1983 concert by the Smiths and the Go-Betweens at The Venue in London, Barney Hoskyns, writing for the NME, described "Hand in Glove" as "one of the year's few masterpieces, a thing of beauty and a joy forever". In the 1984 edition of The Rock Yearbook, Hoskyns said the song "swept into my heart". Bill Black, writing for Sounds, described it as a "daunting" debut. Writing for AllMusic, Ned Raggett called the song a "stunning, surprising debut" and describes the music as "sparkling", highlighting Marr's "careful overdubbing of acoustic and electric guitars". He also described Rourke's bass and Joyce's drumming as "sparse but effective", and said that Joyce "especially shone".

Stephen Thomas Erlewine, senior editor for AllMusic, said that the lyrics of "Hand in Glove" contain "veiled references to homosexuality".

Noel Gallagher selected the song as his fourth Desert Island Disc during his 2015 appearance on the show, on which he described it as "one of the greatest songs ever written".

== Packaging ==
Morrissey had specific instructions on how he wanted the "Hand in Glove" single to be packaged. He told Rough Trade's art department that the single should have a paper label centre with four vents encircling the middle, in homage to singles from the 1960s. The cover to the single features a photograph of George O'Mara by Lou Thomas or Jim French, taken from Margaret Walters' history The Nude Male. The sleeve's homoerotic undertones elicited the reaction Morrissey was hoping for of unease and outrage. Rourke said when he showed the recording to his parents his father was "mortified. He said to me, 'that's a bloke's bum' and I said, 'yeah' but when he asked me why I just didn't have an answer for him".

== Track listing ==
Both songs written by Morrissey and Johnny Marr.

1. "Hand in Glove" – 3:16
2. "Handsome Devil" (live, Manchester Hacienda, 4/2/83) – 2:53

== Personnel ==
- Morrissey – vocals
- Johnny Marr – electric and acoustic guitar, harmonica
- Andy Rourke – bass guitar
- Mike Joyce – drums, tambourine

== Etchings on vinyl ==
British 7-inch: KISS MY SHADES/KISS MY SHADES TOO

"Kiss my shades" is a lyric from the title track.

== Sandie Shaw collaboration ==
"Hand in Glove"

Single by Sandie Shaw
- B-side: "I Don't Owe You Anything"
- Released: 9 April 1984
- Recorded: February 1984
- Label: Rough Trade
- Songwriters: Morrissey, Johnny Marr
- Producer: John Porter

Sandie Shaw singles chronology
| "Wish I Was" (1983) | "Hand in Glove" (1984) | "Are You Ready to Be Heartbroken" (1986) |

Despite having established themselves as a group, Morrissey and Marr still harboured ambitions that they would be recognised as songwriters by having their songs covered by others. Their top choice was singer Sandie Shaw, of whom Morrissey was a fan, and who had scored several hits throughout the 1960s and was one of the most prominent British vocalists of her era. In the summer of 1983, Marr and Morrissey began asking Shaw to cover their song "I Don't Owe You Anything", which they had conceived with her in mind to perform. The pair sent Shaw various letters coupled with song demos. Shaw was sceptical at first; she was discouraged by the negative media attention that accompanied the Smiths song "Reel Around the Fountain", and when she received a copy of "Hand in Glove" in the mail, she reportedly exclaimed to her husband "he's started sending me pictures of naked men with their bums showing!"

Shaw was eventually won over by the intervention of Geoff Travis and by Morrissey's praise of her in the press. In January 1984, NME announced that Shaw and the Smiths would release a collaborative recording of "I Don't Owe You Anything" as a single on Rough Trade. In February, Shaw and the Smiths journeyed to Matrix Studios in London, where Shaw recorded three Smiths songs with Marr, Joyce and Rourke. The version of "Hand in Glove" recorded at Matrix was performed in the key of D minor, while Marr placed the intro riff's accent on a major scale and Shaw altered some lyrics. Shaw ended up selecting their recording of "Hand in Glove" as the single's A-side, placing "I Don't Owe You Anything" as the B-side. The cover features a still of Rita Tushingham from the movie A Taste of Honey, an adaptation of the play of the same name that was written by Shelagh Delaney, who appeared on the covers of the single "Girlfriend In a Coma" and the compilation album Louder Than Bombs.

Released as a single in April 1984 solely under Shaw's name, the recording became Shaw's first hit in a decade when it reached number 27 on the UK Singles Chart. Marr, Rourke and Joyce backed Shaw on two mimed television performances of the song, first on Channel 4's Earsay in March 1984, and then on Top of the Pops on 26 April, where the band appeared barefoot in homage to the singer, who did so often in the 1960s.

=== Track listing ===
- 7-inch
1. "Hand in Glove" – 2:58
2. "I Don't Owe You Anything" – 4:06
- 12-inch
1. "Hand in Glove" – 2:58
2. "I Don't Owe You Anything" – 4:06
3. "Jeane" – 2:52

=== Etchings on vinyl ===
British 7-inch: KISS MY SHADES/JM

=== Charts ===
| Chart (1984) | Peak position |
|---|---|
| Ireland (IRMA) | 13 |
| UK Singles (The Official Charts Company) | 27 |
| UK Indie Chart | 1 |
