= Beyond Belief: A Chronicle of Murder and Its Detection =

Book by Emlyn Williams

Book cover of Beyond Belief: A Chronicle of Murder and Its Detection by Emlyn Williams

Beyond Belief: A Chronicle of Murder and its Detection (London: Hamish Hamilton, 1967) (1968 paperback: ISBN 978-0-330-02088-6) is a semi-fictionalized account of the Moors murderers, Ian Brady and Myra Hindley, by the Welsh author and playwright, Emlyn Williams. As such, it may be classified as a nonfiction novel.

== Literary genre and style ==
First published in 1967, a year after the Moors murderers were sentenced to life imprisonment, the book is a mixture of reportage, speculation, literary allusions, and stream-of-consciousness writing—with phonetically rendered dialogue and eye dialect used to reflect the heavy regional accents and speech idioms of the working class milieu in Manchester and Glasgow. Williams also makes use of interior monologues to suggest possible explanations as to the killers' motives and state of mind leading up to their crimes.

The book has much in common with the genre of writing known as New Journalism since it narrates an actual murder case through the author's own creative interpretations and idiosyncratic literary style. In this sense, Beyond Belief can be considered a "nonfiction novel" in the manner of Meyer Levin's 1956 book Compulsion (about the Leopold and Loeb case) and Truman Capote's 1966 masterpiece In Cold Blood (about the Clutter murders). (Ironically, Compulsion was one of Brady's favorite books, which he gave Hindley to read shortly after they began their relationship in December 1961.)

The book's chapters begin with epigraphs from other sources that are not always relevant to the murders, chosen by Williams in an attempt to evoke the mood in working-class Britain at that time. An example: for one chapter dealing with the murder spree itself, Williams quotes the Dave Clark Five song "Catch Us If You Can"—as if these words described the murderers' attitude at the time.

== Criticism ==
As a work of literature, critics have not held Beyond Belief in the same high esteem as other crime-related nonfiction novels like In Cold Blood or Norman Mailer's The Executioner's Song (1980). Indeed, the book seems to have fallen out of favor because many of Emlyn Williams' suggestions and theories about the Moors murders have since been disproven in subsequent years.

Williams' florid prose style, questionable characterizations, and frequent discretionary editorializations on the events (both proven and alleged) have come to be regarded as overly speculative and sensationalistic, as well as rather quaintly stereotypical and dated. That the author had minimal contact with most of the individuals involved in the case—and had therefore seen fit to invent fictitious scenes and dialogue, and embellish certain details to account for what was not publicly known at the time—has also been a source of criticism. However he did spend valuable research time with David Smith and his wife (Hindley's sister)—this is referred to in the recent book Evil Relations by Carol Ann Lee.

== Public reception and influence ==
Beyond Belief was a bestseller in Britain in the years following its publication and was a main selection of the Book-of-the-Month Club in the United States. It has been reported that Myra Hindley strongly objected to Emlyn Williams' account of her relationship with Ian Brady, and that during the early years of her sentence, she implored friends and family not to read the book.

The book is mentioned by the character Amyl Nitrate (played by Jordan) at the beginning of Derek Jarman's punk-themed cult movie Jubilee (1977). It was also the source for much of the detail mentioned in the song "Suffer Little Children" (1984) by the Manchester pop group The Smiths. Smiths frontman Morrissey was a fan of the book, and it has been suggested that the book's frequent references to David and Maureen Smith (who ultimately were responsible for leading the police to the murderers) as "the Smiths" inspired the band's name. The book is also cited by Alan Moore as part of the source material for his Eisner Award-winning graphic novel From Hell, specifically inspiring a brief scene in which Hindley and Brady are depicted attending a film about Jack the Ripper.
