= Suffer Little Children =

Single by the Smiths

from the album The Smiths
- A-side: "Heaven Knows I'm Miserable Now"
- Released: 20 February 1984
- Recorded: October 1983
- Studio: Pluto (Manchester); Eden (London)
- Genre: Indie pop
- Length: 5:28
- Label: Rough Trade
- Composer: Johnny Marr
- Lyricist: Morrissey
- Producer: John Porter

The Smiths singles chronology
"What Difference Does It Make?" (1984)	"Suffer Little Children" (1984)	"William, It Was Really Nothing" (1984)

"Suffer Little Children" is a song by the English rock band the Smiths, written by singer Morrissey and guitarist Johnny Marr. It was included on their self-titled debut album in February 1984 and as a B-side to the May 1984 single "Heaven Knows I'm Miserable Now".

== Background ==
The song is about the Moors murders that took place on Saddleworth Moor, which overlooks Manchester, between 1963 and 1965. At the time of their deaths, many of the victims were only a few years older than Morrissey (born 1959), who wrote the lyrics of the song after reading a book about the murders, Beyond Belief: A Chronicle of Murder and its Detection by Emlyn Williams.

"Suffer Little Children" was the third song that Morrissey and Johnny Marr wrote together, after "The Hand That Rocks the Cradle" and another one that they discarded. The Smiths' first studio demo, recorded in August 1982 at Decibel Studios in Manchester, consisted of "The Hand That Rocks the Cradle" and "Suffer Little Children". The latter featured Simon Wolstencroft on drums and Marr overdubbing a bass line, in addition to Marr's guitar, Morrissey's baritone vocals and a piano coda that Marr had pre-recorded in the home of journalist Shelley Rohde and brought in a cassette. Morrissey took the demo to Factory Records, but Factory's Tony Wilson was not interested.

The title of the song is a phrase found in the Gospel of Matthew, chapter 19, verse 14, in which Jesus rebukes his disciples for turning away a group of children and says:

Suffer little children, and forbid them not, to come unto me: for of such is the kingdom of heaven.

== Lyrics ==
Although five children were murdered in the Moors murders case, only three are named in the song; John Kilbride ("oh John you'll never be a man"), Lesley Ann Downey ("Lesley Ann with your pretty white beads"), and Edward Evans ("Edward, see those alluring lights"). The murders of Keith Bennett and Pauline Reade were not attributed to Myra Hindley and Ian Brady until 1985, after "Suffer Little Children" had already been released.

The phrase "Hindley wakes and Hindley says; Hindley wakes, Hindley wakes, Hindley wakes, and says: 'Oh, wherever he has gone, I have gone'" refers to a chapter ("Hindley Wakes") in Williams's book. It may also be a pun on the title of Hindle Wakes, a silent film which made use of location filming in Blackpool and Manchester, based on a play by Stanley Houghton, one of the Manchester School of playwrights.

== Critical reception ==
In a retrospective review of the song, AllMusic called it "one of the finest" on the Smiths' debut album, "with the haunting refrain 'Manchester, so much to answer for' remaining one of Morrissey's most famous lyrics." New Musical Express highlighted "the deep sorrow not just in the lyrics ... but in its aching, world-weary instrumentation." Alan York of Dig! wrote, "The music to 'Suffer Little Children' is imbued with an acute Mancunian melancholy, while Morrissey and the band treat the subject matter with an admirable dignity and restraint throughout."

== Track listing ==
7-inch RT156
No.	Title	Length
1.	"Heaven Knows I'm Miserable Now"	3:34
2.	"Suffer Little Children"	5:27

- in original green sleeve

12-inch RTT156/CD RTT156CD
No.	Title	Length
1.	"Heaven Knows I'm Miserable Now"	3:34
2.	"Girl Afraid"	2:46
3.	"Suffer Little Children"	5:27

== Etchings on vinyl ==
British 7-inch: SMITHS INDEED / ILL FOREVER

British 12-inch: SMITHS PRESUMABLY / FOREVER ILL

== Controversy ==
First released on The Smiths in February 1984, it was re-released in May as a B-side of the single "Heaven Knows I'm Miserable Now". The Manchester Evening News reported that relatives of the Moors murder victims had taken exception to the lyrics, in which three of the victims are mentioned by name. Some newspapers also claimed that the single's sleeve photo of Viv Nicholson was intended to resemble Myra Hindley.

Subsequently, Boots and Woolworths withdrew both the album and single from sale. Morrissey later established a friendship with Ann West, the mother of Moors victim Lesley Ann Downey, after she accepted that the band's intentions were honourable. AllMusic remarked that "contrary to the punk-era use of Myra Hindley's name and image as a quick and dirty way to epater le bourgeois, these lyrics are sensitive and deeply felt."

== Covers ==
The song has been covered by several artists, including Hole throughout their 2010 tour.

== Sources ==
- Goddard, Simon (2004). The Smiths: Songs That Saved Your Life (2nd ed.). Reynolds & Hearn. ISBN 1-903111-84-6.
