= The Smiths (album) =

1984 studio album by the Smiths

Studio album by the Smiths
- Released: 20 February 1984
- Recorded: September–November 1983
- Studios: Pluto (Manchester) and Strawberry (Stockport); Eden and Matrix (London)
- Genres: Alternative rock; indie rock; post-punk
- Length: 42:55 (original UK vinyl release); 45:36 (versions including "This Charming Man")
- Label: Rough Trade
- Producers: John Porter, The Smiths

The Smiths chronology
The Smiths (1984)	Hatful of Hollow (1984)

Singles from The Smiths
- 1. "Hand in Glove" Released: 13 May 1983; 2. "This Charming Man" Released: 31 October 1983 (UK cassette version); 3. "What Difference Does It Make?" Released: 16 January 1984

The Smiths is the debut studio album by the English rock band the Smiths, released on 20 February 1984 by Rough Trade Records. A different version of the album was first recorded with producer Troy Tate, but the results were ultimately shelved in favour of a new version produced by John Porter. Recording took place intermittently in London, Manchester, and Stockport during September 1983, between dates on the band's national tour.

The album's songwriting pairs Johnny Marr's bright, jangly compositions and guitar work with Morrissey's literate and melancholic lyrics. The songs touch on themes of unrequited love, isolation, identity, and social disaffection. Several tracks, including "Reel Around the Fountain" and "Suffer Little Children", attracted media attention for their controversial lyrics.

Critical reception was mixed at the time, with some reviewers praising the songwriting while others criticised the production. Over time, however, retrospective assessments have recognised The Smiths as a landmark debut. It is widely considered one of the most influential British albums of the 1980s. The album was a commercial success in the United Kingdom, reaching number two on the UK Albums Chart and spending 33 weeks on that chart.

== Background ==
In May 1982, Johnny Marr visited Steven Morrissey at his home in Stretford to invite him to form a band. The two had first met in 1978 at a Patti Smith concert in Manchester and bonded over a shared interest in literature and music. After agreeing to collaborate, they began writing songs together in Marr's attic room, starting with early drafts like "The Hand That Rocks the Cradle" and "Suffer Little Children".

By late 1982, Morrissey had chosen the band name the Smiths. He explained that it was "the most ordinary name", reflecting his belief that it was time for "ordinary folk" to be seen. The band recorded their first demo in August 1982 and gave their live debut at Manchester's Ritz that October. In early 1983, the Smiths recorded a second demo at Drone Studios in Chorlton-cum-Hardy. Though EMI passed on the tape, the band persisted, rehearsing in a space provided by their manager Joe Moss and debuting new material in local gigs.

== Recording and production ==
After signing with independent record label Rough Trade, the Smiths began preparations to record their first album in mid-1983. Due to the suggestion of Rough Trade head Geoff Travis, the band selected Troy Tate (former guitarist of the Teardrop Explodes) as producer for sessions at Elephant studios in Wapping, London. During the following month, the group recorded fourteen songs. In his autobiography, Marr praised producer Troy Tate for his commitment to capturing the band's live energy. However, the sessions were made more difficult by a heatwave in London. The Smiths were recording in a hot basement studio at Elephant, and according to Marr, not only was the heat uncomfortable but it made it difficult to keep their instruments in tune.

While recording a BBC session for Dave Jensen in August 1983, the Smiths met producer John Porter, who was working in one of the studios. Travis, harbouring reservations about the group's session with Troy Tate, gave Porter a cassette of the sessions beforehand in the hopes that he could remix them. Porter told Travis that the sessions were "out of tune and out of time". Feeling the Tate sessions were unsalvageable, Porter offered to re-record the album himself. Despite praising the work with Tate, only a week prior, to the press by stating "we've done everything exactly right and it'll show", Morrissey accepted (as did Travis), while Marr hesitantly agreed. Marr later recalled that when the band reviewed the completed recordings, Morrissey was dissatisfied and the rest of the group shared some reservations. Marr admitted the mixes sounded underproduced and not suitable as their debut, though he felt the recordings still captured the band's true sound at the time. He was unsure why the album was scrapped entirely rather than simply remixed, but chose not to contest the decision.

The Smiths began work with Porter in September 1983. Due to tour commitments, the group had to make the record in a piecemeal fashion. Marr later recalled that "working with John immediately got us results...he and I formed a musical and personal relationship that was inspiring...he nurtured not just me but all the band". Recording started at London's Matrix Studios, with the majority of the work undertaken during a week's stay at Pluto, just outside Manchester. A final overdub session was performed at Eden Studios in London that November. After listening to a finished mix of the album the following month, Morrissey told Porter and Travis that the album "wasn't good enough". However, the singer said that due to the album's cost of £6,000, "[they said] it has to be released, there's no going back".

== Musical style and lyrics ==
Music critics have categorised The Smiths as an alternative rock, indie rock and post-punk recording. Mark Lindores described its lyrics as "unsettling", highlighting its thematic range from unrequited love and sexual confusion to homosexuality. Similarly, Garry Mulholland wrote that the album addressed difficult themes such as child abuse. Douglas Wolk described the album's aesthetic as "murk, sexual frankness, and situational ambiguity", arguing that most of Morrissey's lyrics on the album contains allusions to "awful" doings between adults and children. Music journalist Stephen Thomas Erlewine on AllMusic described their songs as "vital and alive, developing a new, unique voice within pop music". Bands such as the Velvet Underground and the Stooges were particularly influential on the Smiths. The opening track "Reel Around the Fountain" is a near six-minute composition that emerged from Morrissey's reflections on an early formative sexual encounter, seemingly with an older partner. Anchored by his restrained lower-register vocals, the song sets a melancholic tone for the album. "You've Got Everything Now" introduces a faster pace to the album, combining a lively arrangement with Morrissey's pointed address to a rival figure. Its lyrics express regret over the direction of his own life, though he still asserts a sense of moral or emotional superiority.

"Miserable Lie" begins with a restrained, post-punk-inspired introduction, before abruptly shifting in tempo as the rhythm section surges with renewed intensity. This structural change opens space for one of Morrissey's most unrestrained vocal performances on the album, as he ascends into erratic falsetto. "Pretty Girls Make Graves" features an arrangement centred around Andy Rourke's bass line and Marr's guitar. Lyrically, Morrissey recounts an experience with a woman whose confidence and sexuality leave him feeling insecure, ultimately leading to rejection. "The Hand That Rocks the Cradle" exemplifies the album's tendency to forego traditional choruses in favour of extended lyrical storytelling. Marr's shimmering guitar accompanies Morrissey's calm vocal delivery, though the lyrics hint at darker, possibly violent themes. "Still Ill" is driven by a steady mid-tempo rhythm, referencing a nostalgia for the past. The lyrics explore themes of identity, autonomy, and societal expectations, with Morrissey referencing questions of bodily and mental control and echoing concerns about attitudes toward sexuality in the United Kingdom, particularly in the wake of legal changes.

"Hand in Glove", originally released as the Smiths' debut single in May 1983, is marked by its dark, atmospheric instrumentation and emotionally intense vocal delivery. Marr's shimmering guitar lines and Rourke's subtle bass work combine to create a haunting new wave landscape. Morrissey's lyrics, steeped in romantic desperation and fatalism, convey both longing and the inevitability of loss. "What Difference Does It Make?" incorporates a more conventional rock structure, featuring a driving rhythm and prominent guitar hooks. Its energetic arrangement contrasts with the rest of the album's more melancholic tone, and Morrissey's impassioned delivery, particularly in the soaring outro, adds a distinctive theatrical edge. "I Don't Owe You Anything" slows the pace with a languid arrangement and subdued emotional tone. The lyrics centre around rejection and emotional detachment, as Morrissey reflects on unreciprocated affection and the inevitability of being replaced.

"Suffer Little Children" addresses the Moors murders, in which five children were sexually assaulted and murdered near Morrissey's home in Manchester in 1965. The song's subject matter drew controversy upon the album's release, leading some retailers to remove it from their shelves. In the aftermath, Morrissey established a correspondence with Ann West, the mother of victim Lesley Ann Downey, who came to believe that the song was written with sincere and respectful intentions. The lyrics of jangle pop track "This Charming Man" follow a first-person narrative in which the male protagonist punctures his bicycle tyre on a remote hillside. A well-dressed stranger in a luxury car offers him a lift. Though initially hesitant, the protagonist eventually accepts. As they drive, the two flirt, but the protagonist struggles with self-consciousness, lamenting, "I would go out tonight, but I haven't got a stitch to wear". The motorist reassures him, saying, "It's gruesome that someone so handsome should care".

== Artwork and release ==
The original image used in The Smiths album cover

The album was released on 20 February 1984. At the time of its release, Morrissey stated that The Smiths was "a signpost in the history of popular music" and that he expected "the highest critical praise". For the most part, the album was well received, reaching high chart positions but prevented from reaching number one by Sparkle in the Rain by Simple Minds. The single "What Difference Does It Make?" was shortened and released on 16 January 1984, reaching number 12 on the UK Singles Chart. "This Charming Man" was included as the sixth track on all original US releases of the album on Sire Records (LP, CD and cassette) and on the UK cassette on Rough Trade. Following the 1989 bankruptcy of Rough Trade, WEA Records purchased the Smiths' back catalogue. In 1992 WEA re-issued the band's catalogue, and all subsequent pressings of The Smiths have incorporated "This Charming Man".

The cover's sleeve for The Smiths was designed by Morrissey. It features American actor Joe D'Allesandro in a cropped still from Paul Morrissey's 1968 film Flesh. The photograph of Morrissey was taken at the "Jobs for a Change" outdoor concert organised by the Greater London Council at Jubilee Gardens on 10 June 1984. The Grammy Awards would write about the album's 40th year anniversary, stating: "Despite its subject, the cover of The Smiths doesn't scream starpower; it looks ripped out of a moldering magazine. Which completely jibes with the music—glimmering yet murky, seemingly anti-produced in places. That vibe was the point from the beginning—hence their band name".

The Smiths debuted and peaked at number two on the UK Albums Chart and remained on the chart for 33 weeks. It also reached number one on the UK Independent Albums Chart. The album played a key role in establishing the Smiths within the British music scene of the 1980s. Internationally, it also performed well, peaking at number 45 on the European Top 100 Albums and staying on the chart for 21 weeks. Following its initial run, the album re-entered the European chart in September for an additional three weeks.

== Critical reception ==
=== Contemporary response ===
Professional ratings
Review scores
Source	Rating
Rolling Stone	4/5 stars
The Village Voice	B−

Early reviews of The Smiths were mixed. NME critic Don Watson focused on the band's frontman, writing: "What Morrissey captures above all is a notion of despair reflected perfectly in the lacklustre sound of his cohorts, a death of the punk ideal that [he] is quite old enough to have been closely involved in". High Fidelity critic Wayne King saw little merit in the record. He wrote: "Forget the music, a watered-down cop of the R.E.M./Echo & the Bunnymen style of jangly, 'new psychedelic' guitar/bass/drums". Conversely, Dave DiMartino in Creem magazine called The Smiths "a stunning piece of music", remarking that "they sing about things that no other band has ever sung about, and they do it well." He said, "I haven't been as fascinated by an album in years", and concluded, "Beauty and ugliness, health and disease, all meaningless terms that the Smiths make no attempt to define, choosing instead to just jab at the differences".

Kurt Loder, writing for Rolling Stone, praised The Smiths as "surprisingly warm and entertaining", insisting that "this record repays close listening", and denoting Morrissey's painful "memories of heterosexual rejection and homosexual isolation". He wrote that the album's songs were "so rhythmically insinuating that the persistent listener is likely to find himself won over almost without warning". Robert Christgau, writing for The Village Voice, gave the album a B− and noted that Morrissey's "slightly skewed relationship to time and pitch codes his faint melodies at least as much as Marr's much-heralded real guitar". He argued that Morrissey became "an instant cult hero" due to his "slightly unskewed relationship to transitory sex", comparing his appeal to "the James Taylor effect" where "hypersensitivity [is] seen as a spiritual achievement rather than an affliction".

On the year-end critics' lists, The Smiths was ranked the second best album of 1984 by Melody Maker, eighth by The Face, ninth by NME, and 22nd in the Pazz & Jop critics' poll. Looking back a year after the album's release, Nick Kent wrote in The Face: "After too many seasons of feeling diffident and relatively untouched by contemporary popular music, along came The Smiths ... the group's first album was not more self-absorbed bleating in an aural wasteland of recycled clamour. This was something else."

=== Legacy ===
Professional ratings
Review scores
Source	Rating
AllMusic	5/5 stars
Billboard	4.5/5 stars
Chicago Tribune	3.5/4 stars
The Encyclopedia of Popular Music	3/5 stars
Pitchfork	8.8/10
Q	4/5 stars
The Rolling Stone Album Guide	4/5 stars
Uncut	4/5 stars

Over time, The Smiths received increasing acclaim in the media, although it took more than a few years for its legacy to become firmly established. Upon news of the band's split in August 1987, NME writer Danny Kelly remained unimpressed, offering a negative reassessment of their debut. By 1989, perceptions of the record had finally begun to shift.

Stephen Thomas Erlewine gave the album a score of five stars on AllMusic, writing that the album was "the bracing beginning of a new era" in an era dominated by synth-pop and post-punk. He noted that the Smiths' sound wasn't radically different from traditional British guitar pop, but was "an astonishing subversion of the form", with Marr's "inventive songwriting" and Morrissey's "distinctively ironic, witty, and literate" lyrics. Daryl Easlea, writing for BBC Music, described The Smiths as "an incredible statement of intent" and noted that it "defined northern British pop in a manner not unlike the Beatles had two decades earlier". Easlea added that the music was "completely out of step with the times, yet has come to define them", and credited the album with mapping out "a new stage of indie music". Libby Cudmore from Consequence wrote that "not even Morrissey's latter-day sins can taint the pure love listeners feel for this record".

According to The Independent, the band's frustration with their debut album played a key role in the decision to release Hatful of Hollow later in 1984. The compilation brought together early BBC sessions, which were recorded quickly and, in contrast to the album, better captured the immediacy and raw energy of their sound. The business newspaper City A.M. described The Smiths as "a strange, imperfect album", citing its slightly anaemic production and uneven pacing. However, it also praised the record's highlights, noting that the three tracks that open the second side—"Still Ill", "Hand in Glove", and "What Difference Does It Make?"—"define the band", even if the band would go on to surpass those early peaks in the years that followed. Slant Magazine questioned the track sequencing of The Smiths, particularly why the energetic and memorable single "What Difference Does It Make?" was placed so late in the album despite its release just a month earlier. The publication also argued that "This Charming Man" should have been part of the album from the outset, calling it one of the best singles of 1983.

=== Accolades ===
Music critic Garry Mulholland included The Smiths in his list of the 261 greatest albums since 1976 in the book Fear of Music (2006). While he noted the flat and dour production, he credited the album with evoking a distinct "Manchester-in-song" that stood apart from the work of Ian Curtis or Mark E. Smith. Mulholland highlighted how the album defied mid-1980s pop conventions—whether through the choice of Joe D'Allesandro for the cover, the restrained jangle of Marr's guitar work, or most notably, Morrissey's theatrical revulsion toward sex, which he portrayed as destructive to both romance and innocence.

Slant Magazine listed the album at 51 on its list of the "Best Albums of the 1980s" saying "there's no reason why a mordant, sexually frustrated disciple of Oscar Wilde who loved punk but crooned like a malfunctioning Sinatra should've teamed up with a fabulously inventive guitarist whose influences were so diffuse that it could be hard to hear them at all and formed one of the greatest songwriting duos of the '80s". PopMatters included the album on their list of "12 Essential Alternative Rock Albums from the 1980s" saying: "Alienation, mistreatment, rejection, and longing: the themes that would reoccur throughout singer Morrissey's career are fully accounted for on The Smiths, where they are rendered all the more piercing by Marr's delicate guitar-picking and John Porter's stark production".

In 1989, the album was ranked number 22 on Rolling Stone magazine's list of the 100 greatest albums of the 1980s. In 2003, the album was 481st on that magazine's list of the 500 greatest albums of all time. The magazine ranked it 473rd on an updated list in 2012, calling it "a showcase for Morrissey's morose wit and Marr's guitar chime". The album was ranked number 51 on Rolling Stone's list of the 100 Best Debut Albums of All Time. It placed at number 21 in The Guardian's list of the top 100 British albums. In 2020, AJ Ramirez of PopMatters wrote: "While the Smiths only improved from here, this is one instance where jumping in at the beginning is the advisable way to delve into an act’s catalog."

== Track listing ==
All lyrics are written by Morrissey; all music is composed by Johnny Marr.

Side one
No.	Title	Length
1.	"Reel Around the Fountain"	5:58
2.	"You've Got Everything Now"	3:59
3.	"Miserable Lie"	4:29
4.	"Pretty Girls Make Graves"	3:44
5.	"The Hand That Rocks the Cradle" (quotation from "Sonny Boy" by Ray Henderson, Lew Brown and Al Jolson)	4:38

Side two
No.	Title	Length
6.	"Still Ill"	3:23
7.	"Hand in Glove"	3:25
8.	"What Difference Does It Make?"	3:51
9.	"I Don't Owe You Anything"	4:05
10.	"Suffer Little Children"	5:28
Total length:		42:55

UK cassette and US LP/cassette
No.	Title	Length
6.	"This Charming Man"	2:41
Total length:		45:36

== Personnel ==
Credits are adapted from the album's liner notes.

The Smiths

- Morrissey – vocals
- Johnny Marr – guitars, harmonica
- Andy Rourke – bass guitar
- Mike Joyce – drums, tambourine ("Hand in Glove")

Additional musicians

- Paul Carrack – piano, organ ("Reel Around the Fountain", "You've Got Everything Now" and "I Don't Owe You Anything")
- Annalisa Jablonska – female voice ("Pretty Girls Make Graves" and "Suffer Little Children")

Production

- John Porter – production (except "Hand in Glove"), remixing ("Hand in Glove")
- The Smiths – production ("Hand in Glove")
- Phil Bush – engineering
- Neill King – engineering

Design

- Morrissey – sleeve
- Caryn Gough – layout

== Charts ==
Chart performances for The Smiths
Chart (1984)	Peak position
Australian Albums (Kent Music Report)	77
Canadian Albums (RPM)	65
Dutch Albums (Album Top 100)	28
European Top 100 Albums	45
New Zealand Albums (RMNZ)	9
Swedish Albums (Sverigetopplistan)	44
UK Albums	2
UK Independent Albums	1
US Billboard 200	150
US Cash Box	129

== Certifications ==
Certifications for The Smiths
Region	Certification	Certified units/sales
United Kingdom (BPI)	Gold	100,000^{^}
^{^} Shipments figures based on certification alone.

== See also ==
- List of 1980s albums considered the best
