= This Charming Man =

1983 single by The Smiths

Single by the Smiths

from the album The Smiths
- B-side: "Jeane"; "Accept Yourself"; "Wonderful Woman"
- Released: 31 October 1983
- Recorded: October 1983
- Studio: Strawberry, Stockport, England
- Genre: Indie pop; jangle pop
- Length: 2:41
- Label: Rough Trade
- Composer: Johnny Marr
- Lyricist: Morrissey
- Producer: John Porter

The Smiths singles chronology
"Hand in Glove" (1983)	"This Charming Man" (1983)	"What Difference Does It Make?" (1984)

Music video
- "This Charming Man" on YouTube

"This Charming Man" is a song by the English rock band the Smiths, written by guitarist Johnny Marr and singer Morrissey. Released as the group's second single on 31 October 1983 by the independent record label Rough Trade, it is defined by Marr's jangly guitar riff and Morrissey's characteristically morose lyrics, which revolve around the recurrent Smiths themes of sexual ambiguity and lust. A different version, from the John Peel Show on BBC Radio 1, was included on the 1984 compilation album Hatful of Hollow.

Feeling detached from the early 1980s gay culture, Morrissey wrote "This Charming Man" to evoke an older, more coded and self-aware underground scene. The singer said of the song's lyrics: "I really like the idea of the male voice being quite vulnerable, of it being taken and slightly manipulated, rather than there being always this heavy machismo thing that just bores everybody."

Although only moderately successful on first release—the single peaked at number 25 on the UK Singles Chart—"This Charming Man" has been widely praised in both the music and mainstream press. Reissued in 1992, it reached number 8 on the UK Singles Chart (making it the Smiths' biggest UK hit by chart position). In 2004, BBC Radio 2 listeners voted it number 97 on the station's "Sold on Song Top 100" poll. Mojo magazine journalists placed the track at number 1 on their 2008 "50 Greatest UK Indie Records of All Time" feature. It was certified double platinum by the British Phonographic Industry (BPI) in 2023.

== Background ==
By early 1983, the Smiths had gained a large following on the UK live circuit and had signed a record deal with the indie label Rough Trade. The deal, along with positive concert reviews in the weekly music press and an upcoming session on John Peel's radio show on BBC Radio 1, generated a large media buzz for the band. In a music scene dominated by corporate and video-driven acts, the Smiths' camp and bookish image stood out, and many expected the band to be the breakthrough act of the UK post-punk movement. However, the Smiths' May 1983 debut single "Hand in Glove" failed to live up to critical and commercial expectations, mostly due to its perceived low production values. When Rough Trade labelmates Aztec Camera began to receive daytime national radio play with their track "Walk Out to Winter", Marr admitted to "feeling a little jealous, my competitive urges kicked in". The guitarist believed the Smiths needed an upbeat song "in a major key" to gain a chart positioning that would live up to expectations.

Marr wrote the music to "This Charming Man" especially for the Peel session on the same night that he wrote "Still Ill" and "Pretty Girls Make Graves". Based on the Peel performance, Rough Trade label head Geoff Travis suggested that the band release the song as a single instead of the slated release "Reel Around the Fountain", which had gathered notoriety in the press due to what were seen as lyrical references to paedophilia. The Smiths entered Matrix Studios in London in September 1983 to record a second studio version of the song for release as a single. However, the result—known as the 'London version'—was unsatisfactory and soon after, the band travelled to Strawberry Studios in Stockport to try again. Here, they recorded the more widely heard A-side.

== Music and lyrics ==
The lyrics of "This Charming Man" comprise a first-person narrative in which the male protagonist punctures one of his bicycle's tyres on a remote hillside. A passing "charming man" in a luxury car stops to offer the cyclist a lift, and although the protagonist is initially hesitant, he accepts after much deliberation. While driving together, the pair flirt, although the protagonist finds it difficult to overcome his reluctance: "I would go out tonight, but I haven't got a stitch to wear". The motorist tells the cyclist: "it's gruesome that someone so handsome should care".

Morrissey deliberately used archaic language when composing the voice-over style lyrics for "This Charming Man". His use of phrases and words such as 'hillside desolate', 'stitch to wear', 'handsome' and 'charming' are used to convey a more courtly world than the mid-Eighties north of England, and evoke a style that has, in the words of the music critic Mat Snow, "nothing to do with fashion". Morrissey had already used the word 'handsome' in a song title—in "Handsome Devil", the B-side to "Hand in Glove"—and observed in a 1983 interview with Barney Hoskyns that he used the word to "try and revive some involvement with language people no longer use. In the daily scheme of things, people's language is so frighteningly limited, and if you use a word with more than 10 letters it's absolute snobbery." Snow puts forward the case that through the use of the dated word 'charming', Morrissey sought to rebel against the then mainstream gay culture from which he felt alienated. Morrissey told Hoskyns: "I hate this 'festive faggot' thing ... People listen to 'This Charming Man' and think no further than what anyone would presume. I hate that angle, and it's surprising that the gay press have harped on more than anyone else. I hate it when people talk to me about sex in a trivial way."

As with many of Morrissey's compositions, the song's lyrics feature dialogue borrowed from a cult film. The line "A jumped-up pantry boy who never knew his place" is borrowed from the 1972 film adaptation of Anthony Shaffer's 1970 play Sleuth, in which Laurence Olivier plays a cuckolded author to Michael Caine's working-class casanova.

Both studio versions begin with an introductory guitar riff, joined by the rhythm section. Morrissey's vocals are first heard eight seconds into the track. His vocal melodies are diatonic, and consciously avoid blues inflexions. The chorus is played twice; the first time it is followed by a brief pause, the second by the closing of the song. The rhythm section of Andy Rourke and Mike Joyce provides a beat more danceable than usual for a Smiths track. The drums were originally programmed on a Linn LM-1, under the direction of producer John Porter. Porter used the programme to trigger the sampled sounds of the live drum kit, featuring a Motownesque bassline. Marr's guitar part consists of single notes and thirds as opposed to strummed barre chords, and his guitar serves to create a counter-melody throughout the song. Marr overdubbed numerous guitar parts onto the song, and in a December 1993 interview, told Guitar Player magazine:

I'll try any trick. With the Smiths, I'd take this really loud Telecaster of mine, lay it on top of a Fender Twin Reverb with the vibrato on, and tune it to an open chord. Then I'd drop a knife with a metal handle on it, hitting random strings. I used it on "This Charming Man", buried beneath about 15 tracks of guitar ... it was the first record where I used those highlife-sounding runs in 3rds. I'm tuned up to F# and I finger it in G, so it comes out in A. There are about 15 tracks of guitar. People thought the main guitar part was a Rickenbacker, but it's really a '54 Tele. There are three tracks of acoustic, a backwards guitar with a really long reverb, and the effect of dropping knives on the guitar – that comes in at the end of the chorus.

The chord progression from the instrumental intro to the lyric "Will nature make a man of me" is: A | Asus4 | A | E | Bm7 | D7 | C#m | E | A | E/A | Asus4 | E

== Reception ==
On release, the song received near-unanimous critical praise. Paul Morley of the NME wrote, "'This Charming Man' is an accessible bliss, and seriously moving. This group fully understand that the casual is not enough ... This is one of the greatest singles of the year, a poor compliment. Unique and indispensable, like 'Blue Monday' and 'Karma Chameleon' – that's better!" A contemporary review in The Face asked, "Where has all the wildness and daring got to? Some of it has found its way onto the Smiths' record, 'This Charming Man'. It jangles and crashes and Morrissey jumps in the middle with his mutant choir-boy voice, sounding jolly and angst-ridden at the same time. It should be given out on street corners to unsuspecting passers-by of all ages." While the band was little-known in the United States at the time, Robert Palmer of The New York Times described the song as "sparkling, soaring, superlative pop-rock, and proof that the guitar-band format pioneered by the Beatles is still viable for groups with something to say". The following year, Palmer chose the song as the second best single of 1984.

PopMatters described the song musically as "chiming, bouncing rockabilly". Treble magazine described the song as a "stellar jangle-pop track," based on one of Marr's first truly iconic guitar licks. AllMusic's Ned Raggett noted that "Early Elvis would have approved of the music, Wilde of the words", and described the track as "an audacious end result by any standard". Tim DiGravina, of the same organisation, wrote that "Debating the merits of the track here would be a bit pointless, as it's a classic song from one of the last great classic bands. It might as well be called 'This Charming Song'." In 2007, Oasis songwriter Noel Gallagher described the first time he heard the track: "The second I heard 'This Charming Man' everything made sense. The sound of that guitar intro was incredible. The lyrics are fuckin' amazing, too."

During an appearance on Top of the Pops, Morrissey appeared waving gladioli. A 2004 BBC Radio 2 feature on the song noted that the performance was most people's introduction to the Smiths and, "therefore, to the weird, wordy world of Morrissey and the music of Johnny Marr". Uncut magazine, commentating on the nationally televised debut, wrote that "Thursday evening when Manchester's feyest first appeared on Top of the Pops would be an unexpected pivotal cultural event in the lives of a million serious English boys. His very English, camp glumness was a revolt into Sixties kitchen-sink greyness against the gaudiness of the Eighties new wave music, as exemplified by Culture Club and their ilk. The Smiths' subject matter may have been 'squalid', but there was a purity of purpose about them that you messed with at your peril." Noel Gallagher said of the performance: "None of my mates liked them — they were more hooligan types. They came into work and said, 'Fuckin' hell, did you see that poof on Top of the Pops with the bush in his back pocket?' But I thought it was life-changing."

== Versions and release history ==
The earliest version of "This Charming Man" was recorded on 14 September 1983, in Maida Vale Studio 4, for John Peel's radio programme (first broadcast: 21 September 1983). Produced by Roger Pusey, and assisted by Ted De Bono, this version of the song was first included on the 1984 compilation Hatful of Hollow. On 28 October 1983, the "Manchester" version was released in the UK in 7-inch and 12-inch formats, reaching number 25 in the UK charts. The record sleeve uses a still frame from Jean Cocteau's 1950 film Orphée, featuring French actor Jean Marais. The song was included on the cassette version of the band's debut album The Smiths in most territories.

Following the 1989 bankruptcy of Rough Trade, WEA Records purchased the Smiths' back catalogue. In 1992 WEA re-issued the band's catalogue, and all subsequent pressings of The Smiths have incorporated "This Charming Man". WEA re-released the single itself in 1992 to support the Best... I compilation album. The reissued single reached number 8 on the British singles chart, the band's highest chart placing.

In December 1983, DJ François Kevorkian released a "New York" mix of the single on Megadisc records. Kevorkian geared the song for nightclub dancefloors. The track was intended to be pressed in limited numbers for New York club DJs. However, Rough Trade boss Geoff Travis liked the mix and gave the release wide distribution in the UK. Morrissey publicly disowned the mix and urged fans not to purchase copies. Travis later claimed, "It was my idea, but they agreed. They said 'Go ahead', then didn't like it so it was withdrawn." He also said, "Nothing that ever happened in the Smiths occurred without Morrissey's guidance; there's not one Smiths record that went out that Morrissey didn't ask to do, so there's nothing on my conscience."

== Cover versions ==
Death Cab for Cutie covered "This Charming Man" for their 1997 demo You Can Play These Songs with Chords.

In 2001, Canadian indie pop band Stars covered the song for their debut album Nightsongs.

American rock band The Killers performed a cover of the song alongside Johnny Marr on guitar, during their headline Glastonbury Festival set in 2019.

French new wave covers band Nouvelle Vague covered "This Charming Man" on their 2024 album Should I Stay or Should I Go, continuing their reworkings of 1980s new wave classics in a bossa nova style.

== Track listing ==
UK 7-inch single, 1983 and 1992, and 1992 cassette single
No.	Title	Length
1.	"This Charming Man"	2:41
2.	"Jeane"	3:02

UK 12-inch single, 1983
No.	Title	Length
1.	"This Charming Man (Manchester)" (Same as Original Single Version)	2:41
2.	"This Charming Man (London)"	2:47
3.	"Accept Yourself"	3:55
4.	"Wonderful Woman"	3:08

US 12-inch single, December 1983
No.	Title	Length
1.	"This Charming Man (New York) Vocal" (Remixed by François Kevorkian)	5:35
2.	"This Charming Man (New York) Instrumental" (Remixed by François Kevorkian)	4:18

UK CD single 1, 1992 CD1
No.	Title	Length
1.	"This Charming Man (Manchester)" (Same as Original Single Version)	2:41
2.	"Jeane"	3:02
3.	"Wonderful Woman"	3:08
4.	"Accept Yourself"	3:55

UK CD single 2, 1992
No.	Title	Length
1.	"This Charming Man (Manchester)" (Same as Original Single Version)	2:41
2.	"This Charming Man (London)"	2:47
3.	"This Charming Man (New York Vocal)"	5:33
4.	"This Charming Man (New York Instrumental)"	4:19
5.	"This Charming Man (Peel Session from 21 September 1983)"	2:43
6.	"This Charming Man (Single Remix)"	2:46
7.	"This Charming Man (Original Single Version)"	2:41

USA CD single 1, 1992 CD1
No.	Title	Length
1.	"This Charming Man (Manchester)" (Same as Original Single Version)	2:41
2.	"Jeane"	3:02
3.	"Accept Yourself"	3:55

USA CD single 2, 1992
No.	Title	Length
1.	"This Charming Man (Manchester)" (Same as Original Single Version)	2:41
2.	"This Charming Man (London)"	2:47
3.	"This Charming Man (New York Vocal)"	5:33
4.	"This Charming Man (New York Instrumental)"	4:19
5.	"This Charming Man (Peel Session from 21 September 1983)"	2:43
6.	"This Charming Man (Single Remix)"	2:46
7.	"This Charming Man (Original Single Version)"	2:41
8.	"Wonderful Woman"	3:08

Japanese CD single, 1992
No.	Title	Length
1.	"This Charming Man (Manchester)" (Same as Original Single Version)	2:41
2.	"This Charming Man (London)"	2:47
3.	"This Charming Man (New York Vocal)"	5:33
4.	"This Charming Man (New York Instrumental)"	4:19
5.	"This Charming Man (Peel Session from 21 September 1983)"	2:43
6.	"This Charming Man (Single Remix)"	2:46
7.	"This Charming Man (Original Single Version)"	2:41
8.	"Jeane"	3:02
9.	"Wonderful Woman"	3:08
10.	"Accept Yourself"	3:55

== Personnel ==
- Morrissey – vocals
- Johnny Marr – guitars
- Andy Rourke – bass guitar
- Mike Joyce – drums

== Charts ==
Year	Chart	Peak position
1983	UK Singles (Official Charts)	25
1983	UK Indie Chart (OCC)	1
1984	Australia (Kent Music Report)	52
1984	New Zealand (Recorded Music NZ)	15
1992	Australia (ARIA)	108
1992	Ireland (IRMA)	9
1992	UK Singles (Official Charts)	8
1992	UK Airplay (Music Week)	46

== Certifications ==
Region	Certification	Certified units/sales
New Zealand (RMNZ)	2× Platinum	60,000^{‡}
Spain (Promusicae)	Gold	30,000^{‡}
United Kingdom (BPI)	3× Platinum	1,800,000^{‡}
^{‡} Sales+streaming figures based on certification alone.
