= Moors murders =

1963–65 serial child killings in England

Ian Brady and Myra Hindley
- Brady and Hindley after their arrests in October 1965
- Born: Ian Brady: Ian Duncan Stewart: Glasgow, Scotland 2 January 1938; Myra Hindley: Crumpsall, Lancashire, England 23 July 1942
- Died: Ian Brady: Merseyside, England 15 May 2017 (aged 79); Myra Hindley: Bury St. Edmunds, England 15 November 2002 (aged 60)
- Other name: The Moors Murderers
- Status: Both: Died while imprisoned
- Conviction: Both: Murder (3 counts)
- Penalty: Both: Life imprisonment (whole life tariff)

Details
- Span of crimes: 12 July 1963 – 6 October 1965
- Country: England
- Locations: Manchester and surroundings (West Riding of Yorkshire, Cheshire, Lancashire)
- Killed: 5 children (known)
- Date apprehended: Brady: 7 October 1965; Hindley: 11 October 1965

The Moors murders were a series of murders of children committed by Ian Brady (né: Stewart) and Myra Hindley in and around Manchester, England, between July 1963 and October 1965. The five known victims – Pauline Reade, John Kilbride, Keith Bennett, Lesley Ann Downey and Edward Evans – were aged between 10 and 17, and at least four were sexually assaulted. The bodies of two of the victims were discovered in 1965, in graves dug on Saddleworth Moor; a third grave was discovered there in 1987, more than twenty years after Brady and Hindley's trial. Bennett's body is also thought to be buried there, but despite repeated searches it remains undiscovered.

Brady and Hindley were charged only for the murders of Kilbride, Downey and Evans, and received life sentences under a whole life order. The investigation was reopened in 1985 after Brady was reported as having confessed to the murders of Reade and Bennett. Hindley stopped claiming her innocence in 1987 and confessed to all of the murders. After confessing to these additional murders, Brady and Hindley were taken separately to Saddleworth Moor to assist in the search for the graves.

Characterised by the press as "the most evil woman in Britain", Hindley made several appeals against her life sentence, claiming she was a reformed woman and no longer a danger to society, but was never released. She died in 2002 in West Suffolk Hospital, aged 60, after serving thirty-six years in prison. Brady was diagnosed as a psychopath in 1985 and confined in the high-security Ashworth Hospital, Merseyside. He made it clear that he wished to never be released and repeatedly asked to be allowed to die. He died in 2017, at Ashworth, aged 79, having served fifty-one years.

The murders were the result of what Malcolm MacCulloch, professor of forensic psychiatry at Cardiff University, described as a "concatenation of circumstances". The trial judge, Mr Justice Fenton Atkinson, described Brady and Hindley in his closing remarks as "two sadistic killers of the utmost depravity". Their crimes were the subject of extensive worldwide media coverage.

== Background ==
=== Ian Brady ===
Ian Brady was born in the Gorbals area of Glasgow as Ian Duncan Stewart on 2 January 1938 to Margaret "Peggy" Stewart, an unmarried tea room waitress. The identity of Brady's father has never been reliably ascertained, although his mother said he was a journalist working for a Glasgow newspaper who died three months before Brady was born. Brady's mother had little support and after a few months was forced to give her son into the care of Mary and John Sloan, a local couple with four children of their own. Brady took their family name and became known as Ian Sloan. His mother continued to visit him throughout his childhood.

At age 9, Brady visited Loch Lomond with his family, where he reportedly discovered an affinity for the outdoors. A few months later, the family moved to a new council house on an overspill estate at Pollok. Various authors have stated that Brady tortured animals. It was reported, for example, that he boasted of killing his first cat when he was 10 years old, and then went on to burn another cat alive, stone dogs and cut off rabbits' heads. Brady, however, denied any accusations of animal abuse.

Brady's behaviour worsened when he attended Shawlands Academy, a school for above-average pupils. As a teenager, he twice appeared before a juvenile court for housebreaking. Brady left the academy aged 15 and took a job as a tea boy at a Harland and Wolff shipyard in Govan. Nine months later, he began working as a butcher's messenger boy. Brady had a girlfriend, Evelyn Grant, but their relationship ended when he threatened her with a flick knife after she visited a dance with another boy. He again appeared before the court, this time with nine charges against him, and shortly before his seventeenth birthday he was placed on probation on condition that he live with his mother. By then, Brady's mother had moved to Manchester and married an Irish fruit merchant named Patrick Brady; Patrick got his stepson a job as a fruit porter at Smithfield Market Hall, and Ian took Patrick's surname.

Within a year of moving to Manchester, Brady was caught with a sack full of lead seals he had stolen and was trying to smuggle out of the market. He was sent to Strangeways Prison for three months. As he was still under age 18, Brady was sentenced to two years in a borstal for "training". He was sent to Latchmere House in London, and then to Hatfield borstal in the West Riding of Yorkshire. After being discovered drunk on alcohol he had brewed, Brady was moved to the much tougher unit in Hull. Released on 14 November 1957, Brady returned to Manchester, where he took a labouring job which he hated, and was dismissed from another job in a brewery. Deciding to "better himself", he obtained a set of instruction manuals on bookkeeping from a local public library, with which he "astonished" his mother and stepfather by studying alone in his room for hours.

In January 1959, Brady applied for, and was offered, a clerical job at Millwards Merchandising, a wholesale chemical distribution company based in Gorton. He was regarded by his colleagues as a quiet, punctual, but short-tempered young man. Brady read books, including Teach Yourself German, Mein Kampf and books about Nazi atrocities. He was partly inspired by the life and works of French author Marquis de Sade, whose name was the etymological inspiration for the term "sadism". Brady rode a Tiger Cub motorcycle, which he used to visit the Pennines.

=== Myra Hindley ===
Myra Hindley was born in Crumpsall on 23 July 1942 to Bob and Nellie Hindley, and raised in Gorton, then a working-class area of Manchester dominated by Victorian slum housing. Her father was an alcoholic who was frequently violent towards his wife and children. The family home was in poor condition, and Hindley was forced to sleep in a single bed next to her parents' double bed. Their living situation deteriorated further when Hindley's younger sister, Maureen, was born in August 1946. The following year, five-year-old Myra was sent to live nearby with her grandmother.

During the Second World War, Hindley's father had served with the Parachute Regiment and was stationed in North Africa, Cyprus and Italy. He had been known as a hard man while in the army and he expected his daughter to be equally tough; he taught her to fight and insisted that she stick up for herself. When Hindley was about eight years old, a local boy scratched her cheeks, drawing blood. She burst into tears and ran to her father, who threatened to "leather" her if she did not retaliate; Hindley found the boy and knocked him down with a series of punches. As she wrote later, "At eight years old I'd scored my first victory." Malcolm MacCulloch, professor of forensic psychiatry at Cardiff University, has written that Hindley's "relationship with her father brutalised her ... She was not only used to violence in the home but rewarded for it outside. When this happens at a young age, it can distort a person's reaction to such situations for life."

In June 1957, one of Hindley's closest friends, thirteen-year-old Michael Higgins, invited Hindley to go swimming with friends at a local disused reservoir, but she instead went out elsewhere with another friend. Higgins drowned in the reservoir; and Hindley – a good swimmer – was deeply upset and blamed herself. She took up a collection for a wreath; his funeral was held at St Francis's Monastery in Gorton Lane.

The monastery where Hindley had been baptised a Catholic as an infant in 1942 had a lasting effect on her. Hindley's father had insisted she have a Catholic baptism; her mother agreed on the condition that she not be sent to a Catholic school, believing that "all the monks taught was the catechism". Hindley was increasingly drawn to the Roman Catholic Church after she started at Ryder Brow Secondary Modern and began taking instruction for formal reception into the Church soon after Higgins's funeral. She took the confirmation name of Veronica and received her First Communion in November 1958.

Hindley's first job was as a junior clerk at a local electrical engineering firm. She ran errands, typed, made tea and was well liked enough that when she lost her first week's wage packet, the other women took up a collection to replace it. At age 17, Hindley became engaged after a short courtship but called it off several months later after deciding the young man was immature and unable to provide her with the life she wanted. She took weekly judo lessons at a local school but found partners reluctant to train with her as she was often slow to release her grip. Hindley took a job at Bratby and Hinchliffe, an engineering company in Gorton, but was dismissed for absenteeism after six months.

=== As a couple ===
In January 1961, the eighteen-year-old Hindley joined Millwards as a typist. She soon became infatuated with Brady. Hindley began a diary and, although she had dates with other men, some of the entries detail her fascination with Brady, to whom she eventually spoke for the first time on 27 July. Over the next few months she continued to make entries but grew increasingly disillusioned with Brady, until 22 December when he asked her on a date to the cinema. (Note: Many sources state that the film was Judgment at Nuremberg, but Hindley recalled it as King of Kings.)

Brady and Hindley's dates followed a regular pattern: a trip to the cinema – usually to watch an X-rated film – then back to Hindley's house to drink German wine. Brady gave Hindley reading material, and the pair spent their lunch breaks reading aloud to one another from accounts of Nazi atrocities. Hindley began to emulate an ideal of Aryan perfection, bleaching her hair blonde and applying thick crimson lipstick. She occasionally expressed concern at some aspects of Brady's character; in a letter to a childhood friend, she mentioned an incident where she had been drugged by Brady but also wrote of her obsession with him. A few months later, she asked her friend to destroy the letter. In her 30,000-word plea for parole submitted to Home Secretary Merlyn Rees, Hindley said:

Within months he [Brady] had convinced me that there was no God at all: he could have told me that the earth was flat, the moon was made of green cheese, and the sun rose in the west, I would have believed him, such was his power of persuasion.

Hindley began to change her appearance further, wearing high boots, short skirts and leather jackets – clothing considered risqué for the period. Both she and Brady became less sociable to their colleagues. The couple were regulars at the library, borrowing books on philosophy as well as crime and torture. They also read works by de Sade, Friedrich Nietzsche and Fyodor Dostoevsky's Crime and Punishment. (Note: Brady told the police thirty years later that everything he had ever done was in Crime and Punishment. Brady also claimed that Dostoevsky and Nietzsche were his biggest influences.) Although Hindley was not a qualified driver (she passed her test on 7 November 1963 after failing three times), she often hired a van, in which the couple planned bank robberies.

Hindley befriended George Clitheroe, the president of the Cheadle Rifle Club, and on several occasions visited two local shooting ranges. Clitheroe, although puzzled by her interest, arranged for her to buy a .22 rifle from a gun merchant in Manchester. She also asked to join a pistol club, but she was a poor shot and allegedly bad-tempered, so Clitheroe told her that she was unsuitable. She did, however, manage to purchase a Webley .45 and a Smith & Wesson .38 from other members of the club. Brady and Hindley's plans for robbery came to nothing, but they became interested in photography. Brady already owned a Box Brownie, which he used to take photographs of Hindley and her dog, Puppet, but he upgraded to a more sophisticated model, and also purchased lights and darkroom equipment. The pair took photographs of each other that, at the time, would have been considered explicit. For Hindley, this demonstrated a marked change from her earlier, more shy and prudish nature.

=== As murderers ===
What they were doing was out of the scope of most people's understanding, beyond the comprehension of the workaday neighbours who were more interested in how they were going to pay the gas bill or what might happen in the next episode of Coronation Street or Doctor Who. In 1960s Britain, people did not kidnap and murder children for fun. It was simply beyond the realms of most people's comprehension, and this is why they managed to get away with it for so long.

— Chris Cowley

Hindley later claimed that Brady began to talk about "committing the perfect murder" around the beginning of July 1963, and often spoke to her about Meyer Levin's Compulsion, published as a novel in 1956 and adapted for the cinema in 1959. The story tells a fictionalised account of the Leopold and Loeb case, two young men from wealthy families who attempt to commit the perfect murder of a twelve-year-old boy, and who escape the death penalty because of their age.

By this stage, Brady had moved in with Hindley at her grandmother's house in Bannock Street, Gorton, and on 12 July, the two murdered their first victim, sixteen-year-old Pauline Reade. Reade had attended school with Hindley's younger sister Maureen and had also been in a short relationship with David Smith, a local teenager with three criminal convictions for minor crimes. Police found nobody who had seen Reade immediately before her disappearance, and although the fifteen-year-old Smith was among the people questioned by police, he was cleared of any involvement in her death. Brady and Hindley were not among the people questioned.

The couple's next victim, twelve-year-old John Kilbride, was lured away from a market in the town of Ashton-under-Lyne on 23 November and murdered on Saddleworth Moor, where his body was buried. A huge search was undertaken, with over 700 statements taken and 500 "missing" posters printed. Eight days after he failed to return home, 2,000 volunteers scoured waste ground and derelict buildings. Hindley hired a vehicle the week after Kilbride went missing, and again on 21 December, apparently to make sure the burial sites at Saddleworth Moor had not been disturbed. In February 1964, she bought a second-hand Austin Traveller but soon after traded it for a Mini Pick-up.

Keith Bennett, also aged 12, disappeared in the Longsight district of Manchester on 16 June 1964. His stepfather, Jimmy Johnson, became a suspect; in the two years following Bennett's disappearance, Johnson was taken for questioning on four occasions. Detectives searched under the floorboards of the family home, and on discovering that the houses in the row were connected, extended the search to the entire street.

Maureen Hindley married David Smith on 15 August 1964. The marriage was hastily arranged and performed at a register office. None of Maureen's family attended. Hindley did not approve of the marriage, and her mother was embarrassed, as eighteen-year-old Maureen was then seven months pregnant and was marrying the sixteen-year-old Smith. The younger couple then moved into Smith's father's house in the Ancoats district, although they were soon rehoused in a tower block flat on the new Hattersley overspill housing estate.

The day after the wedding, Brady suggested that the four take a day-trip to Windermere. This was the first time Brady and Smith had met properly, and Brady was apparently impressed by Smith's demeanour. The two talked about society, the distribution of wealth and the possibility of robbing a bank. The young Smith was similarly impressed by Brady, who throughout the day had paid for his food and wine. The trip to the Lake District was the first of many outings. Hindley was apparently jealous of their friendship but became closer to her sister.

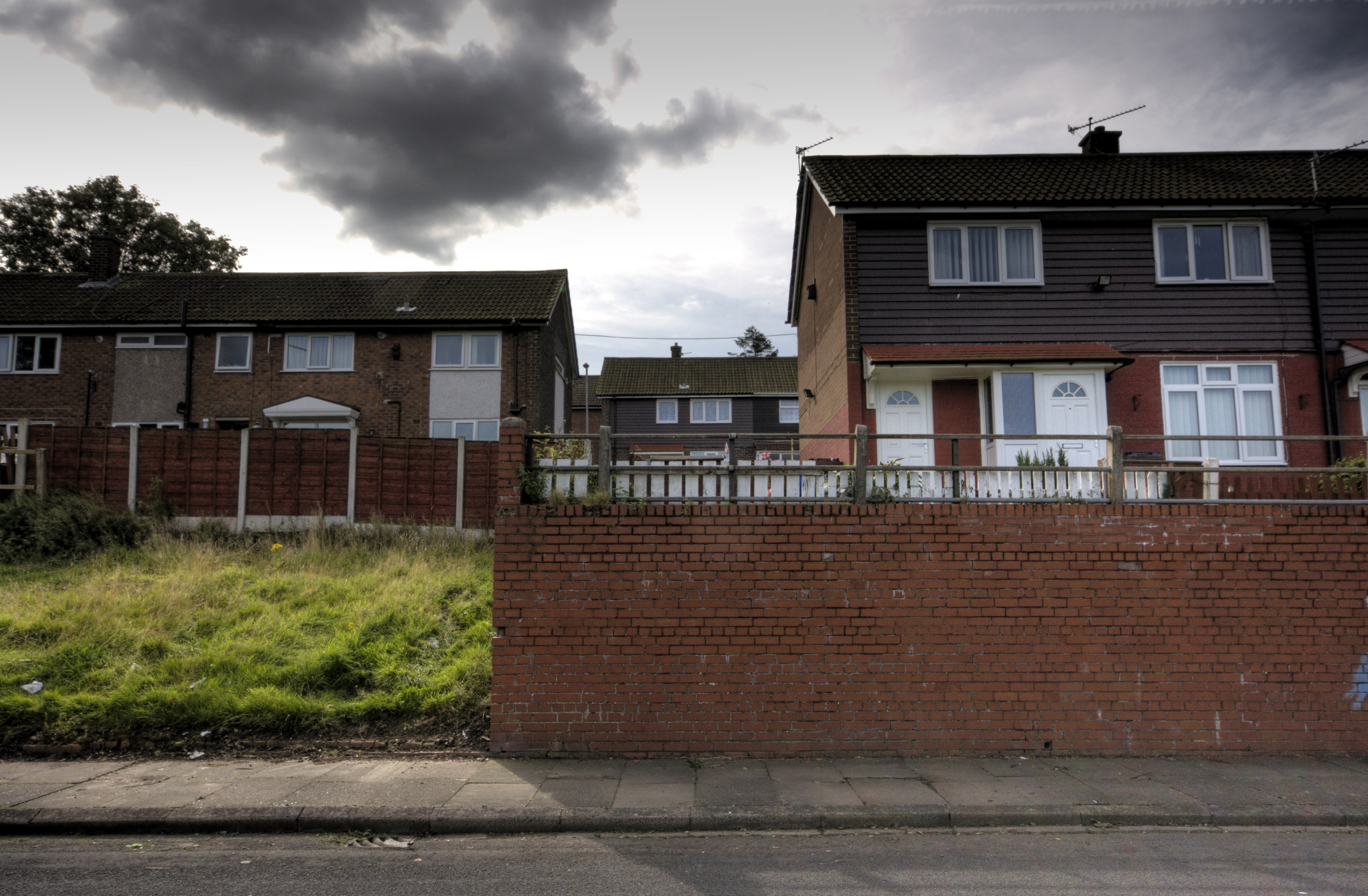
The empty plot where 16 Wardle Brook Avenue in Hattersley once stood. Manchester City Council decided in 1987 to demolish the house.

Meanwhile in 1964, Brady, Hindley and her grandmother were rehoused as part of the postwar slum clearances in Manchester, moving to 16 Wardle Brook Avenue – a newly built council house on the Hattersley overspill estate, near the Cheshire town of Hyde. Brady and Hindley became friendly with Patricia Hodges, the eleven-year-old daughter of a neighbour. Hodges accompanied the couple on their trips to Saddleworth Moor to collect peat, something that many householders on the new estate did to improve the soil in their gardens, which were full of clay and builder's rubble. The couple never harmed Hodges, since she lived only a few doors away, which would have made it easier for police to solve any disappearance.

Early on Boxing Day 1964, Hindley left her grandmother at a relative's house and refused to allow her back to Wardle Brook Avenue that night. That same day, ten-year-old Lesley Ann Downey disappeared from a funfair in Ancoats. Despite a large search, she was not found. Downey's stepfather, Alan West, was treated as a suspect by police and repeatedly questioned over her disappearance, but no evidence was uncovered and the disappearance remained unsolved for nearly a year. The following day, Hindley brought her grandmother back home.

By February 1965, Hodges had stopped visiting Wardle Brook Avenue, but Smith was still a regular visitor. Brady gave Smith books to read, and the two discussed robbery and murder. On Hindley's twenty-third birthday in July 1965, her sister and brother-in-law, who had until then been living with relatives, were rehoused in Underwood Court, a new multi-storey block of flats not far from Wardle Brook Avenue. The two couples began to see each other more regularly, but usually only on Brady's terms.

Many years later, Hindley claimed that she took part in the killings only because Brady had drugged her, was blackmailing her with pornographic pictures he had taken of her and had threatened to kill Maureen. She also claimed that on the journey home from Saddleworth Moor following the murder of Reade, Brady had warned her that she would end up in the same grave as their victim. In 2008 her solicitor, Andrew McCooey, reported that she told him:

I ought to have been hanged. I deserved it. My crime was worse than Brady's because I enticed the children and they would never have entered the car without my role... I have always regarded myself as worse than Brady.

== Murders ==
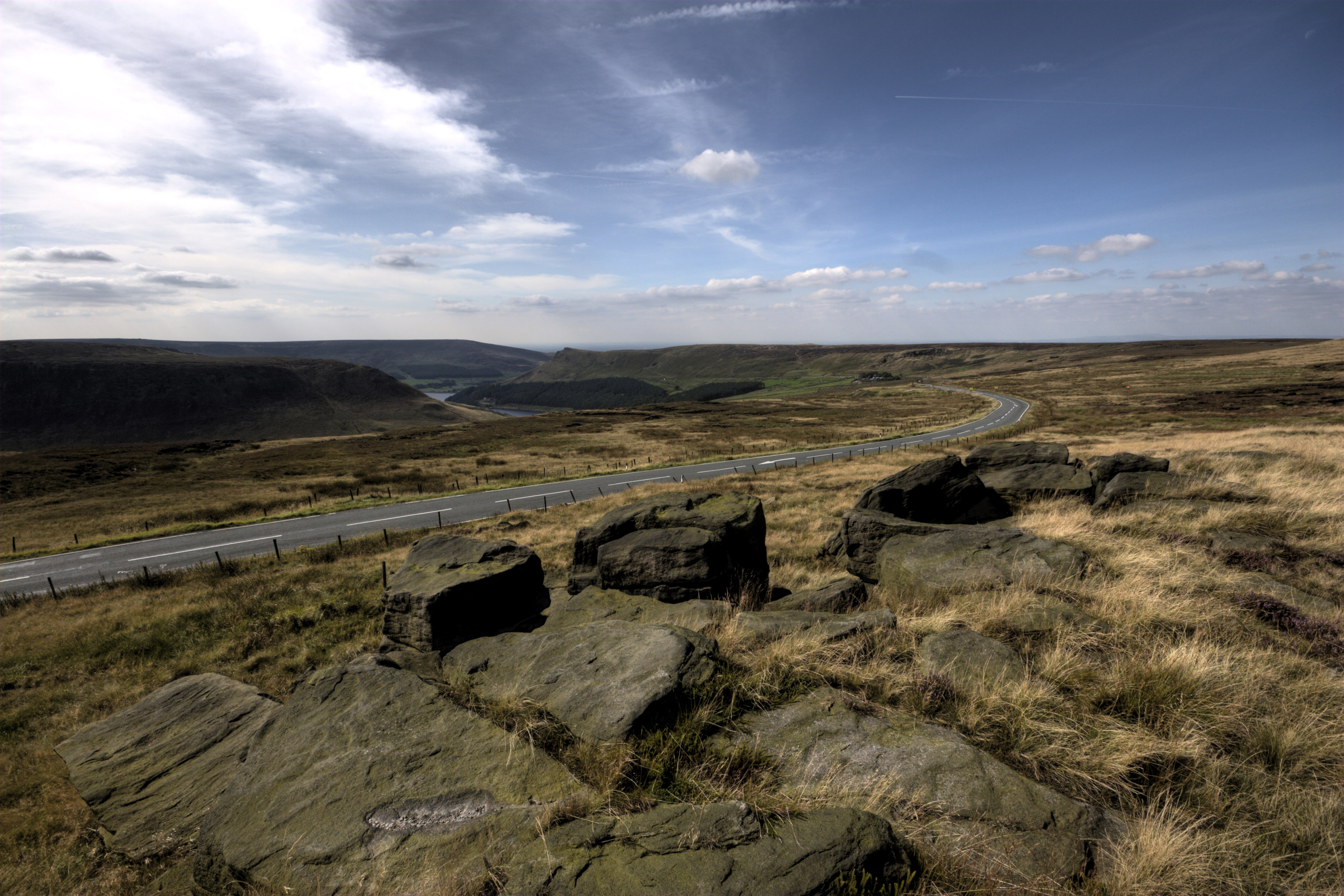
Saddleworth Moor, viewed from Hollin Brown Knoll. The bodies of three of the victims were found in this area.

=== Pauline Reade ===
On 12 July 1963, Brady told Hindley that he wanted to commit the "perfect murder". After work he instructed her to drive a borrowed van around the area while he followed on his motorcycle; when he spotted a likely victim he would flash his headlight. Driving down Gorton Lane, Brady saw a young girl and signalled Hindley, who did not stop because she recognised the girl as an eight-year-old neighbour of her mother. Sometime after 7:30 p.m., Brady signalled Hindley to stop for sixteen-year-old Pauline Reade, a schoolmate of Hindley's sister Maureen, who was on Froxmer Street on her way to a dance; Hindley offered Reade a lift. At various times, Hindley gave conflicting statements about the extent to which she, versus Brady, was responsible for Reade being selected as their first victim, but said she felt that there would be less attention given to the disappearance of a teenager than of a young child.

Once Reade was in the van, Hindley asked her to help in searching Saddleworth Moor for an expensive lost glove; Reade agreed and they drove there. When Brady arrived on his motorcycle, Hindley told Reade he would be helping in the search. Hindley later claimed that she waited in the van while Brady took Reade onto the moor. Brady returned alone after about thirty minutes, and took Hindley to the spot where Reade lay dying; Reade's clothes were in disarray and she had been nearly decapitated by two cuts to the throat, including a four-inch incision across her voice box "inflicted with considerable force" and into which the collar of her coat and a throat chain had been pushed. When Hindley asked Brady whether he had raped Reade, Brady replied, "Of course I did." Hindley stayed with Reade while Brady retrieved a spade he had hidden nearby on a previous visit, then returned to the van while Brady buried Reade. In Brady's account, Hindley was not only present for the attack, but participated in the sexual assault.

=== John Kilbride ===
In this photograph taken by Brady in November 1963, Hindley crouches over John Kilbride's grave on Saddleworth Moor with her dog, Puppet.

In the early evening of 23 November 1963, at a market in Ashton-under-Lyne, Brady and Hindley offered twelve-year-old John Kilbride a lift home, also promising him a bottle of sherry. Once Kilbride was inside Hindley's hired Ford Anglia car, Brady said they would have to make a detour to their home for the sherry. Brady then suggested another detour, this time to search for a glove Hindley had lost on Saddleworth Moor. When they reached the moor, Brady took Kilbride with him while Hindley waited in the car. Brady sexually assaulted Kilbride and tried to slit his throat with a six-inch serrated blade before strangling him with a shoelace or string. He then buried Kilbride's body in a shallow grave and, at some point afterwards, photographed Hindley and her pet dog standing atop the recently disturbed ground.

=== Keith Bennett ===
Early in the evening of 16 June 1964, Hindley asked twelve-year-old Keith Bennett, who was on his way to his grandmother's house in Longsight, for help in loading some boxes into her Mini, after which she said she would drive him home. Brady was in the back of the van. Hindley drove to a lay-by on Saddleworth Moor and Brady went off with Bennett, supposedly looking for a lost glove. After about thirty minutes Brady returned alone, carrying a spade that he had hidden there earlier, and, in response to Hindley's questions, said that he had sexually assaulted Bennett and strangled him with a piece of string.

=== Lesley Ann Downey ===
Brady and Hindley visited a funfair in Ancoats on 26 December 1964 and noticed that ten-year-old Lesley Ann Downey was apparently alone. They approached her and deliberately dropped some shopping they were carrying, then asked her for help in taking the packages to their car, and then to Wardle Brook Avenue. At the house, Downey was undressed, gagged and forcibly posed for photographs before being raped and killed, perhaps strangled with a piece of string. The attack was recorded on a reel-to-reel audio tape, with both Brady and Hindley's voices appearing, as their victim screamed and begged for mercy. Hindley later maintained that she went to run a bath for Downey and found the victim dead when she returned; Brady claimed that Hindley committed the murder. The following morning Brady and Hindley drove Downey's body to Saddleworth Moor and buried her – naked with her clothes at her feet – in a shallow grave.

=== Edward Evans ===
On the evening of 6 October 1965, Hindley drove Brady to Manchester Central railway station, where she waited outside in the car while he selected a victim. After a few minutes Brady reappeared in the company of seventeen-year-old Edward Evans, an apprentice engineer who lived in Ardwick, to whom he introduced Hindley as his sister. Brady later claimed that he had picked up Evans for a sexual encounter. They drove to Brady and Hindley's home at Wardle Brook Avenue, where they relaxed over a bottle of wine.

At some point Brady sent Hindley to fetch David Smith, her brother-in-law. Although Hindley's family had not approved of Maureen's marriage to Smith, Brady had been cultivating a friendship with his brother-in-law, which increasingly worried Hindley as she felt it compromised their safety. Hindley returned with Smith and told him to wait outside for her signal, a flashing light. When the signal came, Smith knocked on the door and was met by Brady, who asked if he had come for "the miniature wine bottles" and left him in the kitchen, saying that he was going to collect the wine. Smith later told the police:

I waited about a minute or two then suddenly I heard a hell of a scream; it sounded like a woman, really high-pitched. Then the screams carried on, one after another really loud. Then I heard Myra shout, "Dave, help him," very loud. When I ran in I just stood inside the living room and I saw a young lad. He was lying with his head and shoulders on the couch and his legs were on the floor. He was facing upwards. Ian was standing over him, facing him, with his legs on either side of the young lad's legs. The lad was still screaming ... Ian had a hatchet in his hand ... he was holding it above his head and he hit the lad on the left side of his head with the hatchet. I heard the blow, it was a terrible hard blow, it sounded horrible.

Smith then watched Brady throttle Evans with a length of electrical cord. Brady sprained his ankle in the struggle, and Evans' body was too heavy for Smith to carry to the car on his own, so they wrapped it in plastic sheeting and put it in the spare bedroom with the intention of disposing of it later.

== Investigation ==
=== Arrest ===
After the murder of Evans, Smith agreed to return the following morning to help transport the body to the car before disposing of it on Saddleworth Moor. He arrived home around 3:00 a.m. and asked his wife to make a cup of tea, which he drank before vomiting and telling her what he had witnessed. At 6:10 a.m., having waited for daylight and armed himself with a screwdriver and bread knife – in case Brady was planning to intercept him – Smith called police from a phone box on the estate. He was picked up from the phone box by a police car and taken to Hyde police station, where he told officers what he had witnessed the previous night.

Police Superintendent Bob Talbot of Stalybridge police division went to Wardle Brook Avenue, accompanied by a detective sergeant. Wearing a bread deliveryman's overall on top of his uniform, he asked Hindley at the back door if her husband was home. When she denied that she had a husband or that a man was in the house, Talbot identified himself. Hindley led him into the living room, where Brady was lying on a divan, writing to his employer about his ankle injury. Talbot explained that he was investigating "an act of violence involving guns" that was reported to have taken place the previous evening. Hindley denied there had been any violence, and allowed police to look around the house. When police asked for the key to the locked spare bedroom, she said it was at her workplace; but after police offered to take her to retrieve it, Brady told her to hand it over. Evans' body was discovered in the bedroom, and Brady was arrested on suspicion of murder. As Brady was getting dressed, he said, "Eddie and I had a row and the situation got out of hand."

=== Initial analysis ===
Though Hindley was not initially arrested, she demanded to go with Brady to the police station, taking her dog. She refused to make any statement about Evans' death beyond claiming it had been an accident, and was allowed to go home on the condition that she return the next day. Over the next four days Hindley visited her employer and asked to be dismissed so that she would be eligible for unemployment benefits. On one of these occasions, she found an envelope belonging to Brady which she burned in an ashtray; she claimed she did not open it but believed it contained plans for bank robberies.

In the meantime, police were uncovering more evidence and became convinced that Hindley was actively involved in the murder of Evans and other possible victims. On 11 October, she too was arrested and taken into custody. She was charged as an accessory to the murder of Evans and remanded at Risley Prison.

Police searching Wardle Brook Avenue found an old exercise book with the name "John Kilbride", which made them suspect that Brady and Hindley had been involved in the unsolved disappearances of other children and teenagers. Brady told police that he and Evans had fought, but insisted that he and Smith had murdered Evans and that Hindley had "only done what she had been told".

Smith said that Brady had asked him to return anything incriminating, such as "dodgy books", which Brady then packed into suitcases; he had no idea what else the suitcases contained or where they might be, though he mentioned that Brady "had a thing about railway stations". A search of left-luggage offices turned up the suitcases at Manchester Central station on 15 October; the claim ticket was later found in Hindley's prayer book. Inside one of the cases were – among an assortment of costumes, notes, photographs and negatives – nine pornographic photographs of a young girl, soon identified as Downey, naked and with a scarf tied across her mouth, and a sixteen-minute audiotape recording of a girl identifying herself as "Lesley Ann Weston" (Note: Downey's stepfather was named Alan West.) screaming, crying and pleading to be allowed to return home to her mother. Downey's mother was asked by police to look at the two photographs which were deemed appropriate in order to identify her daughter, and also to verify that the voice from the recording, too, was of her daughter.

Officers making inquiries at neighbouring houses spoke to Hodges, who had on several occasions been taken to Saddleworth Moor by Brady and Hindley, and was able to point out their favourite sites along the A635 road. Police immediately began to search the area, and on 16 October found an arm bone protruding from the peat, which was presumed at first to be that of Kilbride, but which the next day was identified as that of Downey, whose body was still visually identifiable; her mother was able to identify the clothing, which had also been buried in the grave.

Among the photographs in the suitcase were a number of scenes of the Moors. Smith had told police that Brady had boasted of "photographic proof" of multiple murders, and officers, struck by Brady's decision to remove the apparently innocent landscapes from the house, appealed to locals for assistance finding locations to match the photographs. On 21 October they found the "badly decomposed" body of Kilbride, which his mother had to identify by clothing. That same day, already being held for the murder of Evans, Brady and Hindley appeared at Hyde Magistrates' Court charged with Downey's murder. Each was brought before the court separately and remanded into custody for a week. They made a two-minute appearance on 28 October, and were again remanded into custody.

Investigating officers suspected Brady and Hindley of murdering other missing children and teenagers who had disappeared from areas in and around Manchester over the previous few years. The search continued for a while after the discovery of Kilbride's body, but with winter setting in it was called off in November. Various newspapers were also keen to name possible further victims of the "Moors Murders", with Reade and Bennett being two of them.

Presented with the evidence of the tape recording, Brady admitted to taking the photographs of Downey, but insisted that she had been brought to Wardle Brook Avenue by two men who had subsequently taken her away again, alive. By 2 December, Brady had been charged with the murders of Kilbride, Downey and Evans. Hindley had been charged with the murders of Downey and Evans, and being an accessory to the murder of Kilbride. At the committal hearing on 6 December, Brady was charged with the murders of Evans, Kilbride and Downey, and Hindley with the murders of Evans and Downey, as well as with harbouring Brady in the knowledge that he had killed Kilbride. The prosecution's opening statement was held in chambers rather than in open court, and the defence asked for a similar stipulation but was refused. The proceedings continued before three magistrates in Hyde over an eleven-day period during December, at the end of which the pair were committed for trial at Chester Assizes.

Many of the photographs taken by Brady and Hindley on the moor featured Hindley's dog Puppet, sometimes as a puppy. To help date the photos, detectives had a veterinary surgeon examine the dog to determine his age; the examination required a general anaesthetic from which Puppet did not recover. Hindley was furious, and accused the police of murdering the dog – one of the few occasions detectives witnessed any emotional response from her. Hindley wrote to her mother:

I feel as though my heart's been torn to pieces. I don't think anything could hurt me more than this has. The only consolation is that some moron might have got hold of Puppet and hurt him.

=== Trial ===
The fourteen-day trial began in a specially-prepared court room at Chester Assizes before Mr Justice Fenton Atkinson, on 19 April 1966. The dock was fitted with bulletproof glass to protect Brady and Hindley because it was feared that someone might try to kill them, such was the public outrage at the crimes. Other elaborate security precautions included a public address system costing £2,500 and telephone equipment costing £500. National and international journalists covering the trial booked up most of the city's hotel rooms. Onlookers – some travelling for hours – would stand outside Chester Assizes every day during the trial.

Brady and Hindley were charged with murdering Evans, Downey and Kilbride. The Attorney General, Sir Elwyn Jones, led the prosecution, assisted by William Mars-Jones. Brady was defended by Emlyn Hooson QC, the Liberal Member of Parliament (MP), and Hindley was defended by Godfrey Heilpern QC, recorder of Salford from 1964; both were experienced Queen's Counsel.

Smith was the chief prosecution witness. Before the trial, the News of the World newspaper offered £1,000 to Smith for the rights to his story; the American People magazine made a competing offer of £6,000 (equivalent to about £20,000 and £100,000 respectively in 2025). When Smith accepted the News of the World's offer – its editors had promised additional future payments for syndication and serialisation – he agreed to be paid £15 weekly until the trial, and £1,000 in a lump sum if Brady and Hindley were convicted. During the trial, the judge and defence barristers repeatedly questioned Smith and his wife about the nature of the arrangement. At first, Smith refused to name the newspaper, risking contempt of court; when he eventually identified the News of the World, Jones, as Attorney General, immediately promised an investigation. Comparing Smith's testimony with his initial statements to police, Atkinson – though describing the paper's actions as "gross interference with the course of justice" – concluded it was not "substantially affected" by the financial incentive. Jones decided not to charge the News of the World on similar grounds.

Both Brady and Hindley entered pleas of not guilty; Brady testified for over eight hours, Hindley for six. Brady admitted to striking Evans with the axe, but claimed that someone else had killed Evans, pointing to the pathologist's statement that his death had been "accelerated by strangulation" despite being the one accused of strangling him; Brady's "calm, undisguised arrogance did not endear him to the jury [and] neither did his pedantry", wrote Duncan Staff. Hindley denied any knowledge that the photographs of Saddleworth Moor found by police had been taken near the graves of their victims.

The sixteen-minute tape recording (Note: Brady made more than one copy of the tape recording; the version played in court was sixteen minutes in length.) of Downey, on which the voices of Brady and Hindley were audible, was played in open court. Hindley admitted that her attitude towards Downey was "brusque and cruel" but claimed that was only because she was afraid that someone might hear the child's screams. Hindley claimed that when Downey was being undressed she herself was "downstairs"; when the pornographic photographs were taken she was "looking out the window"; and that when Downey was being strangled she "was running a bath".

On 6 May, after having deliberated for a little over two hours, the jury found Brady guilty of all three murders, and Hindley guilty of the murders of Downey and Evans. As the death penalty for murder had been abolished six months earlier, the judge passed the only sentence that the law now allowed for murder: life imprisonment. Brady was sentenced to three concurrent life sentences and Hindley was given two, plus a concurrent seven-year term for harbouring Brady in the knowledge that he had murdered Kilbride. Brady was taken to Durham Prison and Hindley was sent to Holloway Prison.

In his closing remarks, Mr Justice Atkinson described the murders as "truly horrible" and the accused as "two sadistic killers of the utmost depravity"; he recommended they spend "a very long time" in prison before being considered for parole, but did not stipulate a tariff. Anyone sentenced to life imprisonment would be liable to spend the rest of his or her natural life in prison but could be paroled on life licence by the Home Secretary on recommendation of the Parole Board.

Atkinson described Brady as "wicked beyond belief" and said he saw no reasonable possibility of reform and suitability for parole for him, though he did not think the same necessarily true of Hindley once "removed from [Brady's] influence". Throughout the trial Brady and Hindley "stuck rigidly to their strategy of lying", and Hindley was later described as "a quiet, controlled, impassive witness who lied remorselessly".

=== Later investigation ===
Since the initial search of the moors began in October 1965, the national media had been keen to name missing children and teenagers from the region as possible victims of Brady and Hindley. These included Stephen Jennings, a three-year-old West Yorkshire boy who was last seen alive in December 1962; his body was found buried in a field in 1988, but the following year his father, William Jennings, was found guilty of his murder. Jennifer Tighe, a fourteen-year-old girl who disappeared from an Oldham children's home in December 1964, was mentioned in the press more than forty years later as a possible victim, but in April 2010 it was confirmed by Greater Manchester Police (GMP) that she was still alive. This followed claims in 2004 that Hindley had told another inmate that she and Brady had murdered a sixth victim, a teenage girl.

In 1985, Brady allegedly told Fred Harrison, a journalist working for The Sunday People, that he had killed Reade and Bennett, something police already suspected as both lived near Brady and Hindley and had disappeared during the first half of the 1960s. Greater Manchester Police reopened the investigation, now to be headed by Detective Chief Superintendent Peter Topping, head of GMP's Criminal Investigation Department (CID).

On 3 July 1985, DCS Topping visited Brady, then being held at Gartree Prison in Leicestershire, but found him "scornful of any suggestion that he had confessed to more murders". Police nevertheless decided to resume their search of Saddleworth Moor, once more using the photographs taken by Brady and Hindley to help them identify possible burial sites. In November 1986, Bennett's mother wrote to Hindley begging to know what had happened to her son, a letter that Hindley seemed to be "genuinely moved" by. It ended: "I am a simple woman, I work in the kitchens of Christie's Hospital. It has taken me five weeks labour to write this letter because it is so important to me that it is understood by you for what it is, a plea for help. Please, Miss Hindley, help me."

Police visited Hindley – then being held at Cookham Wood Prison in Kent – a few days after she received the letter, and although she refused to admit any involvement in the killings, she agreed to help by looking at photographs and maps to try to identify spots she had visited with Brady. She showed particular interest in photos of the area around Hollin Brown Knoll and Shiny Brook, but said that it was impossible to be sure of the locations without visiting the moor. Home Secretary Douglas Hurd agreed with Topping that a visit would be worth risking despite security problems presented by threats against Hindley. Writing in 1989, Topping said that he felt "quite cynical" about Hindley's motivation in helping police. Although Winnie Johnson's letter may have played a part, he believed that Hindley, knowing of Brady's "precarious" mental state, was concerned he might co-operate with police and reap any available public-approval benefit.

On 16 December 1986, Hindley made the first of two visits to assist the police search of the moor. Police closed all roads onto the moor, which was patrolled by 200 officers, some armed. Hindley and her solicitor left Cookham Wood at 4:30 a.m., flew to the moor by helicopter from an airfield near Maidstone, and then were driven, and walked, around the area until 3:00 pm. Hindley had difficulty connecting what she saw to her memories, and was apparently nervous of the helicopters flying overhead. The press described the visit as a "fiasco", a "publicity stunt" and a "mindless waste of money", but Topping defended it, saying "we needed a thorough systematic search of the moor ... It would never have been possible to carry out such a search in private."

On 19 December, David Smith, then 38, spent about four hours on the moor helping police identify additional areas to be searched. Topping continued to visit Hindley in prison, along with her solicitor Michael Fisher and her spiritual counsellor, Peter Timms, who had been a prison governor before becoming a Methodist minister.

On 10 February 1987, Hindley formally confessed to involvement in all five murders, but this was not made public for more than a month. The tape recording of her statement was over seventeen hours long; Topping described it as a "very well worked out performance in which, I believe, she told me just as much as she wanted me to know, and no more." He added that he "was struck by the fact that [in Hindley's telling] she was never there when the killings took place. She was in the car, over the brow of the hill, in the bathroom and even, in the case of the Evans murder, in the kitchen"; he felt he "had witnessed a great performance rather than a genuine confession". Topping was also among those who would go on to publicly express doubt over whether Hindley's reported remorse and rehabilitation were genuine rather than a mere ploy to boost her chances of parole.

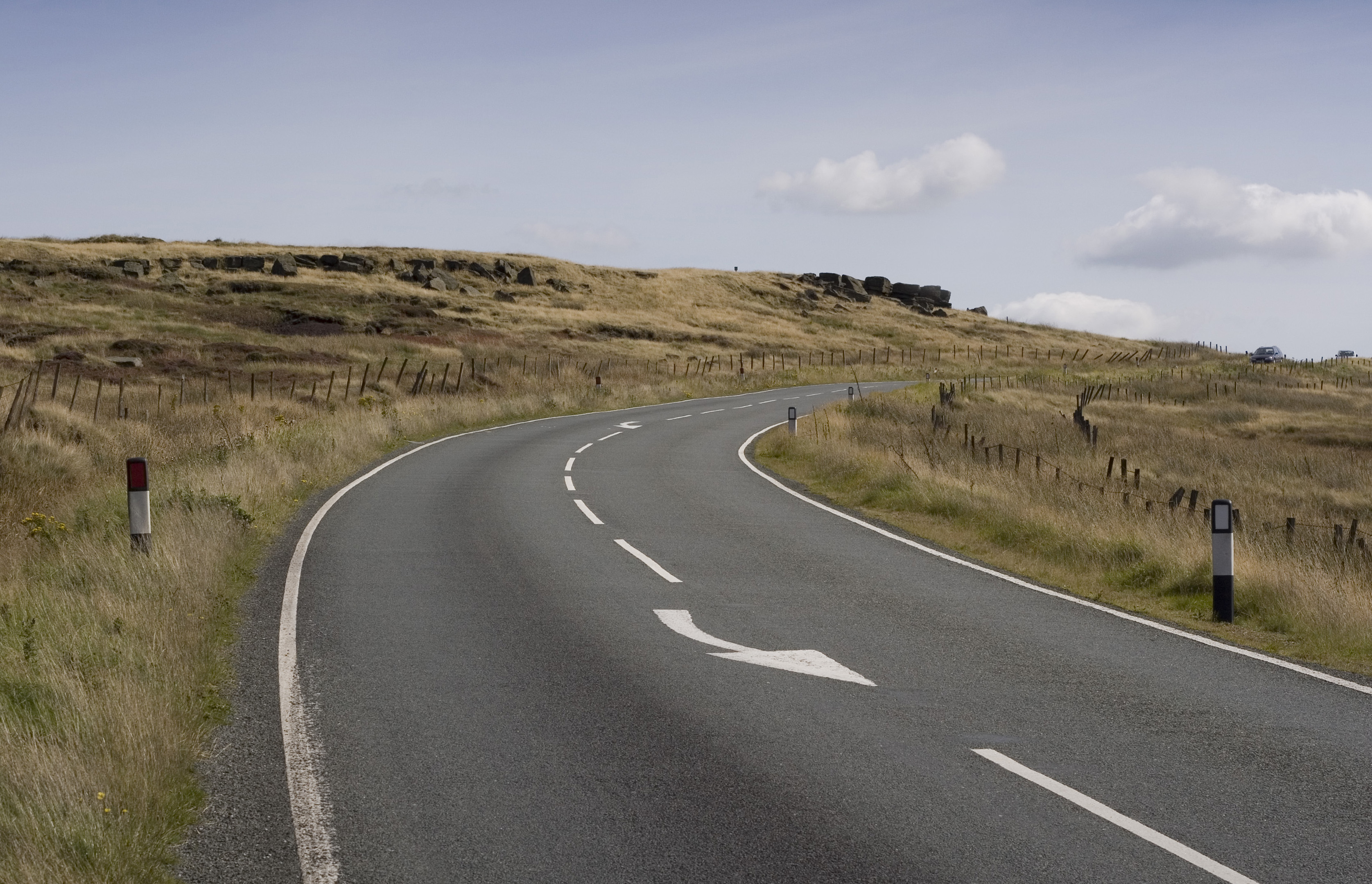
During the 1987 search for Pauline Reade and Keith Bennett, Hindley recalled seeing the rocks of Hollin Brown Knoll silhouetted against the night sky.

Police visited Brady in prison again and told him of Hindley's confession, which he initially refused to believe. Once presented with some of the details that Hindley had provided of Reade's abduction, Brady decided that he too was prepared to confess, but on one condition: that immediately afterwards he be given the means to commit suicide, a request with which it was impossible for the authorities to comply.

At about the same time, Johnson sent Hindley another letter, again pleading with her to assist police in finding the body of her son Keith. In the letter, Johnson was sympathetic to Hindley over the criticism surrounding her first visit. Hindley, who had not replied to the first letter, responded by thanking Johnson for both letters, explaining that her decision not to reply to the first resulted from the negative publicity that surrounded it. She claimed that, had Johnson written to her fourteen years earlier, she would have confessed and helped police. She also paid tribute to Topping and thanked Johnson for her sincerity. Hindley made her second visit to the moor in March 1987. This time, the level of security surrounding her visit was considerably higher. She stayed overnight in Manchester, at the flat of the police chief in charge of GMP training at Sedgley Park, and visited the moor twice. Hindley confirmed to police that the two areas in which they were concentrating their search—Hollin Brown Knoll and Hoe Grain—were correct, although she was unable to locate either of the graves. She did, though, later remember that as Reade was being buried she had been sitting next to her on a patch of grass and could see the rocks of Hollin Brown Knoll silhouetted against the night sky.

In April 1987, news of Hindley's confession became public. Amidst strong media interest, Lord Longford renewed his call for Hindley to be paroled, writing that continuing her detention to satisfy "mob emotion" was not right. Fisher persuaded Hindley to release a public statement, which touched on her reasons for denying her guilt previously, her religious experiences in prison and the letter from Johnson. She said that she saw no possibility of release and also exonerated Smith from any part in the murders other than that of Evans.

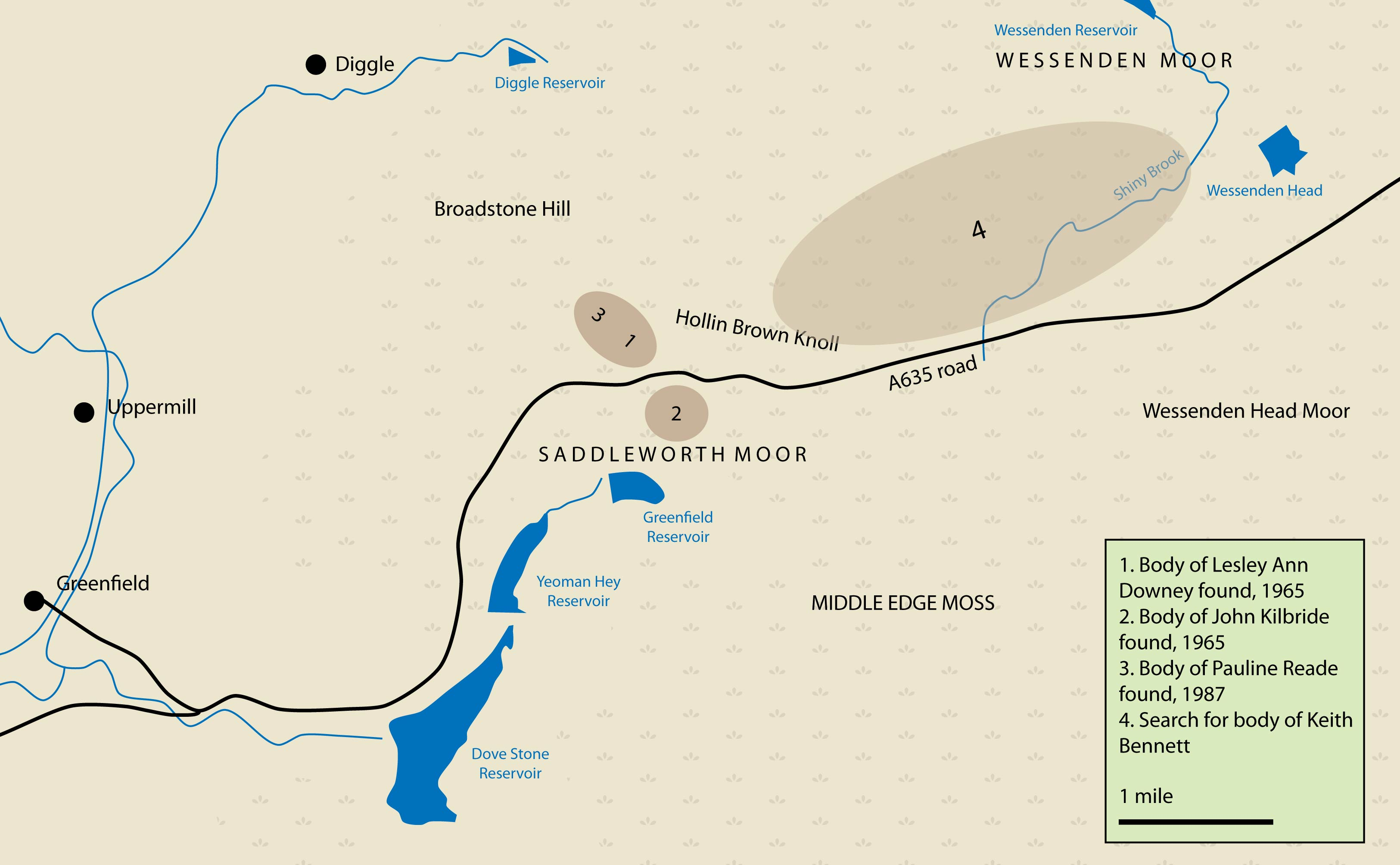
Saddleworth Moor showing where three of the victims' bodies were found, and the general area searched for the body of Keith Bennett

Over the next few months interest in the search waned, but Hindley's clue had focused efforts on a specific area. On 1 July, after more than 100 days of searching, they found Reade's body 3 feet (0.9 m) below the surface, 100 yards (90 m) from where Downey's had been found. Brady had been co-operating with police for some time, and when this news reached him he made a formal confession to Topping, and in a statement to the press said that he too would help police in their search. He was taken to the moor on 3 July but seemed to lose his bearings, blaming changes in the intervening years; the search was called off at 3:00 pm, by which time a large crowd of press and television reporters had gathered on the moor.

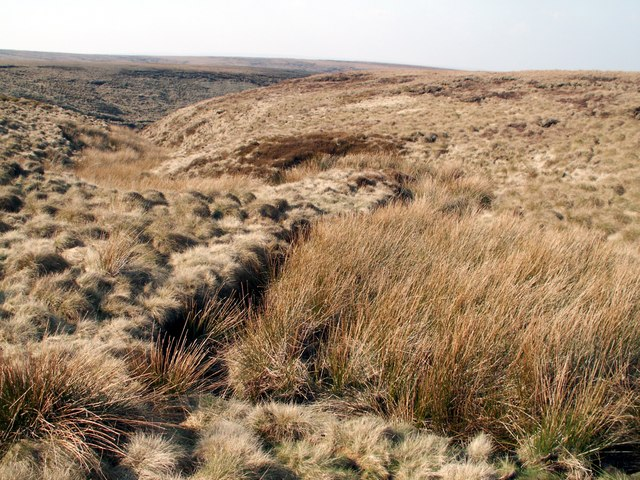
Hoe Grain leading to Shiny Brook, the area in which police believe Bennett's body is buried

Topping refused to allow Brady a second visit to the moor before police called off their search on 24 August. Brady was taken to the moor a second time on 8 December, and claimed to have located Bennett's burial site, but the body was never found.

Soon after his first visit to the moor, Brady wrote a letter to a BBC reporter, giving some sketchy details of five additional deaths that he claimed to have been involved in: a man in the Piccadilly area of Manchester, another victim on Saddleworth Moor, two more in Scotland and a woman whose body was allegedly dumped in a canal. Police, failing to discover any unsolved crimes matching the details that he supplied, decided that there was insufficient evidence to launch an official investigation. Hindley told Topping that she knew nothing of these killings.

Although Brady and Hindley had confessed to the murders of Reade and Bennett, the Director of Public Prosecutions (DPP) decided that nothing would be gained by a further trial; as both were already serving life sentences no further punishment could be inflicted.

In 2003, police launched Operation Maida, and again searched the moor for Bennett's body, this time using sophisticated resources such as a US reconnaissance satellite which could detect soil disturbances. In mid-2009, GMP said they had exhausted all avenues in the search for Bennett, that "only a major scientific breakthrough or fresh evidence would see the hunt for his body restart." It was stated that any further participation by Brady would be via a "walk through the moors virtually" using 3D modelling, rather than a visit by him to the moor. Donations from the public funded a search by volunteers from a Welsh search and rescue team in 2010.

In 2012, it was claimed that Brady may have given details of the location of Bennett's body to a prison visitor; a woman was subsequently arrested on suspicion of preventing the burial of a body without lawful excuse, but a few months later the Crown Prosecution Service announced that there was insufficient evidence to press charges. In 2017, the police asked a court to order that two locked briefcases owned by Brady be opened, arguing that they might contain clues to the location of Bennett's body; the application was declined on the grounds that no prosecution was likely to result.

On 30 September 2022, GMP began a search for human remains on the moor after receiving information from amateur investigator and author Russell Edwards, who had reportedly found a skull. After seeing a photograph of a jaw bone, a spokesperson for the police said, of the identity of the remains, that it was "far too early to be certain". On 1 October the police reported that no further remains had been found. On 7 October police announced they had ended their search without finding any sign of human remains.

== Incarceration ==
=== Brady ===
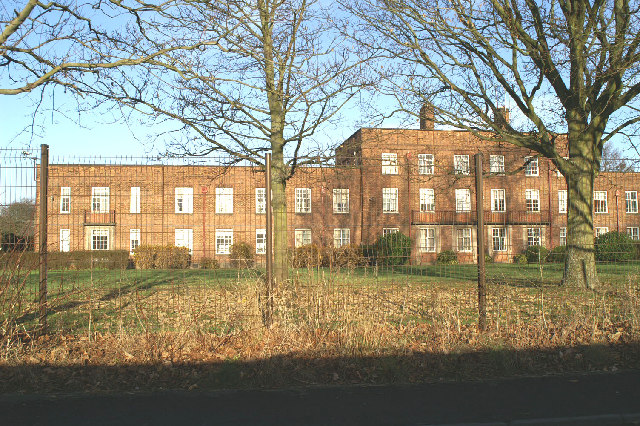
Ashworth Hospital, where Brady was incarcerated from 1985

Following his conviction, Brady was moved to Durham Prison, where he asked to live in solitary confinement. He spent nineteen years in mainstream prisons before being diagnosed as a psychopath in November 1985 and sent to the high-security Park Lane Hospital, now Ashworth Hospital, in Maghull, Merseyside; he made it clear that he never wanted to be released.

The trial judge recommended that Brady's life sentence should mean life, and successive Home Secretaries agreed with that decision. In 1982, the Lord Chief Justice Lord Lane said of Brady: "This is the case if ever there is to be one when a man should stay in prison till he dies." The November 2007 death of John Straffen, who had spent fifty-five years in prison for murdering three children, meant that Brady became the longest-serving prisoner in England and Wales.

Although Brady refused to work with Ashworth's psychiatrists, he occasionally corresponded with people outside the hospital – subject to prison authorities' censorship – including Lord Longford, writer Colin Wilson and various journalists. In one letter, written in 2005, Brady claimed that the murders were "merely an existential exercise of just over a year, which was concluded in December 1964". By then, he claimed, he and Hindley had turned their attention to armed robbery, for which they had begun to prepare by acquiring guns and vehicles. (Note: Forensic psychologist Chris Cowley writes, "So there was a gap in the murder cycle, this is not unusual with serial killers, but in most cases the gaps between murders get shorter, not longer. The so-called 'cooling-off' periods diminish on a timeline. In Brady's case, this did not happen: it went the other way. So their next killing [i.e. Evans] was out of sequence and it went badly wrong for pretty much everyone concerned, not least their victim.")

During several years of interactions with forensic psychologist Chris Cowley, including face-to-face meetings, Brady told him of an "aesthetic fascination [he had] with guns", despite his never having used one to kill. He complained bitterly about conditions at Ashworth, which he hated. In 1999, his right wrist was broken in what he claimed was an "hour-long, unprovoked attack" by staff. Brady subsequently went on hunger strike, but while English law allows patients to refuse treatment, those being treated for mental disorders under the Mental Health Act 1983 have no such right if the treatment is for their mental disorder. He was therefore force-fed and transferred to another hospital for tests after he fell ill. Brady recovered and in March 2000 asked for a judicial review of the legality of the decision to force-feed him, but was refused permission.

Myra gets the potentially fatal brain condition, whilst I have to fight simply to die. I have had enough. I want nothing, my objective is to die and release myself from this once and for all. So you see my death strike is rational and pragmatic. I'm only sorry I didn't do it decades ago, and I'm eager to leave this cesspit in a coffin.

In 2001, Brady wrote The Gates of Janus, which was published by American underground publisher Feral House. The book, Brady's analysis of serial murder and specific serial killers, sparked outrage when announced in the UK. In the book, Brady recounted his friendship in prison with the "teacup poisoner" Graham Young, who shared Brady's admiration for Nazi Germany.

According to Cowley, Brady regretted Hindley's imprisonment and the consequences of their actions, but not necessarily the crimes themselves. He saw no point in making any kind of public apology; instead, he "expresse[d] remorse through actions". Twenty years of transcribing classical texts into Braille came to an end when the authorities confiscated Brady's translation machine, for fear it might be used as a weapon. He once offered to donate one of his kidneys to "someone, anyone who needed one", but was blocked from doing so. According to Wilson, "it was because these attempts to express remorse were thrown back at him that he began to contemplate suicide." In 2006 officials intercepted fifty paracetamol pills hidden inside a hollowed-out crime novel sent to Brady by a female friend.

The mother of the remaining undiscovered victim, Keith Bennett, received a letter from Brady at the end of 2005 in which, she said, he claimed that he could take police to within 20 yards (18 m) of her son's body but authorities would not allow it. He did not refer directly to Bennett by name and did not claim he could take investigators directly to the grave, but spoke of the "clarity" of his recollections.

In 2012, Brady applied to be returned to prison, reiterating his desire to starve himself to death. At a mental health tribunal in June the following year, he claimed that he suffered not from paranoid schizophrenia, as his doctors at Ashworth maintained, but a personality disorder. Brady's application was rejected and the judge stated that he "continues to suffer from a mental disorder which is of a nature and degree which makes it appropriate for him to continue to receive medical treatment".

After receiving end-of-life care, Ian Brady died of restrictive pulmonary disease at Ashworth Hospital on 15 May 2017; the inquest found that he died of natural causes and that his hunger strike had not been a contributory factor. Brady had refused food and fluids for more than forty-eight hours on various occasions, causing him to be fitted with a nasogastric tube, although his inquest noted that his body mass index was not a cause for concern. He was cremated without a ceremony, and his ashes were disposed of at sea during the night.

=== Hindley ===
Hindley lodged an unsuccessful appeal against her conviction immediately after the trial. She corresponded with Brady by letter until 1971, when she ended their relationship. The two remained in sporadic contact for several months, but Hindley had fallen in love with one of her prison warders, Patricia Cairns. A former assistant governor claimed that such relationships were not unusual in Holloway at that time, as "many of the officers were gay, and involved in relationships either with one another or with inmates".

Hindley successfully petitioned to have her status as a Category A prisoner changed to Category B, which enabled Governor Dorothy Wing to take her on a walk around Hampstead Heath, part of her unofficial policy of reintroducing her charges to the outside world when she felt they were ready. The excursion caused a furore in the national press and earned Wing an official rebuke from the then-Home Secretary Robert Carr. With help from Cairns, and the outside contacts of another prisoner, Maxine Croft, Hindley planned a prison escape but it was thwarted when impressions of the prison keys were intercepted by an off-duty policeman. Cairns was sentenced to six years in jail for her part in the plot.

Hindley was told that she should spend twenty-five years in prison before being considered for parole. The Lord Chief Justice agreed with that recommendation in 1982, but in January 1985 Home Secretary Leon Brittan increased her tariff to thirty years. By that time Hindley claimed to be a reformed Catholic. Downey's mother was at the centre of a campaign to ensure that Hindley was never released from prison, and until her death in February 1999, she regularly gave television and newspaper interviews whenever Hindley's release was rumoured. In February 1985, Prime Minister Margaret Thatcher told Brittan that his proposed minimum sentences of thirty years for Hindley and forty years for Brady were too short, saying, "I do not think that either of these prisoners should ever be released from custody. Their crime was the most hideous and cruel in modern times."

In 1987, Hindley admitted that the plea for parole she had submitted to the Home Secretary eight years earlier was "on the whole ... a pack of lies", and to some reporters her co-operation in the searches on Saddleworth Moor "appeared a cynical gesture aimed at ingratiating herself to the parole authorities". Then-Home Secretary David Waddington imposed a whole life order on Hindley in July 1990, after she confessed to having been more involved in the murders than she had admitted. Hindley was not informed of the decision until 1994, when a Law Lords ruling obliged the Prison Service to inform all life sentence prisoners of the minimum period they must serve in prison before being considered for parole.

In 1996, the Parole Board recommended that Hindley be moved to an open prison. She rejected the idea and in early 1998 was moved to the medium-security Highpoint Prison; the Law Lords ruling left open the possibility of later freedom. Between December 1997 and March 2000, Hindley made three separate appeals against her whole life order, claiming she was a reformed woman and no longer a danger to society, but each was rejected by the courts.

When in 2002 another life sentence prisoner challenged the Home Secretary's power to set minimum terms, Hindley and hundreds of others, whose tariffs had been increased by politicians, looked likely to be released. Hindley's release seemed imminent and plans were made by supporters for her to be given a new identity. Home Secretary David Blunkett ordered Greater Manchester Police to find new charges against Hindley to prevent her release. The investigation was headed by Superintendent Tony Brett, and initially looked at charging Hindley with the murders of Reade and Bennett, but the advice given by government lawyers was that because of the DPP's decision taken fifteen years earlier, a new trial would probably be considered an abuse of process.

On 25 November 2002, the Law Lords agreed that judges, not politicians, should decide how long a criminal spends behind bars, and stripped the Home Secretary of the power to set minimum sentences. Just prior to this, on 15 November 2002, Hindley, aged 60 and a chain smoker, died from bronchial pneumonia at West Suffolk Hospital. She had been diagnosed with angina in 1999 and hospitalised after suffering a brain aneurysm. Camera crews "stood rank and file behind steel barriers" outside, but none of Hindley's relatives were among the small congregation of eight to ten people who attended a short service at Cambridge crematorium. Such was the strength of feeling more than thirty-five years after the murders that a reported twenty local undertakers refused to handle her cremation. Four months later, her ashes were scattered by her ex-partner, Patricia Cairns, less than 10 miles (16 km) from Saddleworth Moor in Stalybridge Country Park. The Manchester Evening News reported on possible fears that this would result in visitors choosing to avoid or vandalise the park.

== Aftermath ==
David Smith became "reviled by the people of Manchester" for financially profiting from the murders, and with public suspicion that he had been directly involved in the murders. During the trial, Maureen – eight months pregnant – was attacked in the lift of the building in which both she and Smith lived. Their home was vandalised, they regularly received hate mail and Maureen wrote that she could not let her children out of her sight when they were small. After declining to prosecute the News of the World, Attorney General Sir Elwyn Jones came under political pressure to impose new regulations on the press, but was reluctant to legislate on "chequebook journalism". Instead, he accepted the offer of the Press Council to produce a "declaration of principle" which was published in November 1966 and included rules forbidding criminal witnesses being paid or interviewed – but the News of the World promptly rejected the declaration and the council had no power to enforce its provisions.

After stabbing another man during a fight, in an attack he claimed was triggered by the abuse he had suffered since the trial, Smith was sentenced to three years in prison in 1969. That same year his children were taken into the care of the local authority. Maureen moved from Underwood Court to a bedsit in another district and found work in a department store. Subjected to whispering campaigns and petitions to remove her from the estate where she lived, Maureen received no support from her family – her mother had supported Myra during the trial and did not contact Maureen again until the early 1970s.

On his release from prison, Smith moved in with a fifteen-year-old girl who became his second wife and won custody of his three sons. Maureen managed to repair the relationship with her mother and moved into a council property in Gorton. She divorced Smith in 1973, and married a lorry driver, Bill Scott, with whom she had a daughter.

In 1980, Maureen suffered a brain haemorrhage; Hindley was allowed to visit her in hospital, but arrived an hour after her death. Sheila and Patrick Kilbride, who were by then divorced, attended Maureen's funeral thinking that Hindley might be there; Patrick mistook Bill Scott's daughter from his first marriage for Hindley and tried to attack her. Shortly before her death at the age of 70, Sheila said: "If she [Hindley] ever comes out of jail I'll kill her." It was a threat repeated by her son Danny.

In 1972, Smith was acquitted of the murder of his father, who had been suffering from terminal cancer. He pleaded guilty to manslaughter and was sentenced to two days' detention. He remarried and moved to Lincolnshire with his three sons, and was exonerated of any participation in the murders by Hindley's confession in 1987. In 2011, he co-authored the book Witness with biographer Carol Ann Lee. Smith died from cancer in Ireland in 2012.

Reade's mother was admitted to Springfield Mental Hospital in Manchester. She was present, under heavy sedation, at the funeral of her daughter on 7 August 1987. Five years after their son was murdered, Sheila and Patrick Kilbride divorced. Ann West, the mother of Lesley Ann Downey, died in February 1999 after a long battle against cancer. She had been at the centre of a campaign to ensure that Hindley remained in prison, and doctors said that the stress had contributed to the severity of her illness. Bennett's mother continued to visit Saddleworth Moor, where it is believed that Bennett is buried. She died of cancer in August 2012 at the age of 78.

Manchester City Council decided in 1987 to demolish the house in which Brady and Hindley had lived on Wardle Brook Avenue, and where Downey and Evans were murdered, citing "excessive media interest [in the property] creating unpleasantness for residents".

In November 2017 it was revealed that, without the knowledge of her family, some of Reade's remains, including her jawbone, had been kept at the University of Leeds by Greater Manchester Police. GMP apologised to the Reade family. In October 2018 her remains were re-buried at her grave in Gorton Cemetery, Manchester.

=== Lasting notoriety ===
The photographs and tape recording of the torture of Lesley Ann Downey exhibited in court, and the nonchalant responses of Brady and Hindley, helped to ensure their lasting notoriety. Brady, who said that he did not want to be released, was rarely mentioned in the news, but Hindley's insistent desire to be released contributed to her continuing status as a figure of public hate–especially as she failed to confess to involvement in the Reade and Bennett murders for twenty years. Hindley's role in the crimes also violated gender norms: her betrayal of the maternal role fed public perceptions of her "inherent evil", and made her a "poster girl" for moral panics about serial murder and paedophilia in subsequent decades. Her often reprinted mugshot, taken shortly after she was arrested, is described by some commentators as similar to the mythical Medusa and, according to author Helen Birch, has become "synonymous with the idea of feminine evil".

At the 1997 Sensation art exhibition, the painting Myra caused controversy, as it was a reproduction of Hindley's mugshot, shortly after she was arrested, composed of children's handprints. Given Hindley's status as co-defendant in the first serial murder trial held since the abolition of the death penalty, retribution was a common theme among those who were determined that she should not be released from prison. Even Hindley's mother insisted that she should die in prison, partly for fear for Hindley's safety. Some commentators expressed the view that of the two, Hindley was the "more evil".

Lord Longford, a Catholic convert, campaigned to secure the release of "celebrated" criminals, and Hindley in particular, which earned him constant derision from the public and the tabloid media. He described Hindley as a "delightful" person and said "you could loathe what people did but should not loathe what they were because human personality was sacred even though human behaviour was very often appalling." Tabloid newspapers branded him a "loony" and a "do-gooder" for supporting Hindley, whom they described as evil. Hindley became a long-running source of material for the press, which printed embellished tales of her "cushy" life at the "5-star" Cookham Wood Prison and her liaisons with prison staff and other inmates.

The book The Loathsome Couple by Edward Gorey (Mead, 1977) was inspired by the Moors murders. Manchester band the Smiths' song "Suffer Little Children", from their 1984 self-titled debut album, was also inspired by the case. The case featured in two television dramas in 2006, See No Evil: The Moors Murders and Longford. The episode "White Bear", from the Netflix anthology series Black Mirror (then owned and broadcast on the British network, Channel 4), was partially inspired by the murders.

== See also ==
- Fred and Rosemary West – Husband-and-wife British serial killers active in Gloucester between 1967 and 1987. It was first reported in May 1995 that Hindley and Rosemary—who were both incarcerated in HMP Durham at the time—had formed a "friendship". Hindley denied the claims. Rosemary acknowledged that they knew each other from being on the same wing, but denied further speculation that the two were “having an affair”.
- Maria Pearson – Currently Britain's longest-serving female prisoner, noted for only serving one year less than Myra Hindley as of 2023
- List of solved missing person cases: 1950–1999
- Thrill killing
- List of serial killers in the United Kingdom
