= What Difference Does It Make? =

Single by the Smiths

from the album The Smiths
- B-side: "Back to the Old House"; "These Things Take Time"
- Released: 16 January 1984
- Recorded: October 1983
- Studio: Pluto (Manchester, England)
- Genre: Alternative rock; post-punk
- Length: 3:51 (album version); 3:25 (single edit)
- Label: Rough Trade
- Composer: Johnny Marr
- Lyricist: Morrissey
- Producer: John Porter

The Smiths singles chronology
"This Charming Man" (1983)	"What Difference Does It Make?" (1984)	"Heaven Knows I'm Miserable Now" (1984)

Original cover
- Artwork with Morrissey re-enacting the image of Terence Stamp

Professional ratings
Review scores
Source	Rating
AllMusic	3/5 stars

"What Difference Does It Make?" is a song by the English rock band the Smiths, written by singer Morrissey and guitarist Johnny Marr. It was the band's third single and is featured on their self-titled debut album (1984). A different version, recorded for the John Peel Show on BBC Radio 1, is included in the compilation album Hatful of Hollow (also 1984).

The song was one of the band's first significant chart hits, peaking at No. 12 in the UK singles chart.

== Background ==
The character Ray Smith in the Jack Kerouac novel The Dharma Bums repeatedly says "What difference does it make?" as well as "Pretty girls make graves", the title of another track featured on The Smiths.

"What Difference Does It Make?" was released without an accompanying music video. Speaking to Tony Fletcher on The Tube in 1984, Morrissey remarked that he felt that the video market was something that was going to "die very quickly", and that he wanted to "herald the death" of it.

== Cover artwork ==
The single cover is a photograph of Terence Stamp, taken on the set of the film The Collector (1965). Initially, Stamp denied permission for the still to be used, and some pressings featured Morrissey in a re-enacted scene. In the re-enactment, Morrissey is holding a glass of milk, as opposed to a chloroform pad in the original. However, Stamp soon changed his mind, and the original cover was reinstated.

== Track listings ==
7-inch RT146
No.	Title	Length
1.	"What Difference Does It Make?" (single edit)	3:25
2.	"Back to the Old House"	3:04

12-inch RTT146/CD RTT146CD
No.	Title	Length
1.	"What Difference Does It Make?"	3:50
2.	"Back to the Old House"	3:04
3.	"These Things Take Time"	2:20

== Personnel ==
- Morrissey – vocals
- Johnny Marr – guitars
- Andy Rourke – bass guitar
- Mike Joyce – drums

== Charts ==
Chart	Peak position
Ireland (IRMA)	12
UK Singles (Official Charts)	12
UK Indie	1

== Certifications ==
Region	Certification	Certified units/sales
United Kingdom (BPI)	Silver	200,000^{‡}
^{‡} Sales+streaming figures based on certification alone.
