= List of UK top-ten albums in 2013 =

List according to the UK Albums Chart

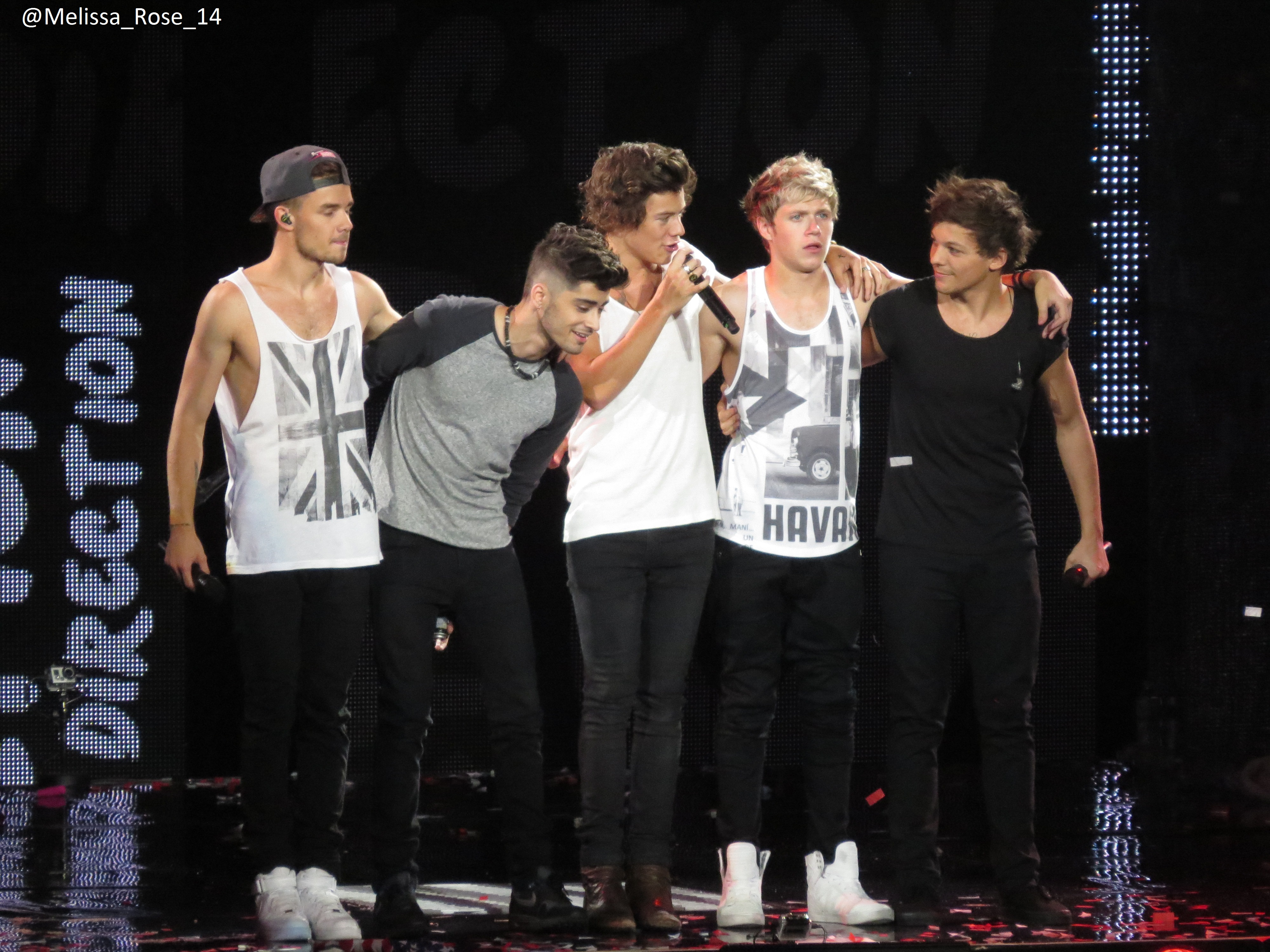
One Direction had the UK's best selling album of 2013 with Midnight Memories, which spent two weeks at the summit of the album chart and lasted six weeks in the top 10 altogether.

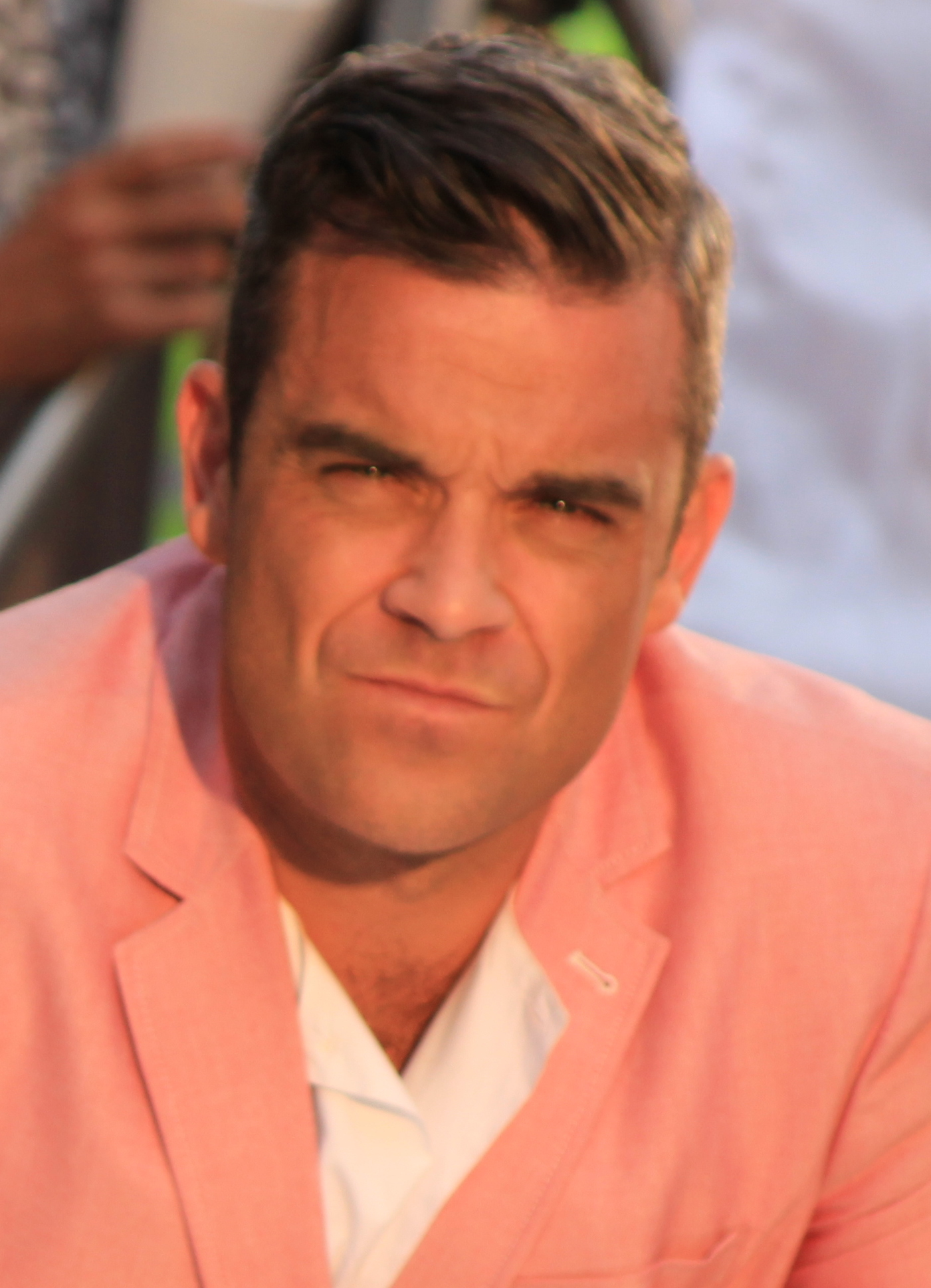
In November of this year, Robbie Williams' album Swings Both Ways became the 1000th number-one in the UK Albums Chart.

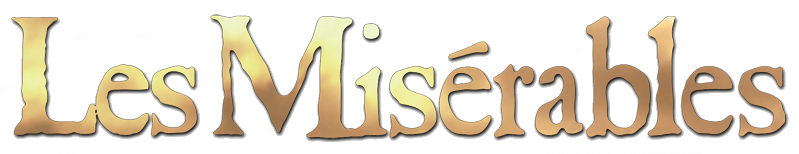
The soundtrack album from the movie Les Misérables went to number-one in the UK in January 2013. It spent 13 weeks in the top 10 and lasted four non-consecutive weeks at the top spot.

The UK Albums Chart is one of many music charts compiled by the Official Charts Company that calculates the best-selling albums of the week in the United Kingdom. Since 2004 the chart has been based on the sales of both physical albums and digital downloads. This list shows albums that peaked in the Top 10 of the UK Albums Chart during 2013, as well as albums which peaked in 2012 and 2014 but were in the top 10 in 2013. The entry date is when the album appeared in the top 10 for the first time (week ending, as published by the Official Charts Company, which is six days after the chart is announced).

One-hundred and seventy-two albums were in the top ten this year. One album from 2011 and seventeen albums from 2012 remained in the top 10 for several weeks at the beginning of the year, while Beyoncé by Beyoncé was released in 2013 but did not reach its peak until 2014. Halcyon by Ellie Goulding debuted in 2012 and re-entered the top 10 in 2013, but its peak position was not until 2014. Six artists scored multiple entries in the top 10 in 2013. The 1975, Bastille, Frank Turner, James Arthur and Kodaline were among the many artists who achieved their first UK charting top 10 album in 2013.

18 Months by Calvin Harris returned to the top spot in the first week of 2013. The first new number-one album of the year was Les Misérables: Highlights from the Motion Picture Soundtrack by the Les Misérables cast. Overall, thirty-five different albums peaked at number-one in 2013, with thirty-five unique artists hitting that position.

== Background ==
=== Multiple entries ===
One-hundred and seventy-two albums charted in the top 10 in 2013, with one-hundred and fifty-two albums reaching their peak this year (including The Complete Greatest Hits which charted in previous years but reached a peak on its latest chart run).

Six artists scored multiple entries in the top 10 in 2013. Andrea Bocelli, Jake Bugg, Justin Timberlake, Michael Bublé, One Direction and Robbie Williams were the acts who had two top 10 albums this year. Andrea Bocelli and Justin Timberlake's two entries were both released this year, with Christmas by Michael Bublé returning after making the top ten before.

=== Chart debuts ===
Forty-six artists achieved their first top 10 album in 2013 as a lead artist.

The following table (collapsed on desktop site) does not include acts who had previously charted as part of a group and secured their first top 10 solo album, or featured appearances on compilations or other artists recordings.

Artist	Number of top 10s	First entry	Chart position	Other entries
Les Misérables cast	1	Les Misérables: Highlights from the Motion Picture Soundtrack	1	—
The Lumineers	1	The Lumineers	8	—
Everything Everything	1	Arc	5	—
A$AP Rocky	1	Live. Love. A$AP	7	—
I Am Kloot	1	Let It All In	10	—
Frightened Rabbit	1	Pedestrian Verse	9	—
Atoms for Peace	1	Amok	5	—
Josh Groban	1	All That Echoes	9	—
Bastille	1	Bad Blood	1	—
Laura Mvula	1	Sing to the Moon	9	—
Imagine Dragons	1	Night Visions	2	—
Bring Me the Horizon	1	Sempiternal	3	—
Frank Turner	1	Tape Deck Heart	2	—
Rudimental	1	Home	1	—
Passenger	1	All the Little Lights	3	—
Bo Bruce	1	Before I Sleep	10	—
Gabrielle Aplin	1	English Rain	2	—
30 Seconds to Mars	1	Love, Lust, Faith and Dreams	5	—
Demi Lovato	1	Demi	10	—
Stooshe	1	London with the Lights On	8	—
Disclosure	1	Settle	1	—
Miles Kane	1	Don't Forget Who You Are	8	—
Boards of Canada	1	Tomorrow's Harvest	7	—
Kodaline	1	In a Perfect World	3	—
J. Cole	1	Born Sinner	7	—
Tom Odell	1	Long Way Down	1	—
Robin Thicke	1	Blurred Lines	1	—
Jahméne Douglas	1	Love Never Fails	1	—
Richard & Adam	1	The Impossible Dream	1	—
The Civil Wars	1	The Civil Wars	2	—
Naughty Boy	1	Hotel Cabana	2	—
The 1975	1	The 1975	1	—
Ariana Grande	1	Yours Truly	7	—
London Grammar	1	If You Wait	2	—
The Strypes	1	Snapshot	5	—
Avicii	1	True	2	—
Deaf Havana	1	Old Souls	9	—
Birdy	1	Fire Within	8	—
Chvrches	1	The Bones of What You Believe	9	—
Haim	1	Days Are Gone	1	—
Lucy Spraggan	1	Join the Club	7	—
John Newman	1	Tribute	1	—
Andrea Begley	1	The Message	7	—
Lorde	1	Pure Heroine	4	—
Union J	1	Union J	6	—
James Arthur	1	James Arthur	2	—

Notes

Johnny Marr had great success as a member of The Smiths, including four albums which reached the top two. He scored a top 10 hit with his debut solo album The Messenger in 2013. After three previous attempts, will.i.am achieved a first top 10 peaking album outside The Black Eyed Peas, as #willpower landed at number 3.

Agnetha Fältskog secured the first top 10 album of her solo career, A which placed at number six. She was best known for her hits with the four-piece ABBA. Shane Filan moved on from Westlife and made the top 10 with You and Me, a number 6 hit.

=== Soundtracks ===
The soundtrack album for the film Les Misérables was the only soundtrack recording to reach the top ten in 2013, spending four weeks at number-one in total.

=== Best-selling albums ===
One Direction had the best-selling album of the year with Midnight Memories. The album spent six weeks in the top 10 (including two weeks at number one), sold over million copies and was certified by the BPI. Our Version of Events by Emeli Sandé came in second place. Michael Bublé's To Be Loved, Swings Both Ways from Robbie Williams and Right Place Right Time by Olly Murs made up the top five. Albums by Bruno Mars, Rod Stewart, Arctic Monkeys, Gary Barlow and Ellie Goulding were also in the top ten best-selling albums of the year.

== Top-ten albums ==
Key

Symbol	Meaning
‡	Album peaked in 2011 or 2012 but still in chart in 2013.
♦	Album released in 2012 or 2013 but peaked in 2014.
(#)	Year-end top-ten album position and rank
Entered	The date that the album first appeared in the chart.
Peak	Highest position that the album reached in the UK Albums Chart.

Entered (week ending)	Weeks in top 10	Album	Artist	Peak	Peak reached (week ending)	Weeks at peak
Albums in 2011
24 September 2011	49	+ ‡	Ed Sheeran	1	24 September 2011	3
Albums in 2012
25 February 2012	67	Our Version of Events ‡ (#2)	Emeli Sandé	1	25 February 2012	10
2 June 2012	5	Some Nights ‡	fun.	4	10 November 2012	1
9 June 2012	15	Fall to Grace ‡	Paloma Faith	2	9 June 2012	3
8 September 2012	4	Ora ‡	Rita Ora	1	8 September 2012	1
29 September 2012	17	The Truth About Love ‡	Pink	2	29 September 2012	1
6 October 2012	16	Babel ‡	Mumford & Sons	1	6 October 2012	3
20 October 2012	22	Halcyon ♦ (#10)	Ellie Goulding	1	11 January 2014	3
27 October 2012	16	Jake Bugg ‡	Jake Bugg	1	27 October 2012	1
3 November 2012	4	Red ‡	Taylor Swift	1	3 November 2012	1
10 November 2012	15	18 Months ‡	Calvin Harris	1	10 November 2012	2
17 November 2012	10	Take the Crown ‡	Robbie Williams	1	17 November 2012	1
24 November 2012	10	Take Me Home ‡	One Direction	1	24 November 2012	1
1 December 2012	14	Unapologetic ‡	Rihanna	1	1 December 2012	1
1 December 2012	10	Christmas ‡	Michael Bublé	2	15 December 2012	1
8 December 2012	16	Right Place Right Time ‡ (#5)	Olly Murs	1	8 December 2012	2
8 December 2012	5	The Very Best of Neil Diamond: The Original Studio Recordings ‡	Neil Diamond	5	15 December 2012	2
22 December 2012	24	Unorthodox Jukebox ‡ (#6)	Bruno Mars	1	22 December 2012	1
Albums in 2013
19 January 2013	13	Les Misérables: Highlights from the Motion Picture Soundtrack	Les Misérables cast	1	26 January 2013	4
19 January 2013	2	The Lumineers	The Lumineers	8	6 April 2013	1
26 January 2013	1	Arc	Everything Everything	5	26 January 2013	1
26 January 2013	1	Live. Love. A$AP	A$AP Rocky	7	26 January 2013	1
2 February 2013	1	Let It All In	I Am Kloot	10	2 February 2013	1
9 February 2013	3	Opposites	Biffy Clyro	1	9 February 2013	1
9 February 2013	3	Rumours	Fleetwood Mac	3	9 February 2013	1
9 February 2013	1	Believe Acoustic	Justin Bieber	5	9 February 2013	1
9 February 2013	3	Passione	Andrea Bocelli	7	16 February 2013	1
16 February 2013	1	Anna	Courteeners	6	16 February 2013	1
16 February 2013	1	Pedestrian Verse	Frightened Rabbit	9	16 February 2013	1
23 February 2013	2	Holy Fire	Foals	2	23 February 2013	1
2 March 2013	1	Push the Sky Away	Nick Cave and the Bad Seeds	3	2 March 2013	1
2 March 2013	2	Every Kingdom	Ben Howard	4	2 March 2013	2
9 March 2013	1	Amok	Atoms for Peace	5	9 March 2013	1
9 March 2013	1	Both Sides Now	Michael Ball	8	9 March 2013	1
9 March 2013	1	All That Echoes	Josh Groban	9	9 March 2013	1
9 March 2013	1	The Messenger	Johnny Marr	10	9 March 2013	1
16 March 2013	23	Bad Blood	Bastille	1	16 March 2013	3
16 March 2013	5	Graffiti on the Train	Stereophonics	3	16 March 2013	1
16 March 2013	1	Girl Who Got Away	Dido	5	16 March 2013	1
16 March 2013	1	Sing to the Moon	Laura Mvula	9	16 March 2013	1
23 March 2013	5	The Next Day	David Bowie	1	23 March 2013	1
23 March 2013	2	What About Now	Bon Jovi	2	23 March 2013	1
23 March 2013	1	Exile	Hurts	9	23 March 2013	1
30 March 2013	7	The 20/20 Experience	Justin Timberlake	1	30 March 2013	3
30 March 2013	1	Bloodsports	Suede	10	30 March 2013	1
6 April 2013	1	Delta Machine	Depeche Mode	2	6 April 2013	1
6 April 2013	1	Comedown Machine	The Strokes	10	6 April 2013	1
13 April 2013	8	Night Visions	Imagine Dragons	2	13 April 2013	1
13 April 2013	1	Sempiternal	Bring Me the Horizon	3	13 April 2013	1
13 April 2013	2	Bat Out of Hell	Meat Loaf	9	13 April 2013	2
20 April 2013	2	Paramore	Paramore	1	20 April 2013	1
20 April 2013	1	Overgrown	James Blake	8	20 April 2013	1
27 April 2013	17	To Be Loved (#3)	Michael Bublé	1	27 April 2013	2
27 April 2013	2	Save Rock and Roll	Fall Out Boy	2	27 April 2013	1
27 April 2013	1	Mosquito	Yeah Yeah Yeahs	9	27 April 2013	1
4 May 2013	1	Tape Deck Heart	Frank Turner	2	4 May 2013	1
4 May 2013	2	#willpower	will.i.am	3	4 May 2013	1
11 May 2013	19	Home	Rudimental	1	11 May 2013	1
11 May 2013	21	All the Little Lights	Passenger	3	6 July 2013	3
11 May 2013	1	Before I Sleep	Bo Bruce	10	11 May 2013	1
18 May 2013	4	The Shocking Miss Emerald	Caro Emerald	1	18 May 2013	1
18 May 2013	1	Didn't It Rain	Hugh Laurie	3	18 May 2013	1
18 May 2013	1	The Minutes	Alison Moyet	5	18 May 2013	1
18 May 2013	1	Golden	Lady Antebellum	7	18 May 2013	1
25 May 2013	17	Time (#7)	Rod Stewart	1	25 May 2013	1
25 May 2013	2	English Rain	Gabrielle Aplin	2	25 May 2013	1
25 May 2013	1	Modern Vampires of the City	Vampire Weekend	3	25 May 2013	1
25 May 2013	2	A	Agnetha Fältskog	6	25 May 2013	2
1 June 2013	7	Random Access Memories	Daft Punk	1	1 June 2013	2
1 June 2013	1	Trouble Will Find Me	The National	3	1 June 2013	1
1 June 2013	1	The Conversation	Texas	4	1 June 2013	1
1 June 2013	1	Love, Lust, Faith and Dreams	30 Seconds to Mars	5	1 June 2013	1
1 June 2013	1	Demi	Demi Lovato	10	1 June 2013	1
8 June 2013	1	Once I Was an Eagle	Laura Marling	3	8 June 2013	1
8 June 2013	1	London with the Lights On	Stooshe	8	8 June 2013	1
15 June 2013	6	Settle	Disclosure	1	15 June 2013	1
15 June 2013	1	...Like Clockwork	Queens of the Stone Age	2	15 June 2013	1
15 June 2013	1	Don't Forget Who You Are	Miles Kane	8	15 June 2013	1
22 June 2013	2	13	Black Sabbath	1	22 June 2013	1
22 June 2013	1	Be	Beady Eye	2	22 June 2013	1
22 June 2013	1	Tomorrow's Harvest	Boards of Canada	7	22 June 2013	1
22 June 2013	1	The Complete Greatest Hits	Eagles	9	22 June 2013	1
22 June 2013	1	Bula Quo!	Status Quo	10	22 June 2013	1
29 June 2013	2	Yeezus	Kanye West	1	29 June 2013	1
29 June 2013	4	In a Perfect World	Kodaline	3	29 June 2013	1
29 June 2013	1	Born Sinner	J. Cole	7	29 June 2013	1
29 June 2013	1	Kveikur	Sigur Rós	9	29 June 2013	1
6 July 2013	4	Long Way Down	Tom Odell	1	6 July 2013	1
13 July 2013	1	The Weight of Your Love	Editors	6	13 July 2013	1
20 July 2013	5	Magna Carta Holy Grail	Jay-Z	1	20 July 2013	1
27 July 2013	2	Blurred Lines	Robin Thicke	1	27 July 2013	1
27 July 2013	1	Electric	Pet Shop Boys	3	27 July 2013	1
3 August 2013	3	Love Never Fails	Jahmene Douglas	1	3 August 2013	1
3 August 2013	4	Nothing but the Beat	David Guetta	6	10 August 2013	1
10 August 2013	7	The Impossible Dream	Richard & Adam	1	10 August 2013	4
10 August 2013	1	Greatest Hits	Scouting for Girls	8	10 August 2013	1
17 August 2013	1	The Civil Wars	The Civil Wars	2	17 August 2013	1
24 August 2013	1	Big TV	White Lies	4	24 August 2013	1
31 August 2013	1	Where You Stand	Travis	3	31 August 2013	1
31 August 2013	1	Paradise Valley	John Mayer	4	31 August 2013	1
7 September 2013	2	Hail to the King	Avenged Sevenfold	1	7 September 2013	1
7 September 2013	2	Hotel Cabana	Naughty Boy	2	7 September 2013	1
7 September 2013	1	The Bootleg Series Vol. 10: Another Self Portrait (1969–1971)	Bob Dylan	5	7 September 2013	1
7 September 2013	1	Right Thoughts, Right Words, Right Action	Franz Ferdinand	6	7 September 2013	1
7 September 2013	1	Studio Zoo	Newton Faulkner	10	7 September 2013	1
14 September 2013	3	The 1975	The 1975	1	14 September 2013	1
14 September 2013	2	Hesitation Marks	Nine Inch Nails	2	14 September 2013	1
14 September 2013	1	Roaring 20s	Rizzle Kicks	3	14 September 2013	1
14 September 2013	1	Yours Truly	Ariana Grande	7	14 September 2013	1
14 September 2013	1	Sequel to the Prequel	Babyshambles	10	14 September 2013	1
21 September 2013	16	AM (#8)	Arctic Monkeys	1	21 September 2013	2
21 September 2013	19	If You Wait	London Grammar	2	21 September 2013	1
21 September 2013	1	Tales of Us	Goldfrapp	4	21 September 2013	1
21 September 2013	1	Snapshot	The Strypes	5	21 September 2013	1
28 September 2013	11	True	Avicii	2	28 September 2013	2
28 September 2013	1	The Diving Board	Elton John	3	28 September 2013	1
28 September 2013	1	Rewind the Film	Manic Street Preachers	4	28 September 2013	1
28 September 2013	1	Ketevan	Katie Melua	6	28 September 2013	1
28 September 2013	1	From Here to Now to You	Jack Johnson	7	28 September 2013	1
28 September 2013	1	Old Souls	Deaf Havana	9	28 September 2013	1
5 October 2013	3	Mechanical Bull	Kings of Leon	1	5 October 2013	1
5 October 2013	3	Nothing Was the Same	Drake	2	5 October 2013	1
5 October 2013	2	Alive	Jessie J	3	5 October 2013	1
5 October 2013	1	Tattoos	Jason Derulo	5	5 October 2013	1
5 October 2013	1	Fire Within	Birdy	8	5 October 2013	1
5 October 2013	1	The Bones of What You Believe	Chvrches	9	5 October 2013	1
12 October 2013	2	Days Are Gone	Haim	1	12 October 2013	1
12 October 2013	2	The 20/20 Experience – 2 of 2	Justin Timberlake	2	12 October 2013	1
12 October 2013	1	Fortress	Alter Bridge	6	12 October 2013	1
12 October 2013	1	The Fifth	Dizzee Rascal	10	12 October 2013	1
19 October 2013	2	Bangerz	Miley Cyrus	1	19 October 2013	1
19 October 2013	2	Brand New Machine	Chase & Status	2	19 October 2013	1
19 October 2013	1	Join the Club	Lucy Spraggan	7	19 October 2013	1
19 October 2013	1	Too Weird to Live, Too Rare to Die!	Panic! at the Disco	10	19 October 2013	1
26 October 2013	7	Tribute	John Newman	1	26 October 2013	1
26 October 2013	1	Lightning Bolt	Pearl Jam	2	26 October 2013	1
26 October 2013	1	New	Paul McCartney	3	26 October 2013	1
26 October 2013	3	Closer to the Truth	Cher	4	26 October 2013	1
26 October 2013	1	Perhaps Love	Jonathan and Charlotte	5	26 October 2013	1
26 October 2013	1	Living for the Weekend	The Saturdays	10	26 October 2013	1
2 November 2013	4	Prism	Katy Perry	1	2 November 2013	1
2 November 2013	5	Moon Landing	James Blunt	2	2 November 2013	1
2 November 2013	1	Love in Portofino	Andrea Bocelli	5	2 November 2013	1
2 November 2013	1	The Message	Andrea Begley	7	2 November 2013	1
9 November 2013	1	Reflektor	Arcade Fire	1	9 November 2013	1
9 November 2013	6	Pure Heroine	Lorde	4	9 November 2013	1
9 November 2013	1	Union J	Union J	6	9 November 2013	1
16 November 2013	8	The Marshall Mathers LP 2	Eminem	1	16 November 2013	1
16 November 2013	3	James Arthur	James Arthur	2	16 November 2013	1
16 November 2013	1	Demonstration	Tinie Tempah	3	16 November 2013	1
16 November 2013	3	Music of the Night	André Rieu & The Johann Strauss Orchestra	4	16 November 2013	1
16 November 2013	1	Saturday Night at the Movies	The Overtones	5	16 November 2013	1
16 November 2013	1	You and Me	Shane Filan	6	16 November 2013	1
16 November 2013	6	The Nation's Favourite Elvis Songs	Elvis Presley	5	23 November 2013	2
16 November 2013	1	Word of Mouth	The Wanted	9	16 November 2013	1
23 November 2013	2	Artpop	Lady Gaga	1	23 November 2013	1
23 November 2013	6	Loved Me Back to Life	Celine Dion	3	23 November 2013	1
23 November 2013	2	Salute	Little Mix	4	23 November 2013	1
23 November 2013	3	Direct Hits	The Killers	6	23 November 2013	1
23 November 2013	1	The Fabulous Rock 'n' Roll Songbook	Cliff Richard	7	23 November 2013	1
23 November 2013	1	Trust	Alfie Boe	8	23 November 2013	1
23 November 2013	1	The Best of Keane	Keane	10	23 November 2013	1
30 November 2013	9	Swings Both Ways (#4)	Robbie Williams	1	30 November 2013	4
30 November 2013	1	Shangri La	Jake Bugg	3	30 November 2013	1
30 November 2013	1	Goodbye – The Greatest Hits	JLS	6	30 November 2013	1
7 December 2013	6	Midnight Memories (#1)	One Direction	1	7 December 2013	2
7 December 2013	13	Since I Saw You Last (#9)	Gary Barlow	2	7 December 2013	4
7 December 2013	1	BZ20	Boyzone	6	7 December 2013	1
7 December 2013	1	Home for Christmas	Susan Boyle	9	7 December 2013	1
14 December 2013	1	A Musical Affair	Il Divo	5	14 December 2013	1
14 December 2013	1	Freedom	Rebecca Ferguson	6	14 December 2013	1
21 December 2013	13	Beyoncé ♦	Beyoncé	2	18 January 2014	1

== Entries by artist ==
The following table shows artists who achieved two or more top 10 entries in 2013, including albums that reached their peak in 2012. The figures only include main artists, with featured artists and appearances on compilation albums not counted individually for each artist. The total number of weeks an artist spent in the top ten in 2013 is also shown.

Entries	Artist	Weeks	Albums
2	Andrea Bocelli	4	Love in Portofino, Passione
2	Jake Bugg	15	Jake Bugg, Shangri La
2	Justin Timberlake	9	The 20/20 Experience, The 20/20 Experience – 2 of 2
2	Michael Bublé	20	Christmas, To Be Loved
2	One Direction	8	Midnight Memories, Take Me Home
2	Robbie Williams	6	Swings Both Ways, Take the Crown

== Notes ==
- 18 Months re-entered the top 10 at number 7 on 5 January 2013 (week ending) for 7 weeks, at number 8 on 4 May 2013 (week ending) for 2 weeks, at number 8 on 27 July 2013 (week ending) and at number 8 on 24 August 2013 (week ending) for 2 weeks.
- Ora re-entered the top 10 at number 8 on 5 January 2013 (week ending) for 2 weeks.
- Our Version of Events re-entered the top 10 at number 10 on 8 June 2013 (week ending).
- Right Place Right Time re-entered the top 10 at number 7 on 16 March 2013 (week ending), at number 9 on 15 June 2013 (week ending), at number 8 on 29 June 2013 (week ending) for 3 weeks and at number 4 on 7 December 2013 (week ending) for 5 weeks.
- Unapologetic re-entered the top 10 at number 10 on 13 April 2013 (week ending).
- Christmas (Michael Buble) originally peaked at number-one upon its initial release in 2011. It returned to the top 10 at the end of 2012 around Christmas. It re-entered the top 10 at number 10 on 14 December 2013 (week ending) for 4 weeks.
- Unorthodox Jukebox re-entered the top 10 at number 7 on 23 February 2013 (week ending) for 12 weeks, at number 7 on 8 June 2013 (week ending) and at number 9 on 6 July 2013 (week ending) for 4 weeks.
- Take Me Home re-entered the top 10 at number 8 on 2 February 2013 (week ending).
- Nothing but the Beat originally peaked at number 2 on its initial release in 2011.
- + re-entered the top 10 at number 3 on 12 January 2013 (week ending) for 4 weeks.
- Jake Bugg re-entered the top 10 at number 4 on 13 January 2013 (week ending) for 9 weeks and at number 5 on 6 July 2013 (week ending) for 5 weeks.
- Les Misérables: Highlights from the Motion Picture Soundtrack re-entered the top 10 at number 10 on 25 May 2013 (week ending).
- The Lumineers re-entered the top 10 at number 8 on 6 April 2013 (week ending).
- Fall to Grace re-entered the top 10 at number 9 on 26 January 2013 (week ending) and at number 10 on 2 March 2013 (week ending).
- Some Nights re-entered the top 10 at number 10 on 12 January 2013 (week ending) and at number 9 on 2 February 2013 (week ending).
- Red re-entered the top 10 at number 8 on 19 January 2013 (week ending) and at number 7 on 2 March 2013 (week ending).
- Rumours originally peaked at number-one upon its initial release in 1977.
- Babel re-entered the top 10 at number 5 on 23 February 2013 (week ending) for 5 weeks and at number-one on 13 July 2013 (week ending) for 4 weeks.
- Every Kingdom originally peaked at number 7 upon release in 2011, re-peaking at number 6 in 2012. It re-entered the top 10 at number 4 on 2 March 2013 (week ending) for 2 weeks, reaching a new peak.
- Bad Blood re-entered the top 10 at number 10 on 18 May 2013 (week ending), at number 6 on 8 June 2013 (week ending) for 2 weeks, at number 9 on 7 September 2013 (week ending), at number 9 on 21 September 2013 (week ending), at number 6 on 11 January 2014 (week ending) for 5 weeks and at number 10 on 22 February 2014 (week ending) for 5 weeks.
- Graffiti on the Train re-entered the top 10 at number 5 on 31 August 2013 (week ending) for 2 weeks.
- The Truth About Love re-entered the top 10 at number 10 on 16 March 2013 (week ending) for 10 weeks.
- Night Visions re-entered the top 10 at number 10 on 10 August 2013 (week ending) for 4 weeks and at number 9 on 15 March 2014 (week ending).
- To Be Loved re-entered the top 10 at number 4 on 6 July 2013 (week ending) for 9 weeks and at number 6 on 21 December 2013 (week ending) for 3 weeks.
- Home re-entered the top 10 at number 9 on 13 July 2013 (week ending) for 2 weeks, at number 9 on 3 August 2013 (week ending) for 6 weeks, at number 7 on 11 January 2014 (week ending) for 3 weeks and at number 5 on 1 March 2014 (week ending) for 2 weeks.
- All the Little Lights re-entered the top 10 at number 9 on 14 September 2013 (week ending) for 2 weeks and at number 9 on 26 October 2013 (week ending) for 2 weeks.
- The Shocking Miss Emerald re-entered the top 10 at number 10 on 15 June 2013 (week ending).
- Time re-entered the top 10 at number 6 on 21 September 2013 (week ending) for 3 weeks.
- A re-entered the top 10 at number 6 on 22 June 2013 (week ending).
- Random Access Memories re-entered the top 10 at number 10 on 20 July 2013 (week ending).
- Halcyon re-entered the top 10 at number 10 on 9 February 2013 (week ending), at number 9 on 8 June 2013 (week ending), at number 3 on 7 September 2013 (week ending) for 2 weeks, at number 6 on 28 December 2013 (week ending) for 13 weeks, at number 10 on 26 July 2014 (week ending) for 2 weeks and at number 7 on 16 August 2014 (week ending).
- Settle re-entered the top 10 at number 3 on 1 March 2014 (week ending) for 3 weeks.
- The Complete Greatest Hits originally peaked outside the top 10 at number 27 upon its initial release in 2003. It reached the top 10 for the first time in 2006, peaking number 9 and made number 9 again in 2013.
- In a Perfect World re-entered the top 10 at number 10 on 24 August 2013 (week ending) for 2 weeks.
- Long Way Down re-entered the top 10 at number 10 on 21 September 2013 (week ending).
- AM re-entered the top 10 at number 8 on 11 January 2014 (week ending) for 2 weeks, at number 2 on 1 March 2014 (week ending) for 4 weeks and at number 8 on 31 May 2014 (week ending) for 2 weeks.
- If You Wait re-entered the top 10 at number 9 on 2 November 2013 (week ending) for 2 weeks, at number 10 on 18 January 2014 (week ending) for 2 weeks, at number 7 on 8 February 2014 (week ending) for 8 weeks, at number 9 on 19 April 2014 (week ending) and at number 10 on 7 June 2014 (week ending).
- True re-entered the top 10 at number 9 on 11 January 2014 (week ending) for 7 weeks and at number 4 on 15 March 2014 (week ending).
- Tribute re-entered the top 10 at number 5 on 11 January 2014 (week ending) for 3 weeks and at number 10 on 1 March 2014 (week ending).
- Prism re-entered the top 10 at number 7 on 15 March 2014 (week ending).
- Moon Landing re-entered the top 10 at number 8 on 1 February 2014 (week ending) and at number 6 on 22 February 2014 (week ending).
- Pure Heroine re-entered the top 10 at number 8 on 8 February 2014 (week ending) for 2 weeks, at number 9 on 1 March 2014 (week ending) for 2 weeks and at number 8 on 22 February 2014 (week ending).
- The Marshall Mathers LP 2 re-entered the top 10 at number 7 on 4 January 2014 (week ending) and at number 10 on 8 February 2014 (week ending).
- Music of the Night re-entered the top 10 at number 7 on 30 November 2013 (week ending) for 2 weeks.
- Direct Hits re-entered the top 10 at number 10 on 28 December 2013 (week ending) for 2 weeks.
- Since I Saw You Last re-entered the top 10 at number 9 on 22 February 2014 (week ending), at number 10 on 5 April 2014 (week ending) and at number 2 on 17 May 2014 (week ending) for 2 weeks.
- Figure includes album that peaked in 2012.

== See also ==
- 2013 in British music
- List of number-one albums from the 2000s (UK)
