= Bo Bruce discography =

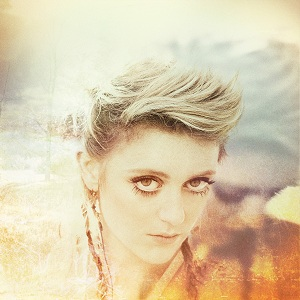
- Studio albums: 1
- EPs: 1
- Singles: 1
- Music videos: 3

The discography of English singer-songwriter Bo Bruce consists of one studio album and one extended play.

Bruce's debut release, an EP entitled Search The Night, which was produced by Tom Marsh was released as a download on 12 December 2010 on Bruce's own label, Helamonster. The EP peaked at number two on the iTunes album charts on 4 June 2012, following Bruce's success on The Voice UK.

On 1 February 2013, it was announced that Bruce's debut single would be titled "Save Me", and the album was confirmed to be titled Before I Sleep. Both the single and the album were released on 29 April 2013, with the album charting within the top 10 on the UK Albums Chart, at number 10 and peaking at number 6 in the midweek charts. The second single "Alive" was released on 24 June 2013.

== Albums ==
=== Studio albums ===
Title	Album details	Peak chart positions	
Title	Album details	UK	IRE
Before I Sleep	Released: 29 April 2013; Label: Mercury Records; Formats: CD, digital download	10	69

=== Extended plays ===
Title	Album details	Track listing
Search the Night	Released: 12 December 2010; Label: Helamonster; Peak Chart Position: no.18 (on 4 June 2012); Formats: CD, digital download	1. "Behind the Gates" – 3:40; 2. "Waking" – 4:32; 3. "Fighting Arizona" – 4:27; 4. "Crossfire" – 3:32; 5. "Black Ice" – 4:23

== Singles ==
=== As lead artist ===
==== as herself ====
Title	Year	Peak chart positions	Album
Title	Year	UK	Album
"Save Me"	2013	53	Before I Sleep
"Alive"	2013	98	Before I Sleep
"The Hands I Hold"	2013	–	Before I Sleep

==== as Equador ====
Title	Year	Album			
Title	Year	Album	"Blood"	2015	Non-album Single
"Break Me Gently"	2016				Non-album Single
"Bones of Man"	2016				Non-album Single

=== As featured artist ===
Title	Year	Album
"Come To Me" (Simon Patterson & Greg Downey Feat. Bo Bruce)	2011	Non-album single
"Still Here" (Mike Shiver Feat. Bo Bruce)	2012	Non-album single
"Damaged" (Kryder featuring Bo Bruce)	2012	Non-album single
"U" (Gareth Emery feat. Bo Bruce)	2014	Drive
"Still with Me" (Chicane feat. Bo Bruce)	2015	The Sum of Its Parts
"Coming Home" (Dash Berlin feat. Bo Bruce)	2017	We Are, Part. 2
"Covered in Gold" (Paul van Dyk feat. Bo Bruce)	2020	Guiding Light

== Other charted songs ==
Year	Title	Peak chart positions	Album
Year	Title	UK	Album
2012	"Running Up that Hill"	69	The Voice UK, The Final 8 – The Album

== Guest appearances ==
Song	Year	Album
"Nothing Compares 2 U"	2012	The Voice UK, The Final 8 – The Album
"Running Up that Hill"	2012	The Voice UK, The Final 8 – The Album

== Music videos ==
=== As lead artist ===
List of music videos, showing year released and director
Title	Year	Director(s)
"The Fall"	2012	James Lawes
"Save Me"	2013	Maximilla Lukacs
"Alive"	2013	James Lawes
