= Spitting Image (album) =

Studio album by The Strypes
- Released: 16 June 2017
- Recorded: November 2016
- Studio: Rockfield Studios, Wales
- Genre: Rock, pop
- Length: 48:22
- Label: Virgin EMI
- Producer: Ethan Johns

The Strypes chronology
Little Victories (2015)	Spitting Image (2017)	Almost True E.P (2017)

Spitting Image is the third and final studio album by Irish rock band The Strypes, released on 16 June 2017.

The folIow-up to the band's lukewarmly received second album, 2015's Little Victories, Spitting Image was recorded In Rockfield Studios in Wales and produced by Ethan Johns throughout November 2016. The album was released on the Virgin EMI label. It was preceded by the Spitting Image Demos E.P and the Almost True E.P (both 2017). The band embarked on a world tour in support of the album. Despite this, the album became the band's least successful, failing to reach the top 3 of the Irish charts and failing to chart at all in the U.K, France or the Netherlands. Seven months following the conclusion of the tour on 14 November 2018, the band announced their break-up on Instagram, making Spitting Image their last album as an active band.

== Background and production ==
The band began writing the follow-up to their 2015 sophomore album Little Victories at the beginning of 2016. The band had recently finished their tour in support of Little Victories and were spending time at home. While off the road, the band members wrote music which they planned to turn to songs for their then unannounced third album. During the summer, the band went to the U.K, where they recorded acoustic demos of some of the songs. While in the studio, the band met producer Ethan Johns whom they were big fans of. The band toured some small venues around Ireland in order to road test material for the album before they began the main recording sessions. These concerts were documented on the "Never Mind the Mocks" youtube series. The band reunited with Johns to produce the album and recorded it throughout November 2016 in Rockfield studios, Wales. It was the first time the band recorded an album in one go, rather than having to record in different studios or in sporadic sessions due to their touring commitments.

The band cited Elvis Costello, Nick Lowe and Squeeze as heavy influences on the album. Drummer Evan Walsh cited the New York Dolls and Johnny Thunder as influences for "Garden of Eden". Guitarist Josh McClorey cited Nirvana as an influence on "Heavenly Soul" from the subsequent Almost True e.p

== Release ==
On 25 April 2017, the band released "Oh Cruel World" as the first single from the album, which was announced and named alongside the video. They followed it up with "Behind Closed Doors" on 15 May.

The album was released on 16 June 2017 alongside the single "Great Expectations".

The bands first major live performances following the release of the album were in support of the Killers and Elbow at Hyde Park, London during the 2017 BST festival in July. On 6 October, the band released the Spitting Image Demos E.P which contained acoustic versions of five of the album's tracks. Shortly before embarking on their U.K tour, they released the Almost True EP, composed of unreleased songs from the Spitting Image sessions.

=== Tour ===
The band embarked on a headline world tour on 4 November in support of the album, which saw the band travel across Ireland, the U.K, the United States, Japan, the Netherlands, Germany, Belgium, France and Spain The band also supported Paul Weller and Liam Gallagher on their respective headline tours on occasion. The band were forced to prematurely cancel their remaining U.S shows in early April 2018 after drummer Evan Walsh was ruled unfit to perform.

Bassist Pete O' Hanlon, wanting to create a tour video-diary that wasn't "absolutely shite" created the "Surprisingly Dull Adventures" series. The series ran for 62 episodes, with the episodes typically being only a few minutes long, documenting the band's live performances and life on the road during the Spitting Image tour.

=== Fall-out ===
The band announced their break-up on Instagram on 14 November 2018, seven months following the cancellation of the tour, making Spitting Image the band's last studio album to be released during the band's lifetime.

== Critical reception ==
Professional ratings
Review scores
Source	Rating
The Irish Times	4/5 stars
University Express	(Positive)
Indie Buddy	(Highly positive)
The Last Mixed Tape	7/10
Chirp Radio	(Highly positive)

Spitting Image received mostly positive reviews in comparison to their previous album Little Victories with many reviewers remarking on their musical maturity. Tony Clayton-Lea of The Irish Times gave the album 4/5 stars, stating that the band had matured nicely from their "teenage r&b habit" and "developed into a band full of the joys of adulthood". J.J Lee of University Express said that the band maintained their "vintage feel" on the album but stated that the album is also "an organic musical coming of age, and in spectacular fashion." Indie Buddy said that the band "have created an album rich with great tunes." and noting that "they really have grown immensely, creating an album that is a treasure trove of opulent sounds". Stephen White of the Last Mixed Tape rated the album 7/10, saying that it was "Solid" if "not a little unremarkable", noting their songwriting skill but being disappointed that they have released another "throwback" record, saying that it "leaves them sounding like just another by-the-numbers rock ‘n’ roll band (which they aren’t)".

== Track listing ==
=== Spitting Image ===
All tracks are written by Ross Farrelly, Josh McClorey, Pete O' Hanlon & Evan Walsh, except where noted. All tracks produced by Ethan Johns.

No.	Title	Lyrics	Length
1.	"Behind Closed Doors"		3:49
2.	"Consequence"		2:53
3.	"(I Need a Break From) Holidays"		3:12
4.	"Grin And Bear It"		3:14
5.	"Easy Riding"		4:06
6.	"Great Expectations"		5:05
7.	"Garden of Eden"		5:12
8.	"A Different Kind of Tension"		2:47
9.	"Get It Over Quickly"		2:53
10.	"Turnin' My Back"		3:02
11.	"Black Shades Over Red Eyes"		4:09
12.	"Mama Give Me Order"	Josh McClorey	2:53
13.	"Oh Cruel World"		5:07
Total length:			48:23

=== Spitting Image Demos E.P ===
All tracks are written by Ross Farrelly, Josh McClorey, Evan Walsh and Pete O' Hanlon. All tracks produced by The Strypes.

No.	Title	Length
1.	"Behind Closed Doors - Acoustic"	4:48
2.	"Great Expectations - Acoustic"	4:40
3.	"A Different Kind of Tension - Acoustic"	2:51
4.	"Grin And Bear It - Acoustic"	3:19
5.	"(I Need A Break From) Holidays - Acoustic"	3:07
Total length:		18:48

=== Almost True E.P ===
All tracks are written by Ross Farrelly, Josh McClorey, Pete O' Hanlon and Evan Walsh, except where noted. All tracks produced by The Strypes except where noted.

No.	Title	Lyrics	Length
1.	"How Could I Forget"		2:55
2.	"Heavenly Soul"		3:26
3.	"Freckle And Burn"		3:30
4.	"Summertime Blues - Live" (Produced by Damian Chennells)	Eddie Cochran, Jerry Capehart	3:10
Total length:			13:02

== Charts and commercial success ==
Spitting Image became the band's least commercially successful album, despite receiving more positive reviews than its predecessor. The album became their first and only not to reach the top 3 on the Irish Album charts (their debut, Snapshot and Little Victories reached #2 and #1 respectively), reaching #8. It was their first and only album to not reach the top 25 on the Japanese Album charts (Oricon), reaching #45 (Snapshot and Little Victories reached #13 and #22 respectively.) It was also their only album to fail to chart in the U.K France or the Netherlands.

Chart (2017)	Peak position
Irish Albums (IRMA)	8
Japanese Albums (Oricon)	45

== Personnel ==
=== The Strypes ===
- Ross Farrelly – Vocals
- Josh McClorey – Guitar, Vocals (12)
- Pete O' Hanlon – Bass
- Evan Walsh – Drums

=== Other personnel ===
- Ethan Johns – Producer, Mixer
- Dominik Monks – Recording engineer
- Bob Ludwig – Mastering engineer
