= The Last Mixed Tape =

Daily music blog

- Website type: Music blog, blog, Music criticism, Podcast
- Available in: English
- Owner: Stephen White (editor)
- Creator: Stephen White
- Website: thelastmixedtape.com
- Registration: None
- Launched: 12 February 2014
- Current status: Online

The Last Mixed Tape is an Irish-based weekly music podcast and YouTube series founded in February 2014 by critic and journalist Stephen White. The site is composed of reviews, interviews, and news features all written by White, specifically about the Dublin music scene. Although the site is listed as a blog, White has on several occasions distanced himself from the term, preferring to be called a "critic." In December 2023, The Last Mixed Tape changed format moving from daily music blog to a weekly podcast and YouTube series hosted by White.

The website promotes and critiques the artists coming out of Ireland's independent scene, spanning several genres including indie, electronic, post punk, noise pop and alternative rock.

== Writing style and criticism ==
White champions Irish indie and pop music, and overall writes about the Irish music scene in a thoughtful, considered and positive tone. He does not shy away from sharp critique and has previously made statements that some music fans considered to be controversial, for example about Irish act Kodaline in which he likened them to "vanilla ice-cream". White's reviews of The Coronas album Trust the Wire and The Strypes album Spitting Image were seen by some fans as unfair at the time.

== Awards and nominations ==
Since its first year the Last Mixed Tape was nominated for six music blogging awards, the Blog Awards Ireland in 2014, 2015, 2016 & 2018 and at the Web Awards Ireland in 2014, 2015 & 2016.

== Appearances and events ==
The Last Mixed Tape has also taken part in several events and charity shows around Dublin. White has appeared on several panel discussions representing the blog, including multiple appearances at Vinyl & Wine and an appearance at the State.ie of the Nation Address.

In May 2015, White appeared as part of a discussion panel at Life Festival, speaking about Nas and his debut album Illmatic. White also guested as a host on weekly radio show the Co-Present alongside Fight Like Apes singer MayKay.

In September 2014, White along with several promoters from the Dublin area ran a charity night for the Irish Red Cross to raise funds for their appeal to help victims of the 2014 Israel-Gaza conflict. The night was headlined by local rock 'n' roll band the Minutes. In May 2015, The Last Mixed Tape took part in an event at Whelan's to raise funds for the Yes Equality campaign during the Thirty-fourth Amendment of the Constitution (Marriage Equality) Bill 2015. This was followed by another charity gig in September 2015 in aid of Irish Red Cross Migration appeal during the European migrant crisis.

In 2019, White was announced as one of the judges for the Choice Music Prize Album of the Year 2018 and returned in 2023 to judge the Irish Artist of the Year award.

== Podcast ==
In 2015, the Last Mixed Tape began a weekly music review podcast. The show was originally uploaded every Friday morning and featured White reviewing Irish indie albums and singles. It was hosted by local Irish DJ Kate Brennan-Harding, a producer for the Irish national and independent radio station, Today FM. Sara Lovic took over as co-host from January 2018 to 2021.

In 2023, The Last Mixed Tape podcast returned in a new weekly format, hosted by White and released every Saturday.
