= Before I Sleep =

Before I Sleep may refer to:

- Before I Sleep (album), a 2013 album by Bo Bruce
- Before I Sleep (film), a 2013 drama film
- "Before I Sleep", the fifteenth episode of the first season of Stargate Atlantis
