= Attraction (group) =

Shadow theatre group

- Formation: 2004–present
- Type: Theatre group
- Purpose: Shadow theatre
- Location: Budapest, Hungary
- Members: Katalin Torda; Alexandra Tóth; Norbert Fehér; Andrea Lakatos; Zoltán Szűcs; Csaba Szentinek; Flóra; Szabados; Janka Kántor
- Website: attractionperformances.com

Attraction are a Hungarian shadow theatre group. They rose to fame during a performance at the Hungary Olympic Oath Ceremony for the London 2012 Olympics, in which they did a rendition of many of the traditional sports within the five rings of the Olympic games logo. Less than a year later, they won the seventh series of Britain's Got Talent on 8 June 2013, beating Jack Carroll.

== History ==
=== 2004: Formation guys ===
The group was founded in 2004 by Zoltán Szűcs. Szűcs himself was a performer who achieved national success in the mid-1990s with his pop group Hip Hop Boyz, when he was known as Real Action. Attraction itself consists of twelve members, although only eight were able to perform on Britain's Got Talent: Torda Katalin, Tóth Alexandra, Fehér Norbert, Lakatos Andrea, Szűcs Zoltán, Szentinek Csaba, Szabados Flóra and Kántor Janka.

=== Das Supertalent (2012) ===
In 2012, they finished in 7th place in the German version of the Got Talent franchise: Das Supertalent.The German judges found Attraction very creative, though they also said that Attraction could do more with their talent. Their black light performance did not have enough power to convince the Germans of letting them pass on to the finals. Judge Thomas Gottschalk said he had never seen anything quite like this and that he was stunned by their performance.

=== Britain's Got Talent (2013) ===
For their Britain's Got Talent auditions, they acted out a story of a couple who meet at Stonehenge, fall in love, marry, and have a child. The father goes off to war shortly after their baby is born, and dies tragically. The piece ends with an image of the mother and daughter standing beside his tombstone. Judge Amanda Holden fought back tears and called the performance 'moving' and they received a loud standing ovation from the audience and judges.

For their semi-final performance, Attraction depicted a mother giving birth to her son, the son going off to college, getting married, and eventually the mother dies in her son's arms. At the end, the son's wife reveals that she is pregnant. The story was based on Szűcs' life story, who dedicated the performance to his late mother. They got high praise from the judges, with Holden stating that she even saw Simon Cowell shed a tear. They got first place on the 5th semi-final vote sending them straight to the finals.

In the final Attraction performed a tribute to Britain, the highlights being when a lion was formed with their bodies and the face of Queen Elizabeth II they formed with their bodies at the end of the performance. Once again they received a standing ovation and again Holden shed a tear. They were announced the winners and became the first foreign act to win Britain's Got Talent and the third group act to win.

=== Post Talent ===
It has been reported that they will perform at The Mirage in Las Vegas. As winners of Britain's Got Talent, they performed at the Royal Variety Performance on 9 December 2013.

The group has also been invited to perform at the 2014 CCTV New Year's Gala on China Central Television, showing renditions of landmarks and icons of China, such as Huangshan, The Great Wall of China, The Temple of Heaven, the giant panda, and a Changzheng launch vehicle. The performance ends, in applause, with a configuration of the Chinese character for spring (春), followed by another configuration of the digits 2014 in the shape of a Horse, the Chinese zodiac for the lunar year 2014.

In 2014, Attraction appeared on Ant & Dec's Saturday Night Takeaway alongside fellow Britain's Got Talent winner Paul Potts. The group later also made a return appearance on Britain's Got Talent along with fellow 2013 contestants Richard & Adam. They also performed "Best of Britain’s Got Talent" on the show's 10th series.

In 2014 Attraction were chosen to front a major TV advertising Campaign for UK insurance broker Swinton Insurance.

In 2022, Attraction Juniors auditioned for the 2022 series of Britain's Got Talent. The junior group was put together by Szűcs, and is fronted by his son Marton.

On 21 December 2023, Attraction depicted the lives of Katherine Shoesmith and Rhys Cogan culminating in the engagement of the couple.

=== America's Got Talent: The Champions (2019) ===
In February 2019, Attraction competed in America's Got Talent: The Champions. They made it to the top 3 of their preliminary round, however, they came 2nd in the Superfan voting, so they did not advance to the finale.

== Members ==
- Katalin Torda
- Alexandra Tóth
- Norbert Fehér
- Andrea Lakatos
- Zoltán Szűcs
- Csaba Szentinek
- Flóra Szabados
- Janka Kántor

Preceded by Ashleigh and Pudsey	Winner of Britain's Got Talent; 2013	Succeeded by Collabro
