= The Christmas Album (Richard & Adam album) =

Studio album by Richard & Adam
- Released: 2 December 2013
- Recorded: 2013
- Genre: Christmas
- Length: 40:00
- Label: Sony
- Producer: Matt Furmidge, Graham Stack

Richard & Adam chronology
The Impossible Dream (2013)	The Christmas Album (2013)	At the Movies (2014)

The Christmas Album is the second studio album by Welsh operatic duo Richard & Adam, who first rose to fame on the seventh series of the ITV talent show Britain's Got Talent in 2013, on which they finished third. The album was released on 2 December 2013 through Sony Music as the second album of the two-album contract that they signed after the show. The album consists of cover of various Christmas songs, including "I Saw Three Ships", "Silent Night", "Once in Royal David's City".

== Track listing ==
Standard edition
No.	Title	Length
1.	"O Holy Night"	4:16
2.	"Hark! The Herald Angels Sing"	3:44
3.	"Away in a Manger"	3:41
4.	"Once in Royal David's City"	3:15
5.	"I Saw Three Ships Come Sailing In (On Christmas Day)"	3:15
6.	"In the Bleak Midwinter"	4:03
7.	"Silent Night"	3:35
8.	"Adeste Fideles (O Come, All Ye Faithful)"	3:34
9.	"The First Noël"	4:12
10.	"O Little Town of Bethlehem"	3:29

== Chart performance ==
=== Weekly charts ===
Chart (2013)	Peak position
Scottish Albums (OCC)	37
UK Albums (OCC)	24

=== Year-end charts ===
Chart (2013)	Position
UK Albums (OCC)	172

== Release history ==
Region	Date	Format	Label
United Kingdom	2 December 2013	CD, digital download	Sony
