= The Message (Andrea Begley album) =

Studio album by Andrea Begley
- Released: 21 October 2013
- Recorded: 2013
- Genre: Pop
- Length: 45:04
- Label: Capitol Records

Singles from The Message
- 1. "My Immortal" Released: June 2013; 2. "Dancing in the Dark" Released: October 2013

The Message is the debut studio album by British singer Andrea Begley. The album was released in the United Kingdom on 21 October 2013 by Capitol Records. The album has peaked to number 7 on the UK Albums Chart and number 61 on the Irish Albums Chart.

== Singles ==
- "My Immortal" was released as the lead single from the album in June 2013. The single has peaked to number 30 on the UK Singles Chart and number 70 on the Irish Singles Chart.
- "Dancing in the Dark" was released as the second single from the album in October 2013.

== Track listing ==
| No. | Title | Length |
|---|---|---|
| 1. | "Ho Hey" | 2:32 |
| 2. | "Dancing in the Dark" | 3:44 |
| 3. | "Secret Smile" | 3:16 |
| 4. | "Breakfast At Tiffany's" | 3:30 |
| 5. | "The Message" | 4:05 |
| 6. | "Lightning Bolt" | 2:14 |
| 7. | "Angel" | 4:25 |
| 8. | "Latch" | 3:43 |
| 9. | "Autumn" | 3:21 |
| 10. | "Take On Me" | 3:40 |
| 11. | "Falling Slowly" | 3:39 |
| 12. | "Love Will Tear Us Apart" | 3:28 |
| 13. | "My Immortal" | 3:33 |

== Chart performance ==
| Chart (2013) | Peak position |
|---|---|
| Irish Albums (IRMA) | 61 |
| Scottish Albums (OCC) | 7 |
| UK Albums (OCC) | 7 |
| UK Album Downloads (OCC) | 12 |

== Release history ==
| Region | Date | Format | Label |
|---|---|---|---|
| United Kingdom | 21 October 2013 | Digital download, CD | Capitol Records |

== See also ==
- List of UK top-ten albums in 2013
