= Little Victories (Strypes album) =

Studio album by The Strypes
- Released: 2015
- Genres: Garage rock revival, indie rock
- Length: 43:25
- Label: Virgin EMI
- Producers: Charlie Russell, Bradley Spence

The Strypes chronology
Snapshot (2013)	Little Victories (2015)	Spitting Image (2017)

Little Victories is the second studio album by Irish rock band the Strypes, released on 15 July 2015 by Virgin EMI Records. A Deluxe edition was released on 22 July 2015.

The band's sophomore album (the follow-up to their 2013 debut album Snapshot), Little Victories was recorded at Dean Street Studios in Soho, London, England from September 2014-January 2015. The band worked with former Robbie Williams producer Charlie Russell and former Kasabian producer Bradley Spence on the album. It successfully topped the Irish album charts (beating their debut, which peaked at #2), but fared slightly worse internationally. The band launched a world tour in late 2015 in support of the album, releasing the live album Live in Tokyo 2015 that November.

The album received mixed reviews from critics, praising the instrumentals, but criticising their similarities to other artists and their lyrical content.

== Background and recording ==
The album was the follow-up to their debut L.P, Snapshot, released in September 2013.

Guitarist Josh McClorey stated that the origins of the songs featured on the album came from writing songs in vans or planes where he was unable to access instruments while on tour. He said that the lyrics were initially put to acoustic guitar or sung to drum loops before the band would "jam them out". McClorey stated that he wrote about "whatever he was going through" with the majority of the lyrics being based around "normal 19-year-old things" such as friendships and relationships as well as his experiences as a member of a band and being on tour. "Get Into It" was the first song recorded for the album, being recorded with Logic in the band's home studio in May 2014.

The band got into contact with producers Charlie Russell and Bradley Spence via their tour manager, who shared an office space. They were willing to go into the studio with the band to do a free studio session with them, to which the band accepted. The session was a success and the band hired the producers to work with them on their sophomore album full-time.

The band recorded the album in a similar fashion to their debut, where they would enter the studio for around a week before spending about 2 weeks at home or playing gigs. The band recorded the songs mainly from September–November 2014, finishing the sessions off fully in January the next year.

The name "Little Victories" came about after the band's manager Niall Walsh (drummer Evan Walsh's father) heard it on the radio. The band chose it because they all liked it and felt it wasn't pretentious, almost "self-deprecating" even.

The album cover was taken from an old picture taken in Cavan Town, County Cavan, where the band was based. It depicts a young boy winning a prize for his dog, which the band found to be amusing. It was adapted into cover art by Universal.

Bassist Pete O' Hanlon credits the producers with "pushing [the band] out of [their] comfort zone" and working on arrangements rather than just recording the album "as loud and [as] fast as [they] could". Josh McClorey notes that they were introduced to click tracks and different methods of recording by the producers. Drummer Evan Walsh said that he would often be the last person to fully record his parts on songs such as "Scumbag City", with the rest of the band recording their pieces first before he would record his drums, which was "unheard of" during their debut. McClorey stated that they experimented with pace during the recording sessions, performing a number of slower songs for the album, rather than playing everything "super fast and super exciting "".

== Release ==
"Scumbag City" was the first single released from the album, on 30 April 2015. "Eighty-Four" was the 2nd single, released on 15 May. "Get Into It" was released on 1 June. "A Good Night's Sleep & A Cab Fare Home" was the final pre-release single, released on 8 July. The album was released on 15 July, with the band appearing at its launch at Multisound in Cavan Town.

=== Tour ===
The band embarked on a world tour in support of the album later that year. The band travelled to Japan, where they recorded their first and only live album: Live in Tokyo 2015 which was released that November. The band would appear at numerous festivals the following year, supporting Johnny Marr at the Cultura Inglesa Festival in Brazil. and appearing at the Haldern Pop festival, Germany, Rock Werchter in Belgium and Personal Fest, Argentina.

== Critical reception ==
Professional ratings
Aggregate scores
Source	Rating
Metacritic	61/100
Review scores
Source	Rating
NME	2/5 stars
The Guardian	2/5
Bearded Gentlemen Music	4/5
Q Magazine	80/100

The album received mixed reviews, with many reviewers praising the instrumentals of the album, but finding fault in its songwriting or in its similarity to other artists. Tim Jonze of the Guardian rated the album 2 out of 5 stars. In his review, Jonze said The Strypes had only advanced to 2005 in quality. Metacritic scored the album with a 61/100, based on 7 critical reviews. Q Magazine ranked the album positively with an 80. In their review, the writers at Q said, "It's their broadening of the musical palette which is more impressive." NME also gave the album 2 out of 5 stars.

Lauren Murphy of the Irish Times rated the album 3/5 saying that the band succeeded in creating a more "grown-up-sounding record, packed with lip-smacking guitar licks, strong melodies and strident anthemic indie-rock choruses." but "struggled to find an original sound as evidenced by tracks such as Get Into It (Arctic Monkeys), Queen of the Half Crown (Oasis) and Everyday (The Beatles)".

Katie Fusillo of Bearded Gentlemen Music rated the album 4/5 and said that the band succeeded in pulling off the type of music you'd expect "any teenager who dropped out of school to pursue music: sex, drugs, and rock and roll".

In an extremely negative review, Artbox on Sputnik music gave them 1.5/5, stating that the band had "transitioned from standard, derivative blues stereotypes to standard, derivative millennial indie rock stereotypes". They criticised the lyrics and songwriting and similarities to other artists, however, they did resent that the band were "good with their instruments, and the rhythm section in particular has stepped up its game from Snapshot" however, In conclusion, the reviewer recommended that it would be better to listen to "anyone else, really".

Polly Glass of Louder Sound rated them 3.5/5 stars, saying that lyrically the band were not "exactly poets ...though they’re not illiterate imbeciles either". Saying that the album took "a few listens to shine" but that the band were "up for the challenge [in regards to songwriting]" and that they had " comfortably upped their instrumental game".

== Track listing ==
All tracks are written by Ross Farrelly, Josh McClorey, Pete O' Hanlon and Evan Walsh. All tracks produced by Charley Russell and Bradley Spence.

No.	Title	Length
1.	"Get Into It"	2:59
2.	"I Need to Be Your Only"	3:46
3.	"A Good Night's Sleep and a Cab Fare Home"	2:56
4.	"Eighty-Four"	3:02
5.	"Queen of the Half Crown"	3:26
6.	"(I Wanna Be Your) Everyday"	5:33
7.	"Best Man"	3:11
8.	"Three Streets and a Village Green"	3:58
9.	"Now She's Gone"	3:08
10.	"Cruel Brunette"	3:53
11.	"Status Update"	3:48
12.	"Scumbag City"	3:52
Total length:		43;30

=== Deluxe edition ===
All tracks are written by Ross Farrelly, Josh McClorey, Pete O' Hanlon and Evan Walsh. All tracks produced by Charley Russell and Bradley Spence.

No.	Title	Length
1.	"Get Into It"	2:59
2.	"I Need to Be Your Only"	3:46
3.	"A Good Night's Sleep and a Cab Fare Home"	2:56
4.	"Eighty-Four"	3:02
5.	"Queen of the Half Crown"	3:26
6.	"(I Wanna Be Your) Everyday"	5:33
7.	"Best Man"	3:11
8.	"Three Streets and a Village Green"	3:58
9.	"Now She's Gone"	3:08
10.	"Cruel Brunette"	3:53
11.	"Status Update"	3:48
12.	"Scumbag City"	3:52
13.	"Fill the Space In"	3:10
14.	"Lovers Leave"	3:37
15.	"Rejection"	2:21
16.	"G.O.V."	3:34
Total length:		56:12

=== Live In Tokyo 2015 ===
All tracks are written by Ross Farrelly, Josh McClorey, Pete O' Hanlon & Evan Walsh.

No.	Title	Length
1.	"Now She's Gone -Live"	4:00
2.	"Best Man -Live"	3:01
3.	"Eighty-Four -Live"	2:45
4.	"What The People Don't See -Live"	2:27
5.	"A Good Night's Sleep and A Cab Fare Home -Live"	2:55
6.	"Get Into It- Live"	4:11
7.	"Mystery Man -Live"	2:21
8.	"Scumbag City -Live"	4:16
9.	"Blue Collar Jane -Live"	3:04
10.	"I Need To Be Your Only -Live"	5:24
Total length:		34:27

== Charts ==
The album became the band's first to reach #1 in their native Ireland, moving up one spot from their debut Snapshot, however, the album fared slightly worse internationally, falling from #45 (Snapshot) to #57 in the Netherlands, #13 to #22 in Japan and #5 to #17 in the UK. However, it did beat Snapshot by reaching #66 on the French album charts, compared to #75. It was the final Strypes album to chart in the UK, France or the Netherlands as its follow-up, 2017's Spitting Image failed in those countries.

Chart (2015)	Peak position
French Albums (SNEP)	66
Irish Albums (IRMA)	1
UK (OCC)	17
Japan (Oricon)	22
Dutch (MegaCharts)	57
Belgium Albums (Ultratop)	41
