= The Impossible Dream (Richard & Adam album) =

Studio album by Richard & Adam
- Released: 29 July 2013
- Recorded: July 2013
- Genre: Operatic pop, gospel
- Length: 39:45
- Label: Sony
- Producer: Graham Stack, Matt Furmidge

Richard & Adam chronology
The Impossible Dream (2013)	The Christmas Album (2013)

The Impossible Dream is the debut studio album by Welsh operatic duo Richard & Adam, who first rose to fame on the seventh series of the ITV talent show Britain's Got Talent, on which they finished third. The album was released on 29 July 2013 through Sony Music as the first of two albums that the duo released with their current contract.

== Background ==
On 2 July 2013, three weeks after finishing in third place on the seventh series of Britain's Got Talent, it was announced that Richard & Adam had signed a two-album deal with Sony Music and would be releasing their debut album on 29 July.

== Chart performance ==
On 4 August 2013, the album debuted at number one on the UK Albums Chart with sales of 29,000, knocking off previous chart topper Jahméne Douglas (Love Never Fails). It also topped the Scottish Albums Chart. On 22 August, it was announced that the album had gone gold, having shifted 100,000 copies. With four consecutive weeks atop the UK chart, the album became the longest-running number-one album of 2013 in the UK. As of December 2013, the album had sold 159,904 copies in the UK.

== Track listing ==
No.	Title	Original artist	Length
1.	"The Impossible Dream"	Richard Kiley	3:56
2.	"Bring Him Home"	Les Misérables	3:51
3.	"The Power of Love"	Frankie Goes to Hollywood	4:25
4.	"Hallelujah"	Leonard Cohen	3:23
5.	"Somewhere"	Reri Grist	3:23
6.	"Amazing Grace"	John Newton	4:31
7.	"Ave Maria"	Charles Gounod	4:48
8.	"Unchained Melody"	Todd Duncan	3:50
9.	"Caruso"	Lucio Dalla	3:57
10.	"The Winner Takes It All"	ABBA	3:41

== Charts and certifications ==
=== Weekly charts ===
Chart (2013)	Peak position
Scottish Albums (OCC)	1
UK Albums (OCC)	1
UK Album Downloads (OCC)	10

=== Year-end charts ===
Chart (2013)	Position
UK Albums (OCC)	50

=== Certifications ===
Region	Certification	Certified units/sales
United Kingdom (BPI)	Gold	100,000^{*}
^{*} Sales figures based on certification alone.
