= Andrea Begley =

- Born: 15 January 1987 (age 39); Pomeroy, Northern Ireland
- Genres: Pop rock, pop, Celtic, folk, country
- Occupations: Singer, songwriter
- Years active: 2012–present
- Labels: Capitol
- Website: https://andreabegley.com

Andrea Begley is a singer-songwriter from Pomeroy, Northern Ireland. She won the second series of the BBC singing competition show The Voice UK.

She is the niece of Irish country music singer Philomena Begley.

== Music career ==
Having grown up performing in all-Ireland fleadhanna (Irish dance and music festivals) and singing competitions, Begley began songwriting and performing in open mic and other events in Belfast following completion of a law degree, in 2008.

=== 2012: RTÉ's The Hit ===
In 2012, she took part in the pilot episode of RTE 2 song-writing competition show, The Hit, with her original composition The Message being selected by producer Steve Lillywhite for the final eight.

=== 2013: The Voice UK ===
Andrea Begley auditioned for The Voice UK, with The Script's Danny O'Donoghue choosing her for his team. After being crowned the winner, she was signed to Capitol Records and moved to London to record her debut album. Her winning single, a cover of "My Immortal" by Evanescence, entered the UK Singles Chart at number 75 that week. The single then went on to peak to number 30 on UK Singles Chart and number 70 on the Irish Singles Chart. Her debut studio album The Message was released on 21 October 2013.

==== Performances ====
Performed	Song	Original Artist	Result
Blind Audition	"Angel"	Sarah McLachlan	Joined Team Danny
Battle Rounds	"People Help the People" (against Alice Barlow)	Birdy	Winner
Knockout rounds	"Songbird"	Fleetwood Mac	Winner
Week 1	"Ho Hey"	The Lumineers	Safe
Week 2	"One of Us"	Joan Osborne	Safe
Final	"My Immortal"	Evanescence	Winner
Final	"Hall of Fame"	The Script	Winner
Final	"Angel"	Sarah McLachlan	Winner

=== 2013: The Message ===
On 21 October 2013 Begley released her debut studio album The Message, which includes "My Immortal", her winning single from The Voice UK, and "Dancing in the Dark". On 23 October 2013 the album was at number 10 on The Official Chart Update. On 24 October 2013 the album entered the Irish Albums Chart at number 61. On 27 October 2013 the album entered the UK Albums Chart at number 7. Her cover of A-ha's "Take On Me" was uploaded to YouTube by Shane O'Connor, who combined it with animation by Ecole Supérieure des Métiers Artistiques students Camille Chaiz, Hugo Jean, Juliette Jourdan, Marie Pillier, and Kevin Roger to create a spoof version of a John Lewis ad.

=== 2014—present ===
In 2014, Begley moved back to Ireland and has continued to tour, including two Irish tours with aunt Philomena Begley, in 2018 and 2019. She has released a number of singles independently, with her second studio album, "Soul of a Songbird", being released on 6 December 2019.

== Visual impairment and activism ==
Begley is partially sighted as a result of glaucoma, which she developed at the age of 5 following a diagnosis of juvenile arthritis at age 3 and a half. Since then she has had around 23 operations, leaving her with about 10 per cent vision. From the age of 19, she has volunteered with the Royal National Institute of Blind people, and is currently chair of the RNIB network committee in Northern Ireland. She is a motivational speaker, delivering talks on her own experiences of sight loss and issues around visual impairment and disability to organisations and businesses across the UK and Ireland.

== Controversy ==
The victory of Begley in The Voice raised the ire of competing coach will.i.am, who reportedly stormed off the set at the time her victory was announced. Begley expressed understanding at his disappointment, saying "Will spoke to me and he wishes me well, but obviously everybody wants their act to win. But at the end of the day, the audience voted me, so that's it."

In response to online criticism focused on Andrea's disability, members of the public and spokespersons for disability charities spoke out in support of Begley. Rosaleen Dempsey, children and youth services manager for the Royal National Institute of Blind People (RNIB) Northern Ireland, of which Begley is a committee member, told the Belfast Telegraph: "We've all seen the disparaging remarks about Andrea's sensational win on Saturday night, but the fact remains, she received the most votes because the majority of voters loved her voice. RNIB NI would like to congratulate Andrea and we're confident that with her fabulous voice and tenacious personality, she will go far."

A spokeswoman for Disability Action said, "Andrea has demonstrated her huge talent over the past number of weeks and we wish her every success in the future. Anyone commenting negatively in relation to Andrea's disability should think about the very positive attitude that Andrea has and deal with their own prejudices."

== Discography ==
=== Albums ===
Title	Album details	Peak chart positions		
Title	Album details	UK	IRE	SCO
The Message	Released: 21 October 2013; Labels: Universal Music; Formats: Digital download, CD	7	61	7
Soul of a Songbird	Released: 6 December 2019; Formats: Digital download, CD	–	–	–

=== Singles ===
Year	Title	Peak chart positions			Album
Year	Title	UK	IRE	SCO	Album
2021	"All I Want"	–	–	–	n/a
2021	"Dancing in the Sky"	–	–	–	n/a
2020	"Away in a Manger"	–	–	–	n/a
2020	"O Holy Night"	–	–	–	n/a
2020	"One More For The Road"	–	–	–	n/a
2019	"Shallow" (with Hype)	–	–	–	n/a
2019	"Always Remember Us This Way" (with Hype)	–	–	–	n/a
2019	"Beyond the Rainbow's End"	–	–	–	n/a
2017	"Never a Pal Like Mother"	–	–	–	n/a
2014	"In the Bleak Midwinter"	–	–	–	n/a
2013	"My Immortal"	30	70	36	The Message
2013	"Dancing in the Dark"	113	—	—	The Message
"—" denotes release that did not chart or was not released.

=== EPs ===
Year	Title	Peak chart positions		EP
Year	Title	UK	IRE	EP
2012	"The January Song"	–	–	From the Blue
2012	"The Message"	–	–	From the Blue
2012	"Talent in my Fingers"	–	–	From the Blue
"—" denotes release that did not chart or was not released.

=== Other charted songs ===
Year	Title	Peak chart positions	Album
Year	Title	UK	Album
2013	"Ho Hey"	98	The Message
2013	"Take On Me"	103	The Message
"—" denotes release that did not chart or was not released.

== Autobiography ==
Begley's autobiography, "I Didn't See That Coming", was published by BBC Books in October 2013. Of the title, Begley said, "I was conscious with the book I wanted to give it a tongue-in-cheek title ... For me, I think the most important thing is making people comfortable with [my visual impairment], and I think the more comfortable I am with it and the more I can sort of, you know, make a bit of a joke and have a bit of a laugh with it I think makes other people comfortable with it."
