= The Strypes =

Irish rock band

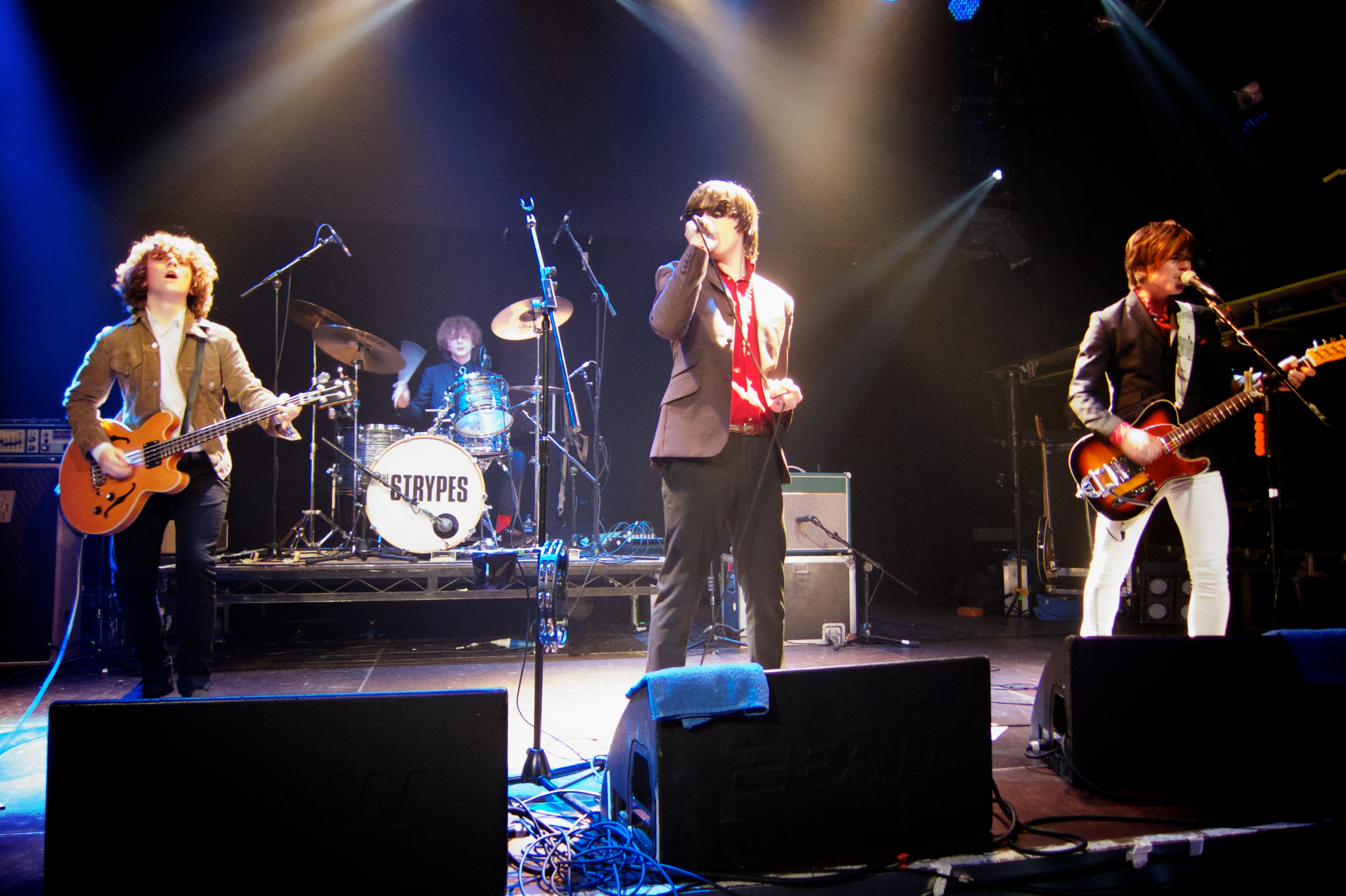
- The Strypes performing at the O2 Academy in 2013; Left to right: Pete O'Hanlon, Evan Walsh, Ross Farrelly, Josh McClorey

Background information
- Origin: Cavan, Ireland
- Genres: Mod revival, pub rock, rock and roll, indie rock, blues rock, hard rock
- Years active: 2010–2018
- Label: Virgin EMI Records
- Members: Ross Farrelly (Vocals); Josh McClorey (Guitar); Pete O'Hanlon (Bass); Evan Walsh (Drums)
- Past members: Jack Hayden (Bass); Conor Bates (guitar)

The Strypes were a four-piece rock band from Cavan, Ireland, formed in 2010 consisting of Ross Farrelly (lead vocals/harmonica), Josh McClorey (lead guitar/vocals), Peter O'Hanlon (bass guitar/harmonica) and Evan Walsh (drums). The band played the local scene with various members switching parts as they searched for their sound. They drew inspiration from 1960s blues boom and 1970s pub rock bands such as Dr. Feelgood, Eddie and the Hot Rods, The Rolling Stones, The Yardbirds, Lew Lewis and Rockpile as well as the original bluesmen and rock 'n' roll artists such as Chuck Berry, Bo Diddley, Howlin' Wolf and Little Walter, among others.

The band, with a shared love of blues and rhythm and blues music, formed in the town of Cavan, Ireland. After several months gigging around their hometown, the band began playing clubs and pubs around Ireland, playing sets mixing original material with rhythm and blues covers. Their performances became well received by crowds across Ireland and their reputation as a live act grew.

The band's debut EP Young, Gifted & Blue brought them surprise success and recognition in 2012, topping the iTunes Blues charts. After signing with Elton John's record label, the band released their debut L.P Snapshot in 2013, bringing them to national fame.

The band became known for their live performances and supported artists like the Arctic Monkeys, Johnny Marr and Paul Weller on tour.

The band followed up with the release of Little Victories, which received comparatively mixed reviews due to its more indie-rock style. They embarked on a world tour in support of the album.

The band released Spitting Image in 2017, which enjoyed rave reviews but relatively poor commercial success.

The band announced their split on social media in November 2018. Three of the former members remain musically active: McClorey as lead singer of Soft Launch, O'Hanlon as touring bassist for Lord Friday the 13th and Walsh as bassist and bandleader for The Savage Hearts.

== Music career ==
=== Formation and early years ===
The band formed in the town of Cavan in Ireland with the original line-up consisting of McClorey (10 September 1995), Walsh (30 October 1996), O'Hanlon (20 February 1996) on vocals, Jack Hayden (19 December 1995) and Conor Bates (guitar). The band made their debut at a primary school Christmas concert and started playing around Cavan and the surrounding areas. In a matter of months, however, Bates had left the band. Ross Farrelly (3 September 1997) joined on vocals and harmonica.

In November 2010, the then unknown band debuted on that year's edition of The Late Late Toy Show, leading to the launch of their career. In 2011, Hayden left the band. O'Hanlon then switched to bass.

=== 2012–2015: Breakthrough and debut album ===
In April 2012, they released a self-produced EP of four blues covers entitled Young, Gifted & Blue. It was led by a version of the Bo Diddley song "You Can't Judge a Book by the Cover" and also featured material penned by Billy Boy Arnold, Slim Harpo and Eddie Holland. All of the group's members were still in school at the time and merely recorded the EP as a fun side project. The band did all the preparation and promotion themselves and the EP reached No. 1 on the iTunes Blues Chart the day after release (a position it later held for a further six weeks). This came as a huge surprise to the band, and "You Can't Judge a Book by the Cover" became a minor hit on Irish radio.

The release of the EP also attracted record company interest, and a battle ensued between several major labels for the band's signatures. During this time they began travelling to London, playing clubs and venues around the city. During this time they were signed to Rocket Music Management, owned by Sir Elton John, a fan of the band. In December 2012, the band chose to sign with Mercury Records. Since signing, the band has begun playing venues across the UK and have appeared in music magazines such as NME and Mojo, as well as several national newspapers. Jeff Beck, Alice Cooper, Paul Weller, Noel Gallagher, Dave Grohl, Roger Daltrey, and Miles Kane are all known fans of the band.

During a February 2013 TV appearance on Chelsea Lately guest hosted by Dave Grohl, Elton John said of The Strypes, "They have a knowledge of R&B and blues at 16 years of age that I have only amassed in my 65 years. They're just like a breath of fresh air."

On 28 March 2013 the band released its debut single on Mercury Records, an original track titled "Blue Collar Jane". The single was released on download sites and radio, featuring two digital B-sides, on 28 March with a special edition numbered gatefold vinyl released on Record Store Day (20 April). The reaction to the single has been uniformly positive, with the A-side peaking at No. 11 on the iTunes Alternative Charts. The Record Store Day gatefold double 7" vinyl release featured "Blue Collar Jane" plus B-sides on one 45 and a slightly altered reprint of Young, Gifted & Blue on the other.

During April 2013 the band featured live on the popular BBC2 television programme Later... with Jools Holland, along with other musical artists Suede, Laura Mvula and Cat Power. The band's second single, "Hometown Girls" (backed by live versions of T-Bone Walker's "Stormy Monday Blues" and the traditional "CC Rider" recorded at King Tut's, Glasgow) was released as a download in May 2013 and on vinyl on 8 July.

The band's third single, "What a Shame", was released on download on 26 July with a vinyl run to follow later in August.

On 27 June 2013 the band were announced to be supporting British indie-rock band Arctic Monkeys on their 2013 UK, Belgium, France, Germany and Italy Tour.

In July 2013 The Strypes supported British indie-rock band The Courteeners at Castlefield Bowl in Manchester, along with Miles Kane and Reverend and the Makers

The band's debut album, titled Snapshot, was released on 9 September 2013. It was produced by former Beatles and Sex Pistols producer Chris Thomas.

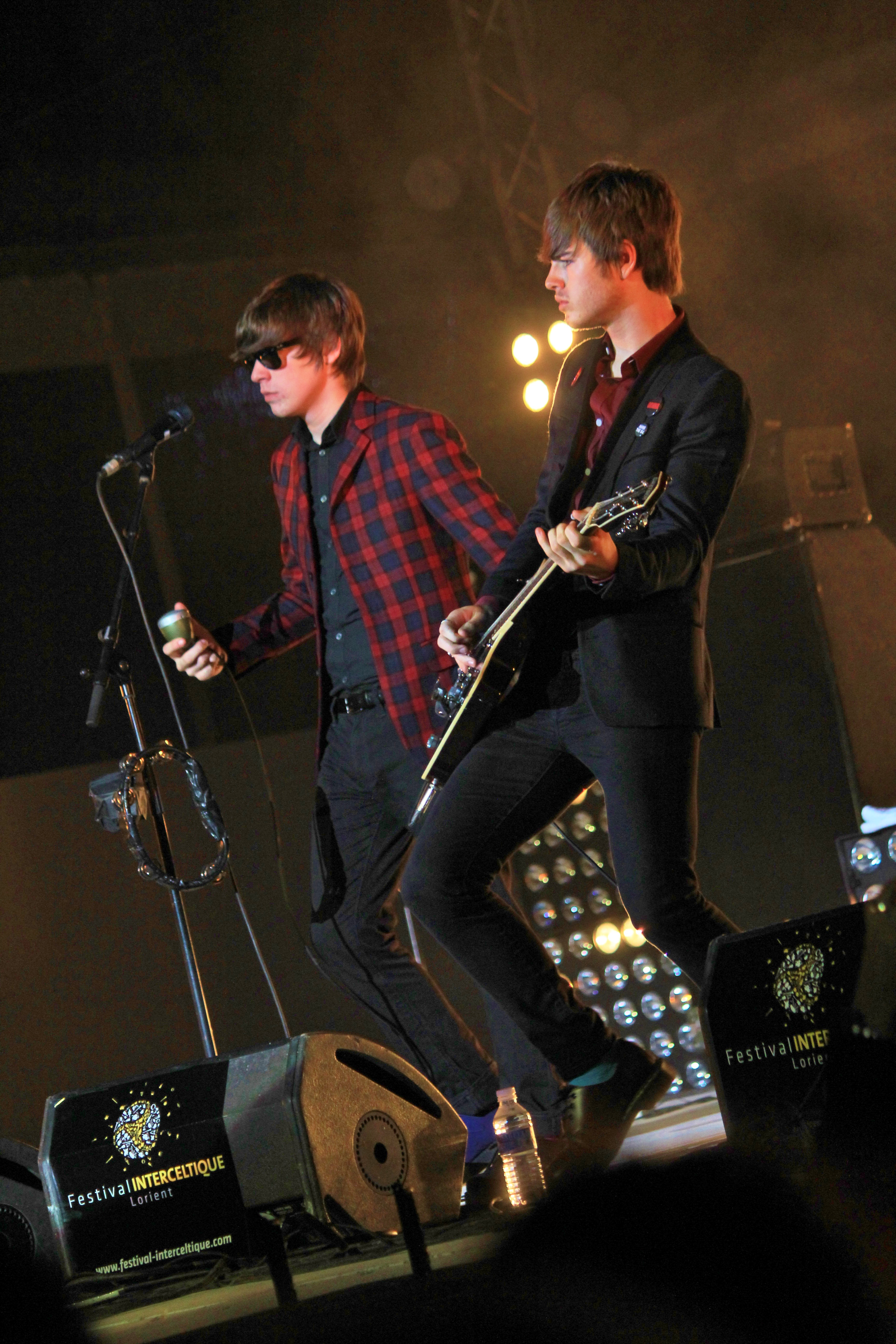
Concert during the Festival Interceltique de Lorient in 2014.

In March 2014 they appeared at SXSW backing BP Fallon performing the song Vicious at a Lou Reed memorial concert. The same year they were presented with The Grulke Prize for Developing Non-US Act.

26 March 2014 The Strypes played their biggest ever U.S. TV appearance, performing "What A Shame" on Late Show with David Letterman.

In July 2014 The Strypes toured Australia, playing single dates in Melbourne and Sydney.

Chris Difford of the hit band Squeeze - who is thanked on the liner notes of Snapshot - was an early mentor.

=== 2015-2017: Little Victories ===
In 2015, The Strypes released their second album, entitled Little Victories which reached number 1 on the Irish Charts and number 17 on the UK charts and embarked on a world tour to promote the album. In November 2015, the band released the album Live in Tokyo 2015, recorded from one of their live shows in Tokyo, Japan on the tour. They also played in Brazil, during the 'Cultura Inglesa Festival', opening for Johnny Marr.

In November 2016, the band announced a limited edition run of 500 vinyl only singles available exclusively from their website with all proceeds going to the teenage Cancer charity Canteen. It was released on the Reckless Records label The double-A-side features versions of Nick Lowe's "(What's So Funny 'Bout) Peace, Love, and Understanding" and Stefan Murphy's "Down at the Radiotron".

=== 2017-2018: Spitting Image ===
In March 2017, the band began touring smaller venues in Ireland to road test new material for a third studio album scheduled for release in June 2017. On 25 April 2017 it was announced that this album would be called Spitting Image. The album was released on 16 June of that year. Wanting to create a tour diary that was not "absolutely shite", Pete O'Hanlon created the "Surprisingly Dull Adventures of The Strypes" YouTube series which documented their subsequent tour in promotion of the album. In July 2017, the band supported main headliners, Nevada rock band The Killers, and Manchester band Elbow at a sold out Hyde Park, London for the BST 2017 festival. They also supported Paul Weller and Liam Gallagher on their respective headline tours.

=== 2018-present : Break-up and subsequent projects ===
On 14 November 2018, 7 months after cancelling the remainder of their Spitting Image tour due to drummer Evan Walsh being unfit to perform, the band announced their breakup through a post on their Instagram page. In an interview with Indie Buddy in 2020, Walsh stated that the band split-up because the members wanted to go in a different musical direction but were being pressured by their label to stick to a certain style.

Following the break-up of the Strypes, the band members continued their musical careers, with guitarist Josh McClorey releasing his first solo single "Everything Was Easy" in 2020 and singer Ross Farelly, bassist Pete O'Hanlon and drummer Evan Walsh forming the band the Zen Arcade, releasing their debut single "Don't Say A Word" in 2020. They have since disbanded.

As of April 2024, McClorey serves as lead singer and multi-instrumentalist for Indie band Soft Launch, O'Hanlon serves as touring bassist for Texas based glam-rock band Lord Friday the 13th and Walsh is the bassist and bandleader of Cavan based rock and roll outfit The Savage Hearts. They have released two 7" vinyl singles and a 12" EP with Galway's Blowtorch Records.

The Strypes appeared in the film Rocketman (2019), playing Elton John's backing band.

== Influences ==
The Strypes have cited Dr. Feelgood and the Yardbirds as their main musical influences, but members have also cited The Beatles, The Who, Chuck Berry, The Rolling Stones, Bo Diddley, The Jam, Willie Dixon, Little Richard, Elvis Costello, The Ramones, The New York Dolls, The Undertones, Squeeze, Rockpile, The Housemartins, Dave Edmunds, Royal Blood, Lew Lewis, Johnny Marr, The Animals, Johnny Thunder, Nine Below Zero, Thin Lizzy, Eddie Cochran, Jimmy Reed, Dave Evnans Little Walter, Howlin' Wolf,Them, The Fratellis,The Pirates, Blur, Elmore James, AC/DC, Nick Lowe, Muddy Waters, The Cars, Sonny Boy Williamson II, The Bohicas,John Mayall & The Bluesbreakers, Kaiser Chiefs, Jamie T, Slim Harpo, Robert Johnson, Billy Boy Arnold, Lead Belly, Kendrick Lamar, John Lee Hooker and Jerry Lee Lewis as influences. Guitarist Josh McClorey stated that "What A Shame" was influenced by the Arctic Monkeys and that "Heavenly Soul" was influenced by Nirvana

== Band members ==
- Ross Farrelly - lead vocals, harmonica (2010–2018)
- Josh McClorey - lead guitar, backing vocals (2010–2018)
- Peter O'Hanlon - bass (2010–2018)
- Evan Walsh - drums, percussion (2010–2018)

=== Former members ===
- Jack Hayden – bass (2010)

== Discography ==
=== Studio albums ===
Title	Album details	Peak chart positions				
Title	Album details	IRL	FRA	JPN	NLD	UK
Snapshot	Released: 9 September 2013 (UK); Label: Virgin EMI Records; Formats: CD, digital download, vinyl	2	75	13	45	5
Little Victories	Release: 21 August 2015 (UK); Label: Virgin EMI Records; Formats: CD, digital download, vinyl	1	—	22	57	17
Spitting Image	Release: 16 June 2017 (UK); Label: Virgin EMI Records; Formats: CD, digital download, vinyl	8	—	45	—	—
"—" denotes a title that did not chart.

=== EPs ===
Year	Title	Peak chart positions	Notes
Year	Title	iTunes Blues Chart	Notes
2012	Young Gifted & Blue	1	4-track home-recorded EP of covers that got the band noticed by record companies
2013	Blue Collar Jane EP	—	Two-disc gatefold limited vinyl edition for Record Store Day featuring "Blue Collar Jane" 45 as well as slightly altered reprint of "Young, Gifted & Blue"
2014	4 Track Mind EP	—	Four new tracks to coincide with the beginning of their UK Tour starting 11 February Later released under the name of "Hard To Say No EP" in Japan on 9 April.
2015	Flat Out EP	—	Three new tracks to coincide with the beginning of their UK Tour starting 30 April.
2017	Almost True	—	Three new tracks and one live track.
"—" denotes a title that did not chart.

=== Singles ===
Year	Title	B-Side(s)	Peak chart positions	Album
Year	Title	B-Side(s)	UK	Album
2013	"Blue Collar Jane"	"What the People Don't See", "I Wish You Would"	125	Snapshot
2013	"Hometown Girls"	"C. C. Rider (live)", "Stormy Monday Blues (live)"	140	Snapshot
2013	"What a Shame"	"Beautiful Delilah", "I Can Tell (live)"	—	Snapshot
2013	"Come Together"	—	—	Non-album single
2013	"Mystery Man"	—	—	Snapshot
2013	"You Can't Judge a Book by the Cover"	"You Keep Me Waiting", "Saved Me (From Myself)"	—	Snapshot
"—" denotes a title that did not chart.
