= Before I Sleep (album) =

Studio album by Bo Bruce
- Released: 29 April 2013
- Genre: Indie pop, trip hop
- Length: 57:33 (standard version) 69:04 (deluxe version)
- Label: Mercury
- Producer: Henry Binns; Jodi Milliner; James Flannigan; Anders Grahn; David Etherington; Karen Poole; Joel Pott; Matt Schwartz; Danny O'Donoghue; Al Rudd; Nick Southwood; Greg Kurstin; Johnny McDaid; Tom Marsh

Bo Bruce chronology
Search the Night (2010)	Before I Sleep (2013)

Singles from Before I Sleep
- 1. "Save Me" Released: 29 April 2013; 2. "Alive" Released: 24 June 2013; 3. "The Hands I Hold" Released: 26 August 2013

Before I Sleep is the debut studio album from British singer-songwriter Bo Bruce, released on 29 April 2013. The lead single from the album is titled Save Me, which was released on the same day as the album. The album peaked at number 6 in the Official Charts midweek UK Albums Chart on 1 May 2013 and charted at number 10 on the Official UK Top 40 Album Chart, on 5 May 2013.

== Background ==
Before I Sleep is the follow-up to Bruce's independently released 2010 extended play (EP), titled Search The Night, which peaked at number two on the iTunes chart in June 2012. The album also marks Bruce's first release on a major record label. Bo commented of the writing process "The process of making this album has been extraordinary. It's also been the hardest and most testing time of my life. But I’ve made an album I'm incredibly proud of and I can't wait for people to hear it."

The release features a number of collaborations, including Johnny McDaid of Snow Patrol, Sia, Greg Kurstin, Henry Binns of Zero 7, Joel Pott of Athlete and the second single co-written with former The Voice UK mentor Danny O'Donoghue, entitled 'Alive'. The album features several producers, including Tom Marsh, who worked on Bo's previous release Search The Night and James Flannigan.

It was announced that "Save Me" would be the first track from the album to be released as a single, which was released on the same day as the album. The track was written by Bruce, Shelly Poole and Matt Schwartz.

The second single from the album has been confirmed as "Alive", which is due for release in June 2013. The track was co-written by Bruce, Danny O'Donoghue and James Barry.

The artwork for the album was shot by photographer Eliot Lee Hazel, with Bruce describing his work as "gritty, cinematic and raw". Bruce also credits Hazel with helping to select the location for the video shoot for lead single "Save Me".

== Reception ==
Professional ratings
Review scores
Source	Rating
The Daily Mirror	3/5 stars
Entertainment Focus	3/5 stars
The Guardian	3/5 stars
New!	4/5 stars
The Times	3/5 stars
There Goes The Fear	7.5/10 stars
Virgin Media	3/5 stars

The release has also received largely positive reviews from critics, based on the album sampler and previews. Contact Music stated of the release, "we've already had a taste of what to expect with free download 'The Fall', with its breathtaking video. Album highlights include the stunning first single 'Save Me'; 'The Hands I Hold', a soaring, anthemic classic and the perky, panoramic 'Over & Over' - all driven by Bo's captivating voice."

On 26 April 2013 The Daily Mirror highlighted Before I Sleep as the "stand out album" of the week and awarded it a 3 star rating, with Gavin Martin commenting that the release was a "thoughtful, sensual work" and that Bruce's voice "has striking intimacy and character". Will Hodgkinson reviewed the album for The Times and gave a further of 3 out of 5 star rating, stating "you don't doubt the authenticity of feeling in Bruce's voice" and further commenting of Bruce's voice "shifting from quiver to whisper against tribal drums, keyboard melodies and backing choirs" on the release. The Guardian also gave the album a rating of 3 stars.

On 28 April 2013, the day before its release, The Daily Mirror featured Before I Sleep as the "must listen" release on that week's Hotlist. On 30 April 2013, New! gave the album a four star rating and voted it as "album of the week", stating that Before I Sleep was "an impressive, dramatic debut".

== Singles ==
"Save Me" is the lead single from the album and was released on 29 April 2013, the same day as the album. The release was written by Bruce, Shelly Poole and Matt Schwartz who also produced the track. "Save Me" received its first radio play on 20 March 2013 on BBC Radio 2, with a music video for the single being released the week before.

"Alive" is the second single from Before I Sleep and was released on 24 June 2013. The track was co-written by Bruce and Danny O'Donoghue of The Script

== Music videos ==
- "The Fall" - The music video for 'The Fall' was released on 27 November 2012. The video marked Bo's first release since competing in The Voice UK and Bruce announced that the track could be downloaded for free as an 'end of year gift' to the fans. The video was directed by James Lawes, a school friend of Bruce's.
- "Save Me" - A music video to accompany the lead single from the album was released on 10 March 2013. The video was shot in LA and was directed by Maximilla Lukacs, with Bruce commenting that the pair "instantly clicked" and were interested in the same themes.
- "Alive" - The music video for second single 'Alive' was released on 19 May 2013 and was directed by James Lawes, who had previously directed the video for 'The Fall'.

== Track listing ==
No.	Title	Writer(s)	Producer(s)	Length
1.	"Landslide"	Catherine Brudenell-Bruce; Henry Binns; Jodi Milliner; Tom Leonard	Binns; Milliner	3:23
2.	"Save Me"	Brudenell-Bruce; Michelle Lena Poole; Matt Schwartz	Schwartz	4:13
3.	"Alive"	Brudenell-Bruce; Danny O'Donoghue; James Barry	Binns; Milliner; O'Donoghue^{[a]}	3:18
4.	"Speed the Fire"	Brudenell-Bruce; Johnny McDaid; Tommy Ashby; James Flannigan; Gita Langley	Flannigan	4:38
5.	"Telescope"	Brudenell-Bruce; Binns; Milliner; Leonard	Binns; Milliner	4:21
6.	"Ghost Town"	Brudenell-Bruce; Karen Poole; David Etherington	Etherington; Poole^{[b]}	3:52
7.	"On the Wire"	Brudenell-Bruce; K. Poole; Etherington	Etherington; Poole^{[b]}	3:38
8.	"Holding the Light"	Brudenell-Bruce	Al Rudd; Nick Southwood	3:39
9.	"Lightkeeper"	Brudenell-Bruce; McDaid	Flannigan	4:18
10.	"The Fall"	Brudenell-Bruce; McDaid; Ingrid Michaelson	Flannigan	4:34
11.	"The Hands I Hold"	Brudenell-Bruce; Binns; Xavier Pazmino; Sia Furler; Greg Kurstin	Binns; Kurstin	4:32
12.	"Echoes"	Brudenell-Bruce; Binns; Milliner; Ian Dench	Binns; Milliner	3:50
13.	"Golden"	Brudenell-Bruce; Flannigan; Nabiha Bensouda; Anders Grahn; Shirley Gordon; Constandia Costi	Flannigan	3:55
14.	"How We're Made"	Brudenell-Bruce; McDaid	McDaid	5:22

Digital Deluxe edition bonus tracks
No.	Title	Writer(s)	Producer(s)	Length
15.	"Search the Night"	Brudenell-Bruce; Tom Marsh	Marsh	4:40
16.	"Another Life"	Brudenell-Bruce; Joel Laslett Pott	Pott	3:32
17.	"Over & Over (Run With the Horses)"	Brudenell-Bruce; Marsh; Pott	Pott	3:19

Amazon Digital Deluxe Edition Bonus Track
No.	Title	Length
18.	"Charlie Brown" (Live Acoustic)	3:07

Notes

- ^{^[a]} signifies an original producer
- ^{^[b]} signifies a vocal producer

== Personnel ==
Credits adapted from Before I Sleep liner notes.

Instrumental and vocals

- Bo Bruce - vocals (all tracks); backing vocals (all tracks); extra keyboards (3)
- Henry Binns - guitars (1, 12); keyboards (1, 12); drums (3); piano (5)
- Ian Dench - extra guitar (3); guitars (12)
- David Etherington - all instruments (6–7)
- James Flannigan - all instruments (4, 9); piano (10); additional backing vocals (13)
- Matt Harris - bass (9, 13); additional backing vocals (13)
- Greg Kurstin - drums (11); guitar (11); bass (11); keyboards (11)
- Amy Langley - cello (4)
- Gita Langley - violin (2–4)
- Tom Leonard - piano (1); extra guitar (5)
- Alex Maclean - electric guitar (13)
- Max Marlow- drums (6)
- Tom Marsh - drums (2)
- Johnny McDaid - vocals (4); backing vocals (4); all instruments (4, 9, 14)
- Adrian Meehan - drums (8)
- Jodi Milliner - guitars (1, 3, 5, 12); keyboards (1, 3, 12); bass (3, 5, 12); drums (3, 12)
- Rob Mullarkey - cello (3)
- Karen Poole - additional backing vocals (6–7)
- Al Rudd - bass (8); electric guitar (8)
- Matt Schwartz - all instruments (2)
- Tommy Sheen - electric guitar (13); additional backing vocals (13)
- Tom Skinner - drums (1, 12)
- Nick Southwood - acoustic guitar (8)
- Randy Spendlove - acoustic guitar (9)
- Alex Vargas - additional backing vocals (13)
- Ollie Walton - drums (9, 13)

Technical and production

- Bo Bruce - sonic sculpture (all tracks); additional arrangement (all tracks)
- Henry Binns - producer (1, 3, 5, 11–12); mixing (1, 3, 5, 12); sonic supervisor (all tracks)
- Jason Cox - mixing (11)
- Tim Debney - mastering (all tracks)
- David Etherington - producer (6–7); mixing (6–7); programming (6–7)
- James Flannigan - producer (4, 9, 10, 13); mixing (4, 9, 10, 13); programming (10); engineer (10)
- Sam Harper - engineer (4, 9, 13)
- Greg Kurstin - producer (11); programming (11); engineer (11)
- Johnny McDaid - producer (14); mixing (14); additional production (4)
- Jodi Milliner - producer (1, 3, 5, 12)
- Danny O'Donoghue - original production (3)
- Karen Poole - vocal co-producer (6–7)
- Rocky - mastering assistant (all tracks)
- Al Rudd - producer (8); mixing (8); engineer (8); programming (8)
- Matt Schwartz - producer (2); arranging (2); mixing (2)
- Jesse Shatkin - engineer (11)
- Nick Southwood - producer (8); mixing (8); programming (8)
- Tom Stanley - mix assistant (11)

Design

- Stuart Hardie - design
- Eliot Lee Hazel - photography
- Emily Pugh - back of booklet painting

== Charts ==
=== Album ===
Chart (2013)	Peak position
UK Albums (OCC)	10

=== Singles ===
Title	Year	Peak chart positions	Album
Title	Year	UK	Album
"Save Me"	2013	53	Before I Sleep
"Alive"	2013	58	Before I Sleep

== Release history ==
Country	Date	Format	Label
United Kingdom	24 April 2013	CD, digital download	Mercury Records

== See also ==
- List of UK top-ten albums in 2013
