= Britain's Got Talent series 7 =

Britain's Got Talent
- Series 7
- Hosted by: Ant & Dec (ITV); Stephen Mulhern (ITV2)
- Judges: David Walliams; Alesha Dixon; Amanda Holden; Simon Cowell
- Winner: Attraction
- Runner-up: Jack Carroll

Release
- Original network: ITV; ITV2 (BGMT)
- Original release: 13 April – 8 June 2013

Series chronology
- ← Previous; Series 6 Next → Series 8

Judges and Presenter(s) for Britain's Got Talent Series 7

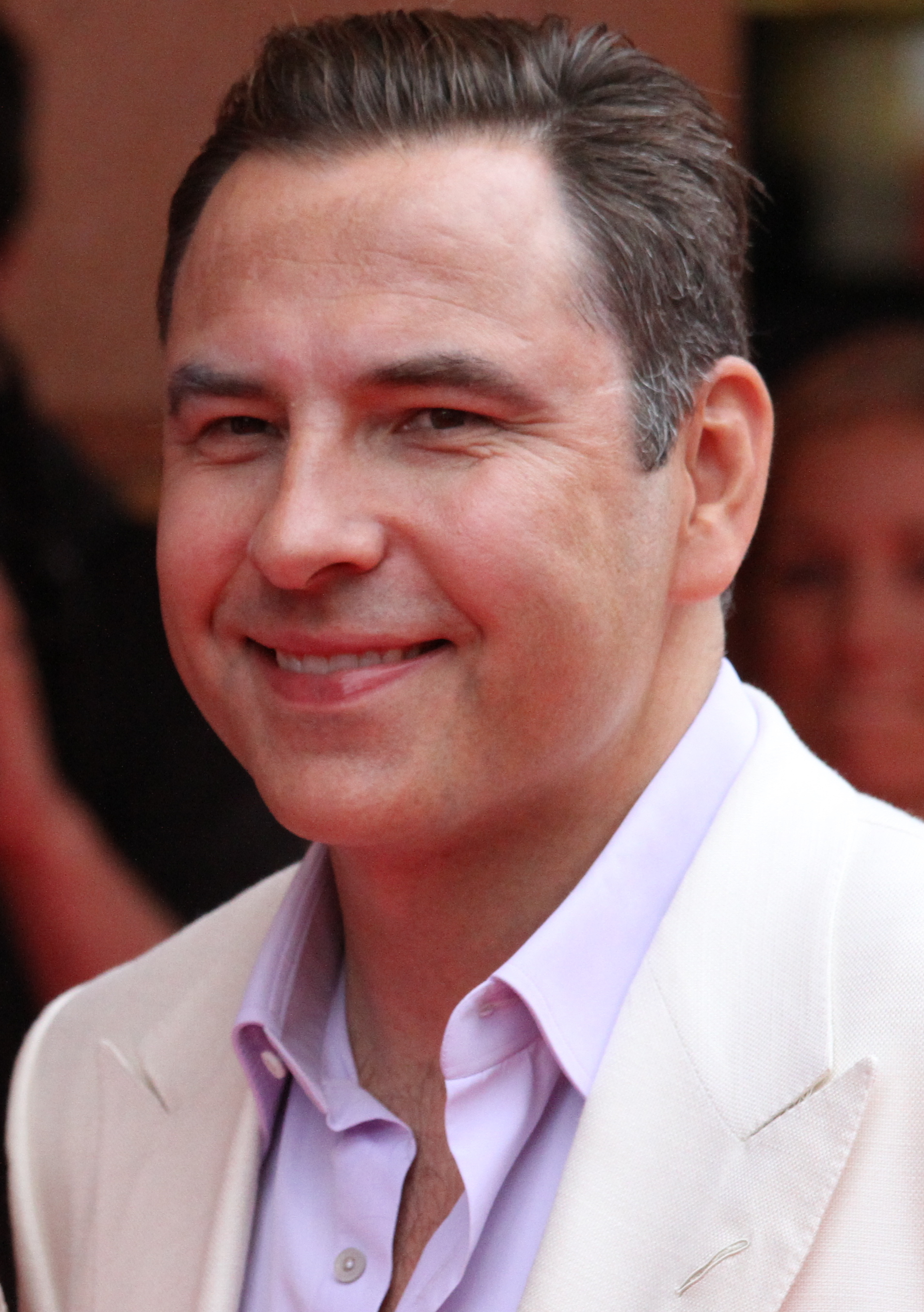
David Walliams

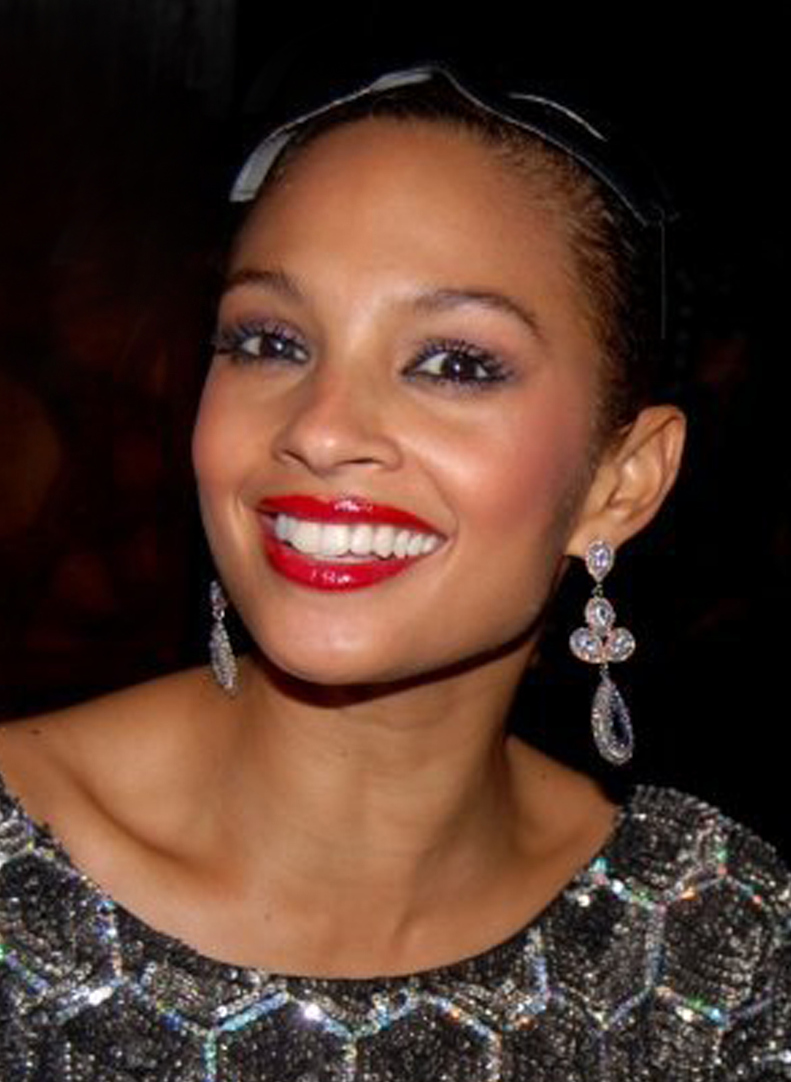
Alesha Dixon

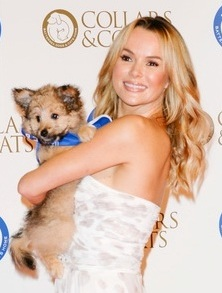
Amanda Holden

Simon Cowell

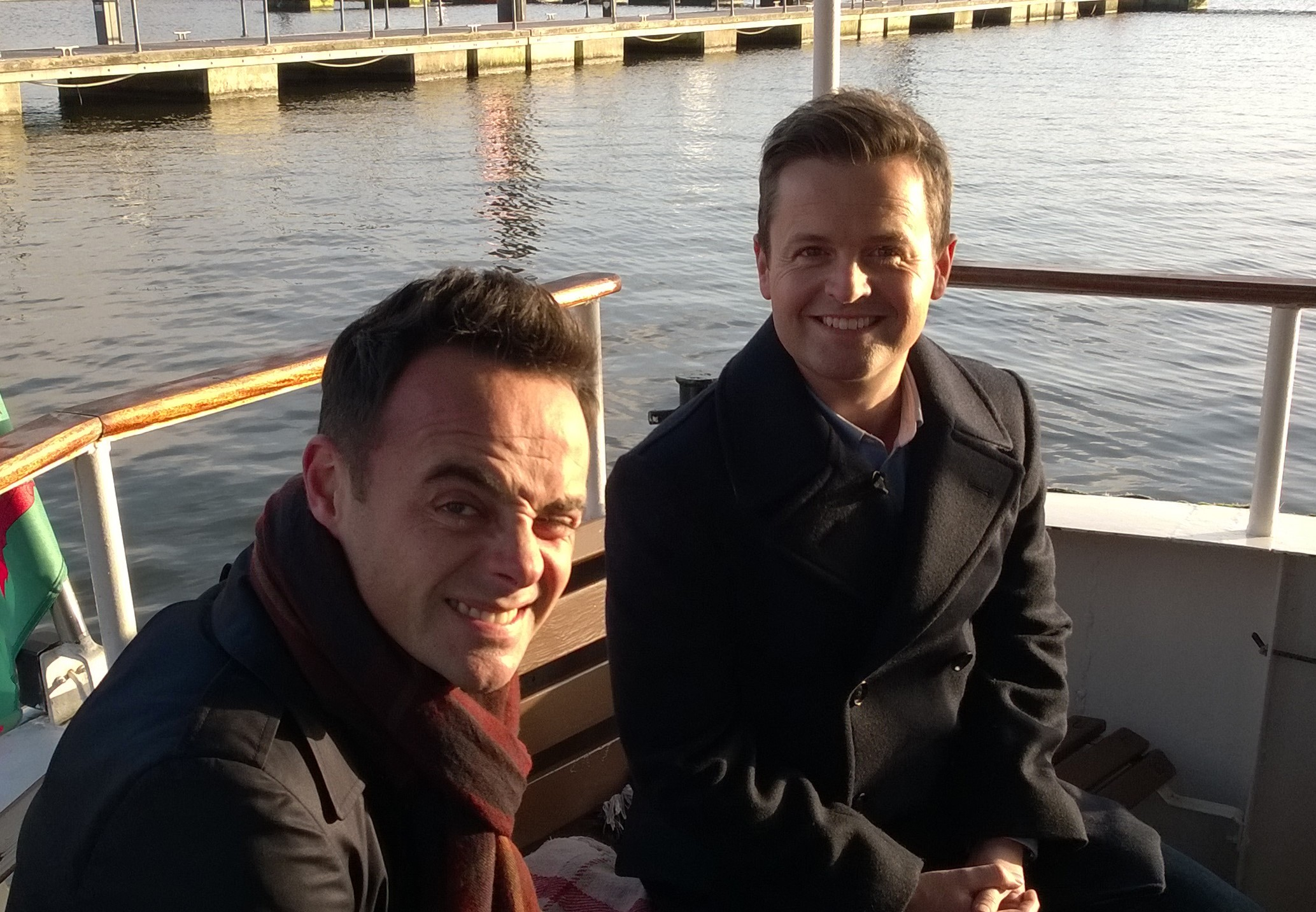
Ant & Dec (ITV1)

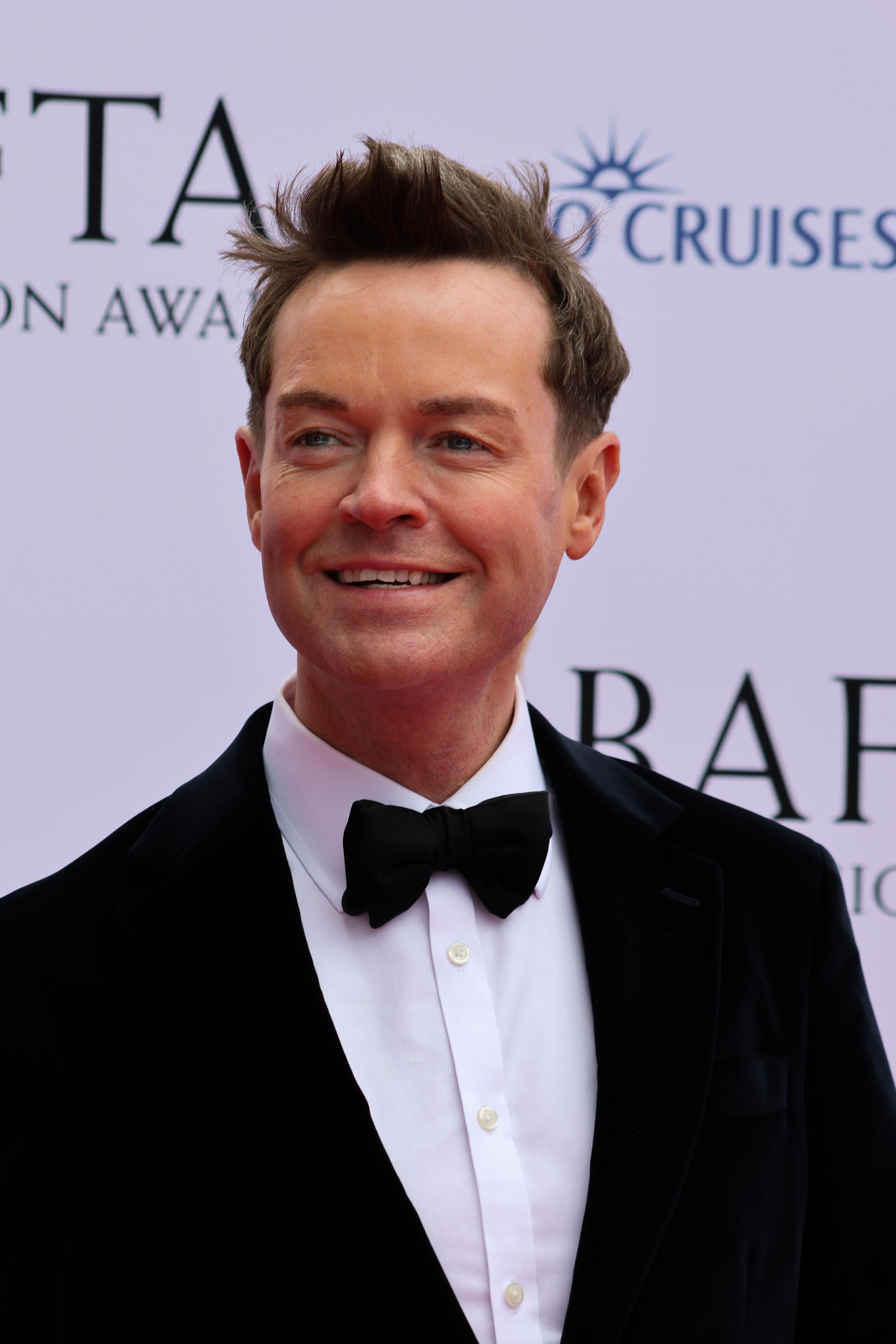
Stephen Mulhern (ITV2)

The seventh series of British talent competition programme Britain's Got Talent was broadcast on ITV, from 13 April to 8 June 2013; because of England's international friendly with the Republic of Ireland that year, the show took a break on 29 May to avoid clashing with live coverage of the match. Because of the work schedule of Stephen Mulhern, host of Britain's Got More Talent, filmed auditions had to be pushed back to mid-January that year, while no guest judge was brought in despite the absence of Simon Cowell for an audition session. Following the previous series, the programme's format was given a minor amendment - the cash prize offered to winners was reduced to £250,000 from this series onwards.

The seventh series was won by shadow theatre troupe Attraction, the first foreign national participant to win the competition, with comedian Jack Carroll finishing in second place and singing duo Richard & Adam third. Additionally, Attraction was the only act to finish first, second, or third through seven series of Britain’s Got Talent, and would remain the only international act to finish in the top-3 in the show’s first ten series. They would eventually be joined by third place Malawian Daliso Chaponda, and in the subsequent series, there have been an additional half dozen international acts finishing in the top-3. During its broadcast, the series averaged around 10.4 million viewers. The programme faced severe criticism from viewers over a number of auditions that were broadcast as part of the sixth series, while production staff had to investigate a breach of security after a protester managed to pelt Cowell with eggs during a live broadcast of a finalist's performance.

== Series overview ==
Following open auditions, the Judges' auditions were held in January and February 2013, within Cardiff, London, Glasgow, Manchester and Birmingham. Although filming was planned to begin by 7 January, it was pushed back to 16 January due to Stephen Mulhern's schedule – as host for Britain's Got More Talent, he would provide feedback and present additional auditions not featured on the main programme, but filming on the original date would have clashed with his involvement for Catchphrase that month. Most of the auditions that took place were uneventful; although Cowell was forced to miss most of the auditions on the second day in Manchester due to illness, production staff opted to proceed with these without bringing in a guest judge to stand in for him.

Of the participants that took part, only forty five made it past this stage and into the five live semi-finals, with nine appearing in each one, and eleven of these acts making it into the live final; the wildcard act chosen by the judges was ventriloquist Steve Hewlett, after he lost out in the Judges' vote in the fifth semi-final. The following below lists the results of each participant's overall performance in this series:

Winner | Runner-up | Finalist
Semi-finalist | Judges' Wildcard Finalist

Participant	Age(s) ^{1}	Genre	Performance Type	Semi-final	Result
Aaron Crow	44	Danger	Danger Act	1	Eliminated
AJ & Chloe	17 & 18	Dance	Latin Dance Duo	4	Eliminated
Alex Keirl	20	Singing	Singer	4	Eliminated
Alice Fredenham	28	Singing	Singer	2	Eliminated
Aliki	29	Singing	Singer	5	Eliminated
Arisxandra	11	Singing	Singer	1	Finalist
Asanda	11	Singing	Singer	4	Finalist
Attraction	19–40	Dance	Shadow Theatre Group	5	Winner
Band of Voices	27-47	Singing	Vocal Group	1	Eliminated
Bosom Buddies	29 & 48	Singing	Opera Singing Duo	1	Eliminated
CEO Dancers	22–24	Dance	Dance Trio	5	Eliminated
Chasing The Dream	19-50	Singing	Theatre Group	4	Eliminated
Club Town Freaks	25–38	Singing	Vocal Group	4	Eliminated
Francine Lewis	37	Comedy	Impressionist	4	Finalist
Freelusion	25–39	Dance	Electronic Dance Group	3	Eliminated
Gabz	14	Singing / Music	Singer & Pianist	2	Finalist
Gospel Singers Incognito	17–43	Singing	Gospel Choir	5	Eliminated
J-Unity	19	Singing / Music	Singing Duo & Guitarist	1	Eliminated
Jack & Cormac	13 & 14	Singing / Music	Singing Duo & Guitarist	2	Eliminated
Jack Carroll	14	Comedy	Stand Up Comedian	2	Runner-Up
James More	24	Magic	Illusionist	4	Eliminated
Jordan O'Keefe	18	Singing / Music	Singer & Guitarist	5	Finalist
Joseph Hall	36	Dance	Dancer	3	Eliminated
Luminites	18–21	Singing / Music	Band	3	Finalist
Maarty Broekman	23	Singing / Music	Singer & Keytar Musician	5	Eliminated
Martin & Marielle	32 & 36	Acrobatics / Dance	Acrobatic Dance Duo	2	Eliminated
Martin Healey	57	Dance	Ballroom Dancer	1	Eliminated
MC Boy	22	Singing	Rapper	3	Eliminated
McKnasty	27	Music	Drummer & DJ	2	Eliminated
MD Dancers	14–22	Dance	Dance Group	2	Eliminated
Meat Diva	31 & 27	Singing	Cabaret Singing Duo	2	Eliminated
Modupe	19	Singing	Singer	2	Eliminated
Philip Green	21	Comedy	Impressionist	1	Eliminated
Poppin'Ron	21	Dance	Bodypopper	4	Eliminated
Pre-Skool	5–8	Dance	Dance Group	3	Finalist
Richard & Adam	19 & 22	Singing	Opera Singing Duo	1	Third Place
Robbie Kennedy	22	Singing / Music	Singer & Guitarist	3	Eliminated
Rob's Duelling Pianos ^{2}	55	Music	Pianist	5	Eliminated
Rosie O'Sullivan	19	Singing	Singer	3	Eliminated
Shockarellas	12–17	Dance	Dance Group	4	Eliminated
Steve Hewlett	37	Comedy	Ventriloquist	5	Finalist
Stevie Pink	45	Magic	Illusionist	3	Eliminated
The Glambassadors	21–36	Dance	Dance Group	5	Eliminated
Thomas Bounce	16	Variety	Juggler	3	Eliminated
Youth Creation	7–14	Dance	Dance Group	1	Eliminated

- ^1 Ages denoted for a participant(s), pertain to their final performance for this series.
- ^2 Rob's Duelling Pianos became a solo act, after a member of the act left before the semi-final.

=== Semi-finals summary ===
Buzzed out | Judges' vote | Won the public vote
Won the judges' vote | Lost the judges' vote | Eliminated

==== Semi-final 1 (27 May) ====
- Guest performance: Ellie Goulding ("Explosions"/"Anything Could Happen")

Semi-Finalist	Order	Performance Type	Buzzes and Judges' Vote				Percentage	Result
Semi-Finalist	Order	Performance Type	Cowell	Holden	Dixon	Walliams	Percentage	Result
Martin Healey	1	Ballroom Dancer					0.1%	9th - Eliminated
Band of Voices	2	Vocal Group					1.9%	6th - Eliminated
Youth Creation	3	Dance Group					7.2%	3rd (Judges' vote tied - Lost on Public vote)
J-Unity	4	Singing Duo & Guitarist					1.5%	7th - Eliminated
Bosom Buddies	5	Opera Singing Duo					1.0%	8th - Eliminated
Philip Green	6	Impressionist					3.3%	5th - Eliminated
Arisxandra	7	Singer					13.4%	2nd (Judges' vote tied - Won on Public vote)
Aaron Crow	8	Danger Act					5.6%	4th - Eliminated
Richard & Adam	9	Opera Singing Duo					66.0%	1st (Won Public vote)

==== Semi-final 2 (28 May) ====
- Guest performance: Jennifer Lopez ("Live It Up")

Semi-Finalist	Order	Performance Type	Buzzes and Judges' Vote				Percentage	Result
Semi-Finalist	Order	Performance Type	Cowell	Holden	Dixon	Walliams	Percentage	Result
Martin & Marielle	1	Acrobatic Dance Duo					0.6%	8th - Eliminated
McKnasty	2	DJ & Drummer					2.7%	5th - Eliminated
Jack & Cormac	3	Singing Duo & Guitarist					15.0%	3rd (Lost Judges' vote)
Modupe	4	Singer					0.5%	9th - Eliminated
Meat Diva	5	Cabaret Singing Duo					1.5%	7th - Eliminated
MD	6	Dance Group					2.3%	6th - Eliminated
Alice Fredenham	7	Singer					12.3%	4th - Eliminated
Jack Carroll	8	Stand Up Comedian					42.5%	1st (Won Public Vote)
Gabz	9	Singer & Pianist	^{3}				22.6%	2nd (Won Judges' vote)

- ^3 Cowell did not cast his vote due to the majority support for Gabz from the other judges, but admitted that his voting intention would have been for this semi-finalist.

==== Semi-final 3 (30 May) ====
- Guest performance: Demi Lovato ("Heart Attack")

Semi-Finalist	Order	Performance Type	Buzzes and Judges' Vote				Percentage	Result
Semi-Finalist	Order	Performance Type	Cowell	Holden	Dixon	Walliams	Percentage	Result
Freelusion	1	Electronic Dance Group					0.9%	7th - Eliminated
Robbie Kennedy	2	Singer & Guitarist					12.6%	5th - Eliminated
Stevie Pink	3	Illusionist					0.7%	8th - Eliminated
Pre-Skool	4	Dance Group					16.9%	2nd (Judges' vote tied - Won on Public vote)
Thomas Bounce	5	Juggler					0.6%	9th - Eliminated
Rosie O'Sullivan	6	Singer					15.4%	4th - Eliminated
Joseph Hall	7	Dancer					16.4%	3rd (Judges' vote tied - Lost on Public vote)
MC Boy	8	Rapper		^{4}			0.9%	6th - Eliminated
Luminites	9	Band					35.6%	1st (Won Public vote)

- ^4 Cowell pressed Holden's buzzer for MC Boy, though it was never retracted during the comments.

==== Semi-final 4 (31 May) ====
- Guest performance: Olly Murs ("Right Place Right Time")

Semi-Finalist	Order	Performance Type	Buzzes and Judges' Vote				Percentage	Result
Semi-Finalist	Order	Performance Type	Cowell	Holden	Dixon	Walliams	Percentage	Result
Club Town Freaks	1	Vocal Group					1.3%	9th - Eliminated
Alex Keirl	2	Singer					21.4%	2nd (Lost Judges' vote)
Shockarellas	3	Dance Group					3.4%	6th - Eliminated
Poppin'Ron	4	Bodypopper					2.1%	8th - Eliminated
James More	5	Illusionist					14.3%	4th - Eliminated
Chasing The Dream	6	Theatre Group					2.2%	7th - Eliminated
Francine Lewis	7	Impressionist					23.2%	1st (Won Public vote)
Asanda	8	Singer					19.4%	3rd (Won Judges' vote)
AJ & Chloe	9	Latin Dance Duo					12.7%	5th - Eliminated

==== Semi-final 5 (1 June) ====
- Guest performance: Ashleigh and Pudsey

Artist	Order	Performance Type	Buzzes and Judges' Vote				Percentage	Result
Artist	Order	Performance Type	Cowell	Holden	Dixon	Walliams	Percentage	Result
CEO Dancers	1	Dance Trio					1.2%	7th - Eliminated
Aliki	2	Singer					6.6%	4th - Eliminated
The Glambassadors	3	Dance Group					1.1%	8th - Eliminated
Steve Hewlett ^{5}	4	Ventriloquist					12.0%	3rd (Judges' vote tied - Lost on Public vote)
Rob's Duelling Pianos	5	Pianist					0.4%	9th - Eliminated
Maarty Broekman	6	Singer & Keytar Musician					2.0%	6th - Eliminated
Gospel Singers Incognito	7	Gospel Choir					2.5%	5th - Eliminated
Jordan O'Keefe	8	Singer & Guitarist					15.1%	2nd (Judges' vote tied - Won on Public vote)
Attraction	9	Shadow Theatre Group					59.1%	1st (Won Public vote)

- ^5 Steve Hewlett was later sent through to the final as the judges wildcard.

=== Final (8 June) ===
- Guest performances: Psy ("Gentleman") & Taylor Swift and Ed Sheeran ("Everything Has Changed")

Winner | Runner-up

Finalist	Order	Performance Type	Percentage	Finished
Pre-Skool	1	Dance Group	2.8%	9th
Asanda	2	Singer	1.2%	11th
Gabz	3	Singer & Pianist	3.6%	7th
Steve Hewlett	4	Ventriloquist	14.7%	4th
Jordan O'Keefe	5	Singer & Guitarist	3.7%	6th
Arisxandra	6	Singer	2.9%	8th
Francine Lewis	7	Impressionist	2.0%	10th
Richard & Adam	8	Opera Singing Duo	15.4%	3rd
Jack Carroll	9	Stand Up Comedian	20.1%	2nd
Luminites	10	Band	6.8%	5th
Attraction	11	Shadow Theatre Group	27.0%	1st

== Ratings ==
Episode	Date	Total ITV viewers (millions)	Weekly rank	Share (%)
Auditions 1	13 April	12.13	1	36.9
Auditions 2	20 April	11.86	1	43.9
Auditions 3	27 April	11.08	1	43.9
Auditions 4	4 May	11.59	1	45.0
Auditions 5	11 May	12.36	1	45.2
Auditions 6	18 May	10.88	1	38.1
Auditions 7	26 May	9.74	3	38.0
Semi-final 1	27 May	11.48	1	41.5
Semi-final 1 results	27 May	9.27	10	31.4
Semi-final 2	28 May	10.20	6	36.5
Semi-final 2 results	28 May	8.39	14	28.5
Semi-final 3	30 May	9.76	8	37.5
Semi-final 3 results	30 May	8.51	13	32.3
Semi-final 4	31 May	9.98	7	37.5
Semi-final 4 results	31 May	8.71	12	32.7
Semi-final 5	1 June	9.74	9	41.9
Semi-final 5 results	1 June	9.04	11	32.8
Live final	8 June	12.85	1	48.9

== Criticism & incidents ==
=== Unsuitable, and "sexualised" auditions ===
The seventh series faced criticism from viewers, covering two sets of complaints regarding auditions that were conducted in the 2013 contest. The first set concerned the nature of auditions made by Scarlet Cuffs, Keri Graham and Kelly Fox, that were deemed unsuitable for a family-orientated programme and for broadcast before the 9pm watershed - both Cuffs and Graham conducted a provocative striptease as part of their auditions, while Fox used lyrics that were considered vulgar. Ofcom investigated the editing of the auditions by the striptease acts, and ruled that while Graham's had been carefully censored to an acceptable level, they found in contrast that censoring of Cuffs' audition was insufficient and that the footage breached broadcasting codes in regards to protecting children from unsuitable content, with it made clear that the act should not have been shown. Fox refuted criticism on her performance, yet a member of the National Association of Head Teachers raised questions over the "morality" of allowing the audition footage to be shown.

The second set focused on the audition of two young children, Arisxandra Libantino, and Asanda, who used songs in their performances that were deemed inappropriate for their age - Libantino's performance involved singing Jennifer Hudson's "One Night Only", while Asanda's involved the singing of Rihanna's "Diamonds" alongside a provocative dance routine. The release of the footage by ITV raised questions from Vivienne Pattison, director of Mediawatch UK, over the programme's portrayal of children, deeming the auditions as effectively "sexualising children" on television.

=== Cowell-Holt "eggate" in final ===
Security arrangements for the programme came under questioning during the latter half of the series, after a protester managed to infiltrate the live finals and conduct a protest against both miming on live television shows and Simon Cowell's influence in the music industry. The programme had to make clear that the protester, musician Natalie Holt, was not conducting a publicity stunt, when she took to the stage during the performance of finalists Richard & Adam in order to throw eggs at Cowell. The investigation into the breach found that Holt managed not only to circumvent security processes by posing as a backing musician for the finalists, but was able to smuggle in the eggs due to inadequate examinations of her possessions. The motive for her protest was later revealed to be what she said as protesting Cowell's "dreadful influence on the music business".
