= Richard & Adam =

Welsh classical singing duo

- Also known as: The Johnson Brothers
- Born: Holywell, Flintshire, Wales
- Genres: Classical, opera, popera
- Years active: 2012–present
- Label: Sony Music
- Members: Adam Johnson; Richard Johnson
- Website: richardandadamofficial.co.uk

Richard and Adam Johnson, performing as Richard & Adam, are a Welsh classical singing duo, best known for finishing in third place on the seventh series of Britain's Got Talent in 2013. They come from Holywell in Flintshire, Wales. Their debut album The Impossible Dream topped the UK Albums Chart and spent four consecutive weeks at number one, making it the longest-running number-one album of 2013 in the UK.

== Early career ==
After working in their parents' sandwich shop in Holywell, Wales, the brothers performed on cruise ships one of which was the P&O Cruises ship Azura and also performed on the British talk show Loose Women as "The Johnson Brothers".

== Career ==
=== Britain's Got Talent ===
Richard and Adam auditioned for Britain's Got Talent in January 2013 and was aired in April 2013. They performed 'The Impossible Dream' and were put through to the next round by the judges. The duo performed on the first live show with "Somewhere" and won with the most votes cast with over 66% of the vote, putting them through to the final.

In the Britain's Got Talent final, Richard & Adam once again performed "The Impossible Dream". In the middle of their performance, one of the members of the orchestra performing behind them—later identified as violinist Natalie Holt—stood up and started throwing eggs at Simon Cowell. The producers immediately escorted her off the stage while the duo continued. They finished third with 15.4% of the vote.

=== The Impossible Dream, The Christmas Album and At the Movies ===
In June 2013, Richard & Adam were signed to Sony Music. They released their debut album, The Impossible Dream, including the single cover of the same name on 29 July 2013. The album was released by Arista Records, the duo's current label. The album debuted at number one on the UK Albums Chart on 4 August. In its second week on sale, despite competition from US duo The Civil Wars, Richard & Adam held onto the Official Albums Chart Number 1 spot for a second week. The album contains covers of songs such as "Somewhere", "Amazing Grace" and "Bring Him Home". The album stayed at number one for four consecutive weeks.

On 12 September 2013, Richard & Adam announced details of their second album, The Christmas Album, which was released on 2 December. The album put an operatic twist on Christmas songs such as "Away in a Manger", "Silent Night" and "Once in Royal David's City".

In May 2014, it was announced that Richard & Adam's third album would be called At the Movies, composed of songs from soundtracks. The album debuted at number five on the UK Albums Chart.

In 2019 they took part in Britain's Got Talent: The Champions, though were eliminated in the preliminaries.

== Discography ==
=== Albums ===
Title	Album details	Peak chart positions		Sales	Certifications
Title	Album details	UK	SCO	Sales	Certifications
The Impossible Dream	Released: 29 July 2013; Label: Sony Music; Formats: CD, digital download	1	1	UK: 100,000	BPI: Gold
The Christmas Album	Released: 2 December 2013; Label: Sony Music; Formats: CD, digital download	24	37		
At the Movies	Released: 8 August 2014; Label: Sony Music; Formats: CD, digital download	5	13		
Believe – Songs of Inspiration	Released: 26 February 2016; Label: Sony Music; Formats: CD, digital download	9			

=== Singles ===
Year	Title	Title
2013	"I Saw Three Ships Come Sailing In (On Christmas Day)"	The Christmas Album

== Tours ==
Following The Impossible Dream retaining number one on the charts, the brothers toured the UK in 2014.
