= Snapshot (The Strypes album) =

Studio album by The Strypes
- Released: 9 September 2013
- Recorded: 2012–2013
- Genre: Blues rock, Rock & roll
- Length: 38:25
- Label: Virgin EMI
- Producer: Chris Thomas

The Strypes chronology
Snapshot (2013)	Little Victories (2015)

Singles from Snapshot
- 1. "Blue Collar Jane" Released: 28 March 2013; 2. "Hometown Girls" Released: 30 May 2013; 3. "What a Shame" Released: 31 July 2013; 4. "Mystery Man" Released: 27 August 2013; 5. "You Can't Judge a Book by the Cover" Released: 5 November 2013

Snapshot is the debut studio album by Irish rock band The Strypes, released on 9 September 2013. The album was produced by highly acclaimed record producer Chris Thomas at Yellow Fish Studios, England. The title of the album derives from the band's intention while recording the album to create a "snapshot" of their live set that got them noticed in the first place.

The album contains singles "Blue Collar Jane", "Hometown Girls", "What a Shame", "Mystery Man" and "You Can't Judge a Book by the Cover".

== Critical reception ==
Professional ratings
Aggregate scores
Source	Rating
Metacritic	64/100
Review scores
Source	Rating
The Independent	4/5 stars
NME	7/10 stars
Clash Music	7/10 stars
The Guardian	2/5 stars
This Is Fake DIY	3/10 stars
Hot Press	4/5 stars
The Irish Times	2/5 stars
The Gig Review	4/5 stars
The Times	3/5 stars

The album has received positive to mixed reviews. The Independent raved the album as "a scintillating shot of roughneck rhythm and blues," by giving it a 4/5 star review. Simon Harper of Clash Magazine said that "with such infectious energy and lyrics capturing the timeless topics of youth, really: what's not to like? Harmonica sales will soar". Mojo also gave the album a rave review, stating that "It's nigh on impossible not to succumb to the band's hurtling energy and panache" and that "only a corpse wouldn't holler 'go, cats, go!'"

== Track listing ==
All tracks composed and written by The Strypes, except where noted.

No.	Title	Length
1.	"Mystery Man"	2:43
2.	"Blue Collar Jane"	2:51
3.	"I'm a Hog for You Baby (deluxe edition/vinyl track)" (Jerry Leiber and Mike Stoller)	3:36
4.	"What the People Don't See"	2:57
5.	"She's So Fine"	2:20
6.	"I Can Tell" (Samuel Smith, McDaniel)	3:42
7.	"Angel Eyes"	4:11
8.	"Perfect Storm"	2:24
9.	"You Can't Judge a Book by the Cover" (Willie Dixon)	2:16
10.	"What a Shame"	2:25
11.	"Hometown Girls"	3:05
12.	"Heart of the City" (Nick Lowe)	3:19
13.	"Rollin' and Tumblin'" (Hambone Willie Newbern)	4:04

Deluxe edition track listing
No.	Title	Length
14.	"Beautiful Delilah" (Chuck Berry)	2:01
15.	"C C Rider (live at King Tuts, Glasgow/2013)"	3:51
16.	"I Can Tell (live at King Tuts, Glasgow/2013)"	3:46

== Personnel ==
- Ross Farrelly - lead vocals, harmonica, percussion, guitar on "What a Shame" and "Angel Eyes"
- Josh McClorey - lead guitar, vocals on "Perfect Storm" and "She's So Fine"
- Pete O'Hanlon - bass guitar, harmonica on "Blue Collar Jane" & "Rollin' & Tumblin'", keyboards on "What a Shame"
- Evan Walsh - drums, percussion, keyboards on "What a Shame"

== Charts ==
=== Weekly charts ===
Chart (2013–14)	Peak position
Belgian Albums (Ultratop Flanders)	38
Belgian Albums (Ultratop Wallonia)	145
Dutch Albums (Album Top 100)	45
French Albums (SNEP)	75
Irish Albums (IRMA)	2
UK Albums (OCC)	5

=== Year-end charts ===
Chart (2014)	Position
Belgian Albums (Ultratop Flanders)	197
