= Bo Bruce =

English singer-songwriter (born 1984)

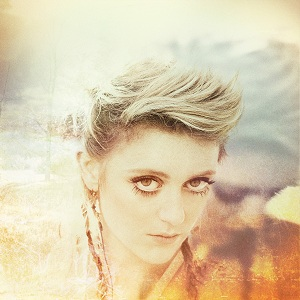
- Bruce in 2012

Background information
- Born: Catherine Anna Brudenell-Bruce; 25 November 1984 (age 41); Swindon, Wiltshire, England
- Genres: Pop, rock, indie
- Occupation: Singer-songwriter
- Instrument: Vocals
- Years active: 2008–present
- Label: Mercury (2012–2013)

Lady Catherine Anna Brudenell-Bruce (née Brudenell-Bruce; born 25 November 1984), known as Bo Bruce, is an English singer-songwriter. She released an EP, Search the Night (2010), and an album, Before I Sleep (2013), both of which received a degree of chart success. She is also known for her appearance on The Voice UK. In 2015, Bruce and her future husband, Henry Binns, formed Equador.

== Early life and family ==
Bo Bruce was born Lady Catherine Anna Brudenell-Bruce, the daughter of David Brudenell-Bruce, 9th Marquess of Ailesbury, and his first wife, Rosamond Winkley. Bruce is also a granddaughter of Michael Brudenell-Bruce, 8th Marquess of Ailesbury. She has an older brother, Thomas Brudenell-Bruce, Earl of Cardigan. Her family's seat is Tottenham House, set on a 4,500-acre estate in Wiltshire near Savernake Forest. Bruce and her brother grew up at Savernake Lodge on the estate. Bruce was close to her mother, who died of pancreatic cancer in 2012. She won a High Court action in February 2022 when her brother was removed as administrator of their mother's estate. Bruce is also a distant cousin of lingerie model Florence Brudenell-Bruce, and was educated at Marlborough College in Wiltshire and Port Regis, in Dorset.

== Music career ==
=== 2010-11: Early career and Search the Night EP ===
Bruce digitally released an EP entitled Search The Night on 12 December 2010. It featured the songs "Behind The Gates", "Waking", "Fighting Arizona", "Crossfire", and "Black Ice"; the latter was submitted upon applying for the Channel 4 competition "Orange Unsigned Act" while "Fighting Arizona" was performed during the broadcast. Music videos were made for both "Fighting Arizona" (August 2010) and "Black Ice" (September 2011). Sales of the EP began to increase after Bruce became featured on The Voice UK and peaked at number two on the iTunes album charts on 4 June 2012.

On 15 August 2011, Bruce released a collaboration with DJ's/Producers Simon Patterson and Greg Downey entitled "Come to Me".

=== 2012: The Voice UK ===
Bruce auditioned for The Voice UK in 2012. In her blind audition, Bruce sang the David Guetta/Usher hit "Without You". Coaches will.i.am and Danny O'Donoghue turned around in a bid to add her to their teams, and she opted to join Team Danny. In the battle round, Bruce performed with Vince Freeman, duetting on the U2 classic "With or Without You". O'Donoghue put her through to the live rounds. During the live show of 5 May 2012, Bruce sang "Running Up That Hill" by Kate Bush, received praise from all four coaches, and was voted through to the next round of the competition with the viewers' vote.

Performed	Song	Original artist	Result
Blind Audition	"Without You"	David Guetta feat. Usher	Joined Team Danny
Battle Rounds	"With or Without You" (against Vince Freeman)	U2	Winner
Week 1	"You Get What You Give/Please Don't Stop The Music" (as part of Team Danny & Team Jessie group performance)	New Radicals/Rihanna	—N/a
Week 2	"Running Up That Hill"	Kate Bush	Safe
Week 3	"Starlight" (as part of Team Danny)	Muse	—N/a
Week 4	"Love the Way You Lie (Part II)"	Rihanna	Safe
Week 4	"Somebody That I Used To Know" (as part of Team Danny)	Gotye	Safe
Semi-final	"Charlie Brown"	Coldplay	Safe
Semi-final	"You're the Voice" (as part of The Voice UK Semi-finalists)	John Farnham	Safe
Final	"Nothing Compares 2 U"	Sinéad O'Connor	Runner-up
Final	"Read All About It" (with Danny O'Donoghue)	Professor Green feat. Emeli Sande	Runner-up
Final	"Charlie Brown"	Coldplay	Runner-up

=== 2012-2014: After The Voice UK ===
During the broadcast of The Voice UK, Bruce's collaboration with Mike Shiver called 'Still Here' was released.

In the week following the final of The Voice UK, Bruce's 2010 EP Search the Night charted at No. 19. Soon after this, Bruce announced that she had been signed to Mercury Records. She performed her debut show at The Garage on 16 August 2012, and later performed at the V Festival and at T in the Park. Bruce featured on the track "Damaged" by DJ/Producer Kryder, released as a download-only single in October 2012. Shortly after the end of The Voice UK, sessions for her debut album began.

The music video for Bruce's song entitled "The Fall" was released on 27 November 2012, while it was confirmed that the track would be also appearing on her debut album. In March 2013, Bruce signed a publishing deal with Polar Patrol Publishing, which was set up by members of Snow Patrol and currently publishes a number of artists and songwriters, including Johnny McDaid of Snow Patrol and Here We Go Magic. Her first single, "Save Me", and her debut album, Before I Sleep were released on 29 April 2013. Upon release, the album reached no. 10 in the UK Albums Chart.

On 24 April 2013, it was announced that Bruce had collaborated on a track with Gary Lightbody of Snow Patrol, entitled "The Rage That's in Us All", for the motion picture Star Trek Into Darkness released in cinemas on 9 May 2013.

Bruce's relationship with her label Mercury ended after the release of second single "Alive", which Bruce believed had been under-promoted. A third single had been planned but the singer "put a stop to it going out [and] pulled the video".

In January 2014, "U" by Gareth Emery, featuring vocals from Bo Bruce, was released and was voted by the listeners of Armin van Buuren radio show 'A State of Trance' as Tune of the Year 2014.

== 2015-present: Equador ==
In 2015, Bruce teamed up with electronic musician Henry Binns (from Zero 7) to form Equador. Equador released the album Bones of Man in 2016 and released two singles off that album, "Blood" and "Bones of Man". In 2019, Equador released the Tribal War EP; the EP featured three new tracks, including "Treble Oh".

=== Discography ===
Year	Release	Title
2016	Single	Bones of Man / Blood
2016	Single	Symmetry / Break Me Gently
2016	Album	Bones of Man
2018	EP	Tribal War

=== Remixes ===
Year	Artist	Title
2016	Equador	Blood (The Remixes)
2016	Equador	Bones of Man (The Remixes)
2017	Equador	Symmetry (Whiney Remix)
2017	Equador	Bones of Man (Gareth Emery Remix)
2017	Equador	Avalon (Sieren Remix)
2017	Tiny Leaves	You Will Be Okay (Equador Rework)
2018	Equador	Winter (Tiny Leaves Rework)
2019	Equador	Tribal War Remixed
2020	Equador	Tribal War (Himalia Edits)

== Personal life ==
In September 2013, it was confirmed that Bruce had entered a rehabilitation facility citing exhaustion.

Bruce married Henry Binns, her collaborator in Equador, in June 2016.

Bruce won a High Court action in February 2022, when her brother was removed as administrator of their mother's estate.

== Discography ==
=== Studio albums ===
- Before I Sleep (2013)

=== Extended plays ===
- Search the Night (2010)

== Discography - singles, features, and writing ==
Year	Artist	Release	Credit
2011	Simon Patterson and Greg Downey featuring Bo Bruce	"Come To Me"	Artist
2012	Mike Shiver featuring Bo Bruce	"Still Here"	Artist
2012	Kryder featuring Bo Bruce	"Damaged"	Vocalist
2013	JJ Abrams and Bo Bruce	"The Rage That's In Us All" (Star Trek: Into Darkness UK Soundtrack)	Vocalist
2014	Gareth Emery and Bo Bruce	"U"	Featured Vocalist
2014	Jurgen Vries featuring Bo Bruce	"Satellites"	Featured Vocalist
2014	Chicane featuring Bo Bruce	"Still With me"	Vocalist
2015	Greg Downey and Bo Bruce	"These Hands I Hold"	Composer, Vocalist
2017	Dash Berlin featuring Bo Bruce	"Coming Home"	Vocalist
2017	Tiny Leaves	"You'll Be Okay (Equador and David O' Dowda remix)"	Featured Artist
2020	ReOrder	"We Are The World"	Composer, Vocalist
2020	Paul van Dyk	"Covered In Gold"	Lyricist, Composer
2021	Alex Kunnari and Bo Bruce	"World On Fire"	Artist/Vocalist
2022	Greg Downey and Bo Bruce	"Another Sun"	Artist/Vocalist/Topliner
2022	Dash Berlin	"All I Want"	Vocalist
2023	Bryan Kearney and Bo Bruce	"Shine A Light"	Vocalist, Songwriter
2023	Christina Novelli and Bo Bruce	"Beautiful Lies"	Writer, Vocalist
2024	Ben Gold	"Half Light"	Composer, Lyricist
2025	Bo Bruce and Paul Webster	"Holding The Light"	Composer, Lyricist
