= List of songs recorded by Dizzee Rascal =

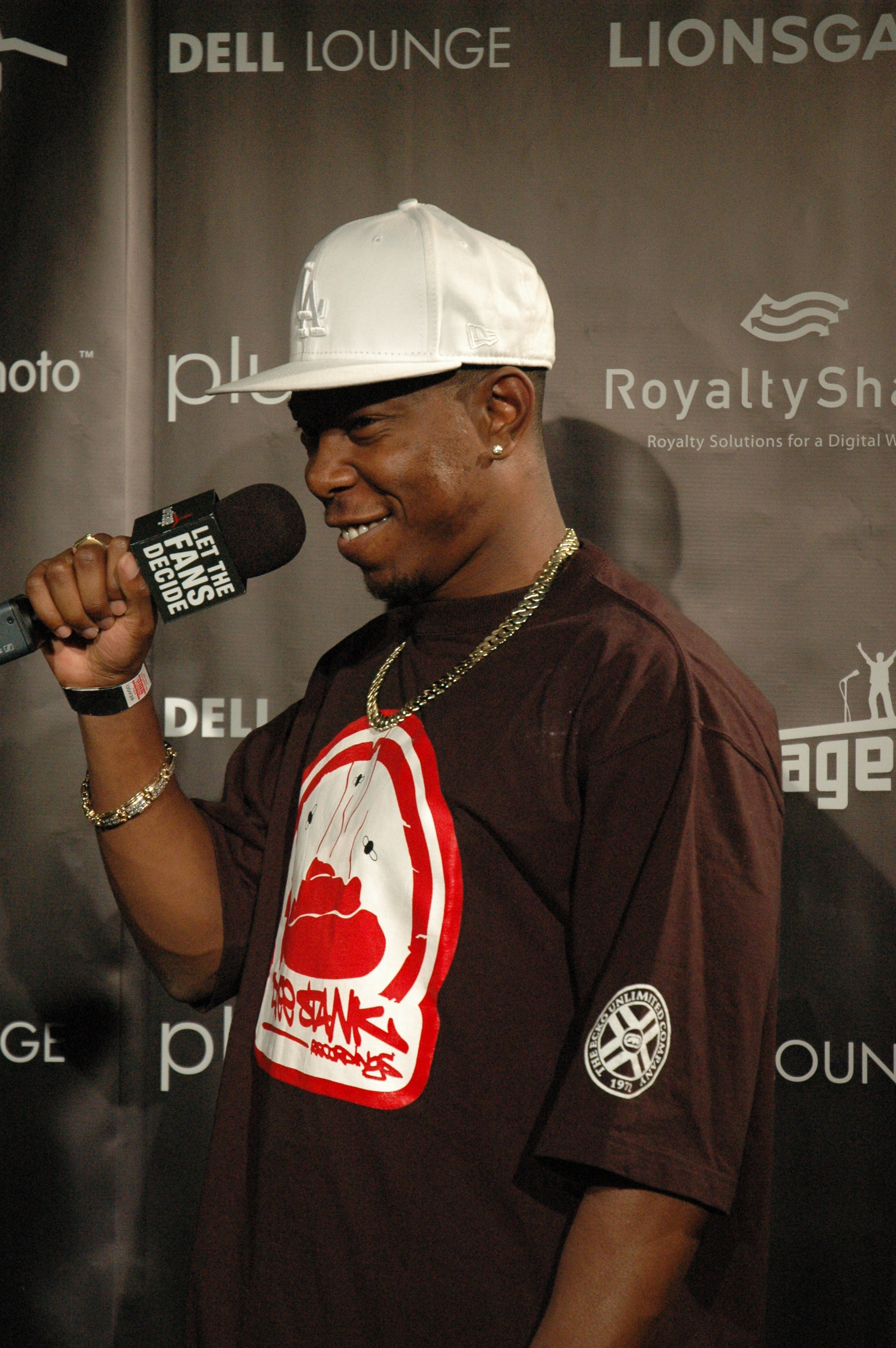
Dizzee Rascal in 2009

Dizzee Rascal is a British rapper and songwriter, who has released eight studio albums, one live album, one extended play, and more than thirty singles since his debut in 2003. Known for pioneering the UK grime scene, Dizzee Rascal's catalog spans genres including grime, hip hop, and hip house, with his debut album Boy in da Corner earning him the Mercury Prize in 2003. His discography features collaborations with prominent artists and includes chart-topping singles such as "Bonkers" and "Dance Wiv Me".

== Songs ==
Key
†	Indicates single release
#	Indicates promotional single release

Song	Artist(s)	Writer(s)	Album(s)	Year	Ref.
"2 Far"	Dizzee Rascal featuring Wiley	Dylan Mills; Richard Cowie Jr.	Boy in da Corner	2003	
"Act Like You Know" †	Dizzee Rascal featuring Smoke Boys	Dylan Mills; Smoke Boys; David Obuamah; Jordan Deepee; Marcelus Kelly; Terell Rookwood	E3 AF	2020	
"Arse Like That"	Dizzee Rascal featuring Sean Kingston	Dylan Mills; Kisean Anderson; Björn Djupström; Nadir Khayat; Geraldo Sandell; Paul Thörnfeldt	The Fifth	2013	
"Back It" †	Yizzy featuring Dizzee Rascal	Yisrael Parkins; Dylan Mills	Non-album single	2019	
"Bad Behaviour"	Dizzee Rascal and Tiësto	Dylan Mills; Tijs Verwest; Floyd Hills	Tongue n' Cheek	2009	
"Bang Bang"	Dizzee Rascal featuring Pop Wansel	Dylan Mills; Andrew Wansel; Warren Felder	The Fifth (Deluxe edition)	2013	
"Bassline Junkie" #	Dizzee Rascal	Dylan Mills; Matthew Coleman	Dirtee TV.com – The Mixtape EP, Vol.2 and The Fifth (bonus track)	2013	
"Be Incredible"	Dizzee Rascal featuring Rob Jones TV	Dylan Mills	E3 AF	2020	
"Black"	Donae'o featuring Dizzee Rascal and JME	Ian Greenidge; Dylan Mills; Jamie Adenuga	Sixteen	2017	
"Blessed" †	Ocean Wisdom featuring Dizzee Rascal	Ocean Wisdom; Dylan Mills	Big Talk, Vol. 1	2019	
"Bluku! Bluku!" †	D Double E featuring Dizzee Rascal	Darren Dixon; Dylan Mills; Samuel Gumbley	Non-album single	2011	
"Body Loose" †	Dizzee Rascal	Dylan Mills; Splurgeboys; Ashley Akabah; Paul Akabah; Tyrone Fagan	E3 AF	2020	
"Bonkers" †	Dizzee Rascal and Armand van Helden	Dylan Mills; Armand van Helden	Tongue n' Cheek	2009	
"Bop n' Keep It Dippin"	Dizzee Rascal	Dylan Mills; Ronald LaTour Jr. Brock Korsan	Raskit	2017	
"Bounce"	Roll Deep featuring Flowdan, Dizzee Rascal, Scratchy, Jet Li, Breeze, Bubbles, Biggie Pitbull, Jamakabi and Wiley	Marc Veira; Dylan Mills; Ryan Williams; Jet Li; Ibrahim Ali; Bubbles; Biggie Pitbull; Jamakabi; Richard Cowie Jr.	Street Anthems	2009 (Note: Recorded in 2002)	
"Brand New Day"	Dizzee Rascal	Dylan Mills	Boy in da Corner	2003	
"Bubbles"	Dizzee Rascal	Dylan Mills; Nick Denton	Maths + English	2007	
"Business Man"	Dizzee Rascal	Dylan Mills; Dan Farber	Raskit	2017	
"Can't Tek No More"	Dizzee Rascal and Shy FX	Dylan Mills; Andre Williams	Tongue n' Cheek	2009	
"Chillin' wiv da Man Dem"	Dizzee Rascal	Dylan Mills; Nick Denton	Tongue n' Cheek	2009	
"Couple Of Stacks"	Dizzee Rascal	Dylan Mills; Daniel Carnegeie	Pagans	2014	
"Cut 'Em Off"	Dizzee Rascal	Dylan Mills	Boy in da Corner	2003	
"Da Feelin"	Dizzee Rascal	Dylan Mills; Peabo Bryson; Andre Williams	Maths + English	2007	
"Daily Duppy"	Dizzee Rascal	Dylan Mills	Non-album song	2022	
"Dance wiv Me" †	Dizzee Rascal featuring Calvin Harris and Chrome	Dylan Mills; Adam Wiles; Tyrone Paul; Nick Denton	Tongue n' Cheek	2008	
"Dean"	Dizzee Rascal	Dylan Mills; Iman Tonge-Grant	Maths + English (Japanese bonus track) (Note: The song first appeared as a b-side on the CD release of the single "Sirens".)	2007	
"Dirtee Cash" †	Dizzee Rascal	Dylan Mills; Nick Denton	Tongue n' Cheek	2009	
"Dirtee Disco" †	Dizzee Rascal	Dylan Mills; Daniel Pearce	Tongue n' Cheek (Dirtee Deluxe edition)	2010	
"Do It!"	Dizzee Rascal	Dylan Mills	Boy in da Corner	2003	
"Do They Know It's Christmas?" †	Band Aid 20	Robert Geldof; James Ure; Nigel Godrich; Dylan Mills	Charity single	2004	
"Doin' It Big"	Dizzee Rascal	Dylan Mills	Tongue n' Cheek (Dirtee Deluxe edition)	2010	
"Don't Be Dumb"	Dizzee Rascal featuring Ocean Wisdom	Dylan Mills; Ocean Wisdom; Splurgeboys; Tyrone Fagan	E3 AF	2020	
"Don't Gas Me"	Dizzee Rascal	Dylan Mills	Don't Gas Me	2018	
"Dream" †	Dizzee Rascal	Dylan Mills; Oscar Hammerstein II; Richard Rodgers	Showtime	2004	
"Driving with Nowhere to Go"	Dizzee Rascal	Dylan Mills	Maths + English (U.S. bonus track)	2008	
"Dummy"	Dizzee Rascal	Dylan Mills; Ronald LaTour Jr.	Raskit	2017	
"Eastside"	Dizzee Rascal featuring Ghetts and Kano	Dylan Mills; Justin Clarke-Samuels; Kane Robinson; Chubby Dread; Platinum 45	E3 AF	2020	
"Energies + Powers"	Dizzee Rascal featuring Alicaì Harley and Steel Banglez	Dylan Mills; Leslieann Harley; Pahuldip Sandhu	E3 AF	2020	
"Everyone"	Cheryl Cole featuring Dizzee Rascal	Dylan Mills; Andre Merritt; Wayne Wilkins; Antwoin Collins	Messy Little Raindrops	2010	
"Everything Must Go"	Dizzee Rascal	Dylan Mills; Paul Salva Jr.	Raskit	2017	
"Everywhere"	Dizzee Rascal	Dylan Mills	Showtime	2004	
"Excuse Me Please"	Dizzee Rascal	Dylan Mills	Maths + English	2007	
"Face"	Dizzee Rascal featuring Caramel	Dylan Mills; Caramel	Showtime	2004	
"Fax Machine Anthem (Hell Yes) (Dizzee Rascal Remix)"	Beck featuring Dizzee Rascal	Beck Hansen; Dylan Mills; Michael Simpson; John King	Guerolito	2006	
"Fickle"	Dizzee Rascal	Dylan Mills; Lamont Dozier	Showtime	2004	
"Fix Up, Look Sharp" †	Dizzee Rascal	Dylan Mills; Nick Denton; Billy Squier	Boy in da Corner	2003	
"Flex" †	Dizzee Rascal	Dylan Mills	Maths + English	2007	
"Flyin'"	Dizzee Rascal	Dylan Mills	Showtime	2004	
"Focus'"	Dizzee Rascal	Dylan Mills; Darkness	Raskit	2017	
"Freaky Freaky"	Dizzee Rascal	Dylan Mills; Nick Denton	Tongue n' Cheek	2009	
"G.H.E.T.T.O."	Dizzee Rascal	Dylan Mills	Maths + English (U.S. bonus track)	2008	
"Get By"	Dizzee Rascal featuring Vanya	Dylan Mills; Vanya	Showtime	2004	
"Get Out the Way" †	Dizzee Rascal featuring BackRoad Gee	Dylan Mills; BackRoad Gee; Finn Wigan	Don't Take It Personal	2023	
"Ghost" †	Dizzee Rascal featuring Bugzy Malone (Note: Bugzy Malone is absent from the album version.)	Dylan Mills; Aaron Davies; Dan Farber	Raskit	2018	
"Girls"	Dizzee Rascal featuring Marga Man	Dylan Mills; Carl Morgan	Showtime	2004	
"Give U More"	Dizzee Rascal featuring D Double E	Dylan Mills; Darren Dixon	Showtime (Japanese bonus track) (Note: The song first appeared as a b-side on the CD1 release of the single "Stand Up Tall", and was later included on the 20th anniversary edition of Boy in da Corner.)	2004	
"God Knows"	Dizzee Rascal featuring P Money	Dylan Mills; Paris Moore-Williams	E3 AF	2020	
"Goin' Crazy" †	Dizzee Rascal featuring Robbie Williams	Dylan Mills; Tim Anderson; Jamin Wilcox; Nick Denton	The Fifth	2013	
"Good"	Dizzee Rascal featuring Angel	Dylan Mills; Tony Cottrell; Bryant Walker	The Fifth	2013	
"Graftin'" † (Note: Released as a double A-side single alongside "Off 2 Work".)	Dizzee Rascal	Dylan Mills	Showtime	2005	
"Grime Ain't Dead" †	Silencer featuring Dizzee Rascal	Silencer; Dylan Mills	Non-album single	2022	
"H-Town" #	Dizzee Rascal featuring Bun B and Trae tha Truth	Dylan Mills; Bernard Freeman; Frazier Thompson III; Alain Macklovitch; Oliver Goldstein	The Fifth	2013	
"Hardback (Industry)"	Dizzee Rascal	Dylan Mills; John Fairbanks	Maths + English	2007	
"Heart of a Warrior"	Dizzee Rascal featuring Teddy Sky	Dylan Mills; Geraldo Sandell; Nadir Khayat; Paul Thörnfeldt	The Fifth	2013	
"Heavy"	Chase & Status vs. Dizzee Rascal	Saul Milton; Will Kennard; Dylan Mills	Tongue n' Cheek (Dirtee Deluxe edition) and No More Idols	2010	
"Here 2 China"	Calvin Harris and Dillon Francis featuring Dizzee Rascal	Adam Wiles; Dillon Francis; Dylan Mills	18 Months and The Fifth (Deluxe edition)	2012	
"Here For Now"	Dizzee Rascal featuring Not3s	Dylan Mills; Lukman Odunaike; Finn Wagan; Valentino Salvi; Roddy McAuley	Don't Take It Personal	2024	
"High Road" †	Frisco featuring P Money and Dizzee Rascal	Deshane Cornwall; Paris Moore-Williams; Dylan Mills	Tottenham EP	2022	
"Ho"	Dizzee Rascal	Dylan Mills	Non-album song	2017 (Note: Recorded in 2003)	
"Hold Ya Mouf"	Dizzee Rascal featuring God's Gift	Dylan Mills; Jerome Dow	Boy in da Corner	2003	
"Holiday" †	Dizzee Rascal featuring Chrome	Dylan Mills; Tyrone Paul; Adam Wiles; Nick Denton	Tongue n' Cheek	2009	
"How Did I Get So Calm" †	Dizzee Rascal	Dylan Mills	Don't Take It Personal	2023	
"How Does It Feel"	Dizzee Rascal	Dylan Mills	Don't Take It Personal	2024	
"How Love Begins" †	DJ Fresh and High Contrast featuring Dizzee Rascal	Daniel Stein; Lincoln Barrett; Dylan Mills; Clare Maguire	Non-album single	2016	
"Hype" †	Dizzee Rascal and Calvin Harris	Dylan Mills; Adam Wiles	Non-album single	2016	
"Hype Talk"	Dizzee Rascal	Dylan Mills	Showtime	2004	
"I Ain't Even Gonna Lie"	Dizzee Rascal	Dylan Mills; The HeavyTrackerz; Teddy Samba; Wilfred Kouassi	Raskit	2017	
"I Don't Need a Reason" #	Dizzee Rascal	Dylan Mills; Nick Marsh; Jean Kouame; Ryan Buendia; Michael McHenry	The Fifth	2013	
"I Luv U" †	Dizzee Rascal	Dylan Mills	Boy in da Corner	2003	
"I'm Sprung (U.K. Remix)"	T-Pain featuring Dizzee Rascal	Faheem Najm; Dylan Mills	Rappa Ternt Sanga (Australian edition)	2006	
"Ice Rink"	Dizzee Rascal	Dylan Mills; Richard Cowie Jr.	Tunnel Vision Volume 3	2006	
"Ignite" †	Chip featuring Dizzee Rascal and JME	Jahmaal Fyffe; Dylan Mills; Jamie Adenuga; The FaNaTiX	Snakes & Ladders	2020	
"Imagine"	Dizzee Rascal	Dylan Mills	Showtime	2004	
"Is This Real?"	Dizzee Rascal	Dylan Mills	"Dream"	2004	
"Jerk and Jollof"	Dizzee Rascal	Dylan Mills; Teddy Music	Don't Take It Personal	2024	
"Jezebel"	Dizzee Rascal	Dylan Mills	Boy in da Corner	2003	
"Jus' a Rascal" †	Dizzee Rascal	Dylan Mills; Tesmond Rowe; Vanguard Vaerdon	Boy in da Corner	2003	
"Justin Bieber" †	Smoke Boys featuring Dizzee Rascal	Smoke Boys; Dylan Mills; MKThePlug	All The Smoke	2020	
"Keep That Same Energy"	Dizzee Rascal featuring BackRoad Gee and P Money	Dylan Mills; BackRoad Gee; Paris Moore-Williams	Don't Take It Personal	2024	
"Klappin"	Smurfie Syco featuring Dizzee Rascal	Teriy Keys; Dylan Mills	SMURFIESYCO.COM	2009	
"Knock, Knock"	Dizzee Rascal	Dylan Mills	Showtime	2004	
"Kryme"	Dizzee Rascal featuring Redrum and Sharky Major	Dylan Mills; Redrum; Jerome Palmer	Boy in da Corner (20th anniversary edition)	2023 (Note: Recorded in 2000)	
"L.L.L.L. (Love Life Live Large)" †	Dizzee Rascal featuring Chip	Dylan Mills; Jahmaal Fyffe	E3 AF	2020	
"Learn"	Dizzee Rascal	Dylan Mills; Tesmond Rowe; Vanguard Vaerdon	Showtime	2004	
"Lemon"	Dizzee Rascal featuring Jammer and Newham Generals	Dylan Mills; Jahmek Power; Darren Dixon; Daniel Carnegie	Non-album song	2007	
"Leisure"	Dizzee Rascal	Dylan Mills; Nick Denton; Daniel Carnegie	Tongue n' Cheek	2009	
"Let's Push Things Forward (The Streets Remix)"	The Streets featuring Roll Deep and Dizzee Rascal	Mike Skinner; Dylan Mills; Ibrahim Ali; Marc Veira; Ryan Williams; Richard Cowie	All Got Our Runnins (Note: The remix was originally included as a b-side on the CD release of The Streets' 2002 single "Weak Become Heroes".)	2002	
"Life Keeps Moving On"	Dizzee Rascal featuring Pop Wansel	Dylan Mills; Tim Anderson; Jamin Wilcox	The Fifth	2013	
"Like Me"	Dizzee Rascal	Dylan Mills; Trevor James	"Sirens"	2007	
"Live O"	Dizzee Rascal	Dylan Mills	Boy in da Corner	2003	
"Loca" †	Shakira featuring Dizzee Rascal	Shakira Ripoll; Dylan Mills; Edward Bello; Armando Pérez	Sale el Sol (bonus track)	2010	
"London Boy"	Dizzee Rascal featuring Frisco	Dylan Mills; Deshane Cornwall	Don't Take It Personal	2024	
"Love Ain't Just a Word" #	Rudimental featuring Anne-Marie and Dizzee Rascal	Amir Izadkhah; Piers Aggett; Kesi Dryden; Leon Rolle; Anne-Marie Nicholson; Dylan Mills; Jess Jackson; Thomas Jules	We the Generation	2015	
"Love This Town" †	Dizzee Rascal featuring Teddy Sky	Dylan Mills; Geraldo Sandell; Nadir Khayat; Paul Thörnfeldt; Eric Sanicola	The Fifth	2013	
"Lucky Star" †	Basement Jaxx featuring Dizzee Rascal	Felix Buxton; Simon Ratcliffe; Dylan Mills	Kish Kash	2003	
"Make It Last"	Dizzee Rascal	Dylan Mills; Jamil Pierre	Raskit	2017	
"Man of the Hour"	Dizzee Rascal	Dylan Mills; Ronald LaTour Jr.	Raskit	2017	
"Marks Outta Ten"	Dizzee Rascal	Dylan Mills	Tongue n' Cheek (Dirtee Deluxe edition)	2010	
"Money, Money"	Dizzee Rascal	Dylan Mills; Nick Denton	Tongue n' Cheek	2009	
"Money Right" †	Dizzee Rascal featuring Skepta	Dylan Mills; Joseph Adenuga Jr. David Sylvian	Don't Gas Me	2018	
"Mosh Pit"	Tinie Tempah featuring Dizzee Rascal and Ty Dolla Sign	Patrick Okogwu; Dylan Mills; Tyrone Griffins Jr. Ricardo Thomas; Will Kennard; Saul Milton	Demonstration	2013	
"Murkle Man (Remix)"	Jammer featuring Dizzee Rascal and D Double E	Jahmek Power; Dylan Mills; Darren Dixon; Richard Cowie Jr.	Are You Dumb? Vol. 1	2005	
"My Life"	Dizzee Rascal featuring Newham Generals	Dylan Mills; Darren Dixon; Daniel Carnegie	"Pussyole (Old Skool)"	2007	
"Nuffin Long"	Dizzee Rascal	Dylan Mills	Tongue n' Cheek (Dirtee Deluxe edition)	2010	
"Nutcrackerz" †	Dizzee Rascal featuring Giggs	Dylan Mills; Nathaniel Thompson; Wilfred Kouassi; Rasi Wellington-Forbes; Teddy Sambas	Non-album single	2015	
"Off 2 Work" † (Note: Released as a double A-side single alongside "Graftin'".)	Dizzee Rascal	Dylan Mills	Non-album single	2005	
"On One"	Bliss n Eso featuring Dizzee Rascal	Jonathan Notley; Max Mackinnon; Tarik Ejjamai; Dylan Mills	The Sun	2021	
"One Eye Open"	Kwengface featuring Dizzee Rascal	Ninian Agyemang; Dylan Mills; ProdByMG	YPB: The Archive	2022	
"Only One King" †	Dizzee Rascal	Dylan Mills	Non-album single	2020	
"Pagans"	Dizzee Rascal	Dylan Mills; Daniel Carnegeie	Pagans	2014	
"Paranoid"	Dizzee Rascal	Dylan Mills; Nick Denton; Daniel Carnegie	Maths + English	2007	
"Patterning Vibez"	Dizzee Rascal featuring Afronaut Zu	Dylan Mills; Adeola Badejo	Don't Gas Me	2018	
"Pepper"	Newham Generals featuring Dizzee Rascal	Darren Dixon; Daniel Carnegie; Dylan Mills	Generally Speaking	2009	
"POV"	Dizzee Rascal	Dylan Mills	Don't Take It Personal	2024	
"Pussyole (Old Skool)" †	Dizzee Rascal	Dylan Mills; Nick Denton	Maths + English	2007	
"Quality"	Dizzee Rascal	Dylan Mills; Gavin Cheung	Don't Gas Me	2018	
"Ready 4 War"	Dizzee Rascal featuring Armour, Stormin and Sharky Major	Dylan Mills; Armour; Shaun Lewis; Jerome Palmer	Boy in da Corner (20th anniversary edition)	2023 (Note: Likely recorded in 2000 or 2001)	
"Respect Me"	Dizzee Rascal	Dylan Mills	Showtime	2004	
"Revvin'"	Ocean Wisdom featuring Dizzee Rascal	Ocean Wisdom; Dylan Mills	Wizville	2018	
"Riot" †	Silque featuring Dizzee Rascal	Silque; Dylan Mills	Non-album single	2020	
"Road Rage"	Dizzee Rascal featuring Chrome	Dylan Mills; Tyrone Paul; Aaron LaCrate; Debonair Samir	Tongue n' Cheek	2009	
"Roll Wit Me"	Dizzee Rascal featuring Predz UK	Dylan Mills; Kevin Muyulu; Rodney Hwingwiri	Don't Take It Personal	2024	
"Round We Go"	Dizzee Rascal	Dylan Mills; Chubby Dread	Boy in da Corner	2003	
"Scream" †	Dizzee Rascal featuring Pepper	Dylan Mills; Pepper Rose; Nick Denton; Musical D Teriy Keys	Non-album single	2012	
"Seems 2 Be"	Dizzee Rascal	Dylan Mills	Boy in da Corner	2003	
"She Knows What She Wants"	Dizzee Rascal	Dylan Mills; Ronald LaTour Jr.	Raskit	2017	
"Shout" †	Shout for England featuring Dizzee Rascal and James Corden	Dylan Mills; Owen Ryan; Ian Stanley; William Withers Jr. Edward Riley; Richard Vick; William Stewart; Chauncey Hannibal; Lynise Walters; Ray Hedges; Nigel Butler; Blair Dreelan; Nick Denton	Charity single	2010	
"Showtime"	Dizzee Rascal	Dylan Mills	Showtime	2004	
"Smoke" †	Big Tobz featuring Dizzee Rascal	Oluwatobiloba Aiyeola; Dylan Mills	Non-album single	2020	
"Sick a Dis"	Dizzee Rascal	Dylan Mills; Ian Greenidge	Raskit	2017	
"Sirens" †	Dizzee Rascal	Dylan Mills; Nick Denton; Reginald Arvizu; Jonathan Davis; James Shaffer; David Silveria; Brian Welch	Maths + English	2007	
"Sittin' Here"	Dizzee Rascal	Dylan Mills	Boy in da Corner	2003	
"Slow Your Roll"	Dizzee Rascal	Dylan Mills; Dan Farber	Raskit	2017	
"Something Really Bad" †	Dizzee Rascal featuring will.i.am	Dylan Mills; William Adams; Jean Kouame; Jonas Jeberg	The Fifth	2013	
"Space" †	Dizzee Rascal	Dylan Mills; Paul Salva Jr.	Raskit	2017	
"Spend Some Money"	Dizzee Rascal featuring Tinie Tempah	Dylan Mills; Patrick Okogwu; Jean Kouame; Ryan Buendia; Michael McHenry	The Fifth	2013	
"Spin Ya"	Dizzee Rascal featuring C Cane and P Money	Dylan Mills; Candice Anwasi; Paris Moore-Williams	Don't Gas Me	2018	
"Stand Up Tall" †	Dizzee Rascal	Dylan Mills; Daryl Nurse; Nick Denton	Showtime	2004	
"Stay In Your Lane"	Dizzee Rascal	Dylan Mills; Matt Johnson; Rob Harris	Don't Take It Personal	2024	
"Stepped In'"	LD featuring Dizzee Rascal	Cassiel Wuta-Ofei; Dylan Mills; Ellis Taylor	The Masked One	2018	
"Still Sittin' Here" †	Fekky and Dizzee Rascal	Fekky Johnson; Dylan Mills; Splurgeboys	Non-album single	2014	
"Still The Same"	More Fire Crew featuring Dizzee Rascal	Maxwell Ansah; Darren Hector; Osmond Bowes; Dylan Mills; Casim Scott	More Fire Crew C.V.	2003	
"Stop Dat"	Dizzee Rascal	Dylan Mills	Boy in da Corner	2003	
"Street Fighter"	Dizzee Rascal	Dylan Mills	Boy in da Corner (20th anniversary edition)	2023 (Note: Recorded in 2002)	
"Stuttering"	P Money and Silencer featuring Chip, Dizzee Rascal and D Double E	Paris Moore-Williams; Silencer; Jahmaal Fyffe; Dylan Mills; Darren Dixon; Teddy Music	Untraditional	2021	
"Sugar and Spice" †	Dizzee Rascal featuring iLL BLU	Dylan Mills; James Grant; Darius Ellington-Forde	Don't Take It Personal	2023	
"Suk My Dick"	Dizzee Rascal	Dylan Mills; Nick Denton	Maths + English	2007	
"Superman"	Dizzee Rascal	Dylan Mills; Nick Marsh; Jean Kouame; Ryan Buendia; Michael McHenry	The Fifth	2013	
"Swerve and Pivot"	Dizzee Rascal featuring D Double E	Dylan Mills; Darren Dixon; Francesco Moliterno	Don't Take It Personal	2024	
"Switch and Explode"	Dizzee Rascal	Dylan Mills	Don't Take It Personal	2024	
"Tell Me About It"	Dizzee Rascal	Dylan Mills; Matt Johnson	Don't Take It Personal	2024	
"Temptation"	Dizzee Rascal featuring Alex Turner	Dylan Mills; Alexander Turner; Nick Denton; Daniel Carnegie	Maths + English	2007	
"Temptation Greets You Like Your Naughty Friend"	Arctic Monkeys featuring Dizzee Rascal	Alexander Turner; Jamie Cook; Nick O'Malley; Matthew Helders; Dylan Mills	"Brianstorm"	2007	
"That's Too Much"	Dizzee Rascal featuring Frisco and D Double E	Dylan Mills; Deshane Cornwall; Darren Dixon	E3 AF	2020	
"The Power" †	DJ Fresh featuring Dizzee Rascal	Daniel Stein; Dylan Mills; Jason Pebworth; George Astasio; Jon Shave	Nextlevelism	2012	
"The Other Side"	Dizzee Rascal	Dylan Mills; Ronald LaTour Jr. Ramon Ibanga Jr.	Raskit	2017	
"Toe Jam" †	The Brighton Port Authority featuring David Byrne and Dizzee Rascal	David Byrne; Dylan Mills; Norman Cook; Simon Thornton	I Think We're Gonna Need a Bigger Boat	2008	
"Trapped"	Dizzee Rascal	Dylan Mills	"Dream"	2004	
"Turn It Up (Remix)"	Chamillionaire featuring Dizzee Rascal	Hakeem Seriki; Dylan Mills	"Grown and Sexy"	2006	
"Two Types of Bitches"	UGK featuring Dizzee Rascal and Pimpin' Ken	Chad Butler; Bernard Freeman; Dylan Mills; Kenneth Ivy; Ollie Moore; Joseph Johnson; Johnny Bristol; Gladys Knight; Merald Knight, Jr.	Underground Kingz	2007	
"U Can't Tell Me Nuffin'"	Dizzee Rascal	Dylan Mills; Daniel Carnegie	Maths + English	2007	
"U Were Always"	Wiley, Dizzee Rascal and Tinchy Stryder	Richard Cowie Jr. Dylan Mills; Kwasi Danquah III	Street Anthems	2009 (Note: Recorded in 2002)	
"Vexed"	Dizzee Rascal	Dylan Mills	Boy in da Corner (U.S. bonus track)	2004	
"Violence" †	Newham Generals featuring G-Man and Dizzee Rascal	Darren Dixon; Daniel Carnegie; G-Man; Dylan Mills	Generally Speaking	2009	
"Wanna Be"	Dizzee Rascal featuring Lily Allen	Dylan Mills; Lily Allen; Darren Lewis; Iyiola Babalola	Maths + English	2007	
"Watch Your Back"	Dizzee Rascal	Dylan Mills; Tim Anderson	The Fifth (Deluxe edition)	2013	
"Way I Am"	Dizzee Rascal	Dylan Mills; Winston Howard; Kurtis McKenzie; Jon Mills	Raskit	2017	
"We Aint Havin It"	Dizzee Rascal featuring Wiley	Dylan Mills; Richard Cowie Jr.	Boy in da Corner (20th anniversary edition)	2023 (Note: Likely recorded in 2002 or 2003)	
"We Don't Play Around"	Dizzee Rascal featuring Jessie J	Dylan Mills; Jesicca Cornish; Nadir Khayat; Geraldo Sandell; Paul Thörnfeldt	The Fifth	2013	
"What You Know About That" †	Dizzee Rascal featuring JME and D Double E	Dylan Mills; Jamie Adenuga; Darren Dixon; Francesco Moliterno	Don't Take It Personal	2024	
"When It Comes To You" †	Adam F and Cory Enemy featuring Dizzee Rascal and Margot	Adam Fenton; Cory Nitta; Dylan Mills; Margot	Non-album single	2014	
"Where's da G's"	Dizzee Rascal featuring UGK	Dylan Mills; Chad Butler; Bernard Freeman	Maths + English	2007	
"Wild" †	Jessie J featuring Big Sean and Dizzee Rascal	Jesicca Cornish; Sean Anderson; Dylan Mills; Joshua Coleman; Claude Kelly	Alive	2013	
"Win"	Dizzee Rascal featuring Breeze	Dylan Mills; Ibrahim Ali	Boy in da Corner (20th anniversary edition)	2023 (Note: Likely recorded in 2002 or 2003)	
"World Outside"	Dizzee Rascal	Dylan Mills; Nick Denton	Maths + English	2007	
"Wot U Gonna Do?" †	Dizzee Rascal	Dylan Mills; Valentino Khan	Raskit	2017	
"Wot U On?"	Dizzee Rascal	Dylan Mills	Boy in da Corner	2003	
"You Can Have Dat"	Dizzee Rascal	Dylan Mills; Valentino Salvi	Don't Take It Personal	2024	
"You Don't Know"	Dizzee Rascal	Dylan Mills; Nick Annand	E3 AF	2020	
"You Got The Dirtee Love" †	Florence + The Machine and Dizzee Rascal	Dylan Mills; John Bellamy; Anthony Stephens; Arnecia Michelle Harris; Nick Denton	Tongue n' Cheek (Dirtee Deluxe edition) and Between Two Lungs	2010	
"Zone"	Orelsan featuring Nekfeu and Dizzee Rascal	Aurélien Cotentin; Ken Samaras; Dylan Mills; Matthieu Carpentier	La fête est finie	2017	

== See also ==
- Dizzee Rascal discography
