= Dizzee Rascal discography =

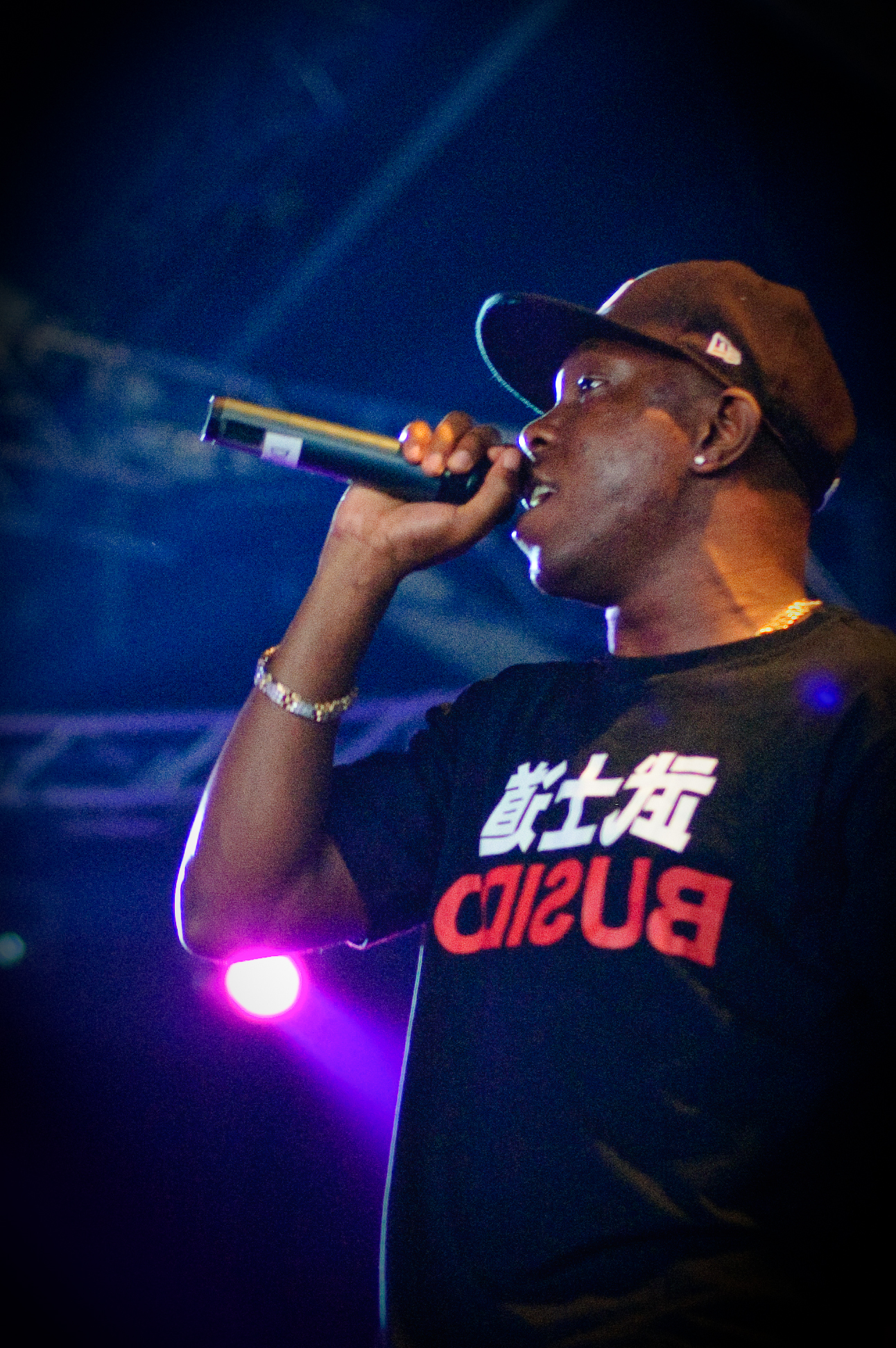
- Dizzee Rascal performing at the 2009 Ilosaarirock in Joensuu, Finland
- Studio albums: 9
- Extended plays: 1
- Live albums: 1
- Singles: 51
- Mixtapes: 2

English rapper Dizzee Rascal has released nine studio albums, one live album, one extended play, 35 singles (including 16 singles as a featured artist), two charity releases, two promotional singles and two mixtapes.

Dizzee Rascal released his debut studio album, Boy in da Corner, on 21 July 2003, in the United Kingdom, where it peaked at number twenty-three; having been certified as gold by the British Phonographic Industry (BPI). The album was preceded by the rapper's debut single, "I Luv U", which peaked at number twenty-nine on the UK Singles Chart. The singles "Fix Up, Look Sharp" and "Jus' a Rascal" were also released from the album in 2003, reaching peaks of number seventeen and thirty, respectively, in the UK. The rapper's second studio album, Showtime was released on 6 September 2004, where it debuted at number eight in the UK and number sixty-five in Ireland. The album's lead single, "Stand Up Tall" was released on 23 August 2004, marking Dizzee Rascal's first top-ten single when it peaked at number ten. The album also saw the release of "Dream" and the double A-side "Off 2 Work"/"Graftin'", which reached peaks of number fourteen and number forty-four in the UK, respectively.

A third studio album, Maths + English, was released on 4 June 2007, where it debuted at number seven in the UK and number fifty-seven in Ireland. The album saw the release of three singles, "Sirens", "Pussyole (Old Skool)" and "Flex", which reached peaks of number twenty, twenty-two and twenty-three, respectively, in the UK. On 22 June 2008, Dizzee Rascal released "Dance wiv Me", a collaboration with singer Chrome and songwriter/producer Calvin Harris. The track saw commercial success for the rapper when it debuted at number-one in the UK, also reaching number five in Ireland and number thirteen in Australia. The single spent four consecutive weeks at the top of the UK chart and was certified platinum the following year for surpassing sales of 600,000 copies. The rapper continued the line of success when follow-up singles "Bonkers", produced by Armand van Helden, and "Holiday", featuring Chrome, both topped the UK chart. The fourth studio album, Tongue N' Cheek, was released on 21 September 2009, peaking at number three in the UK and number twenty in Ireland. It was succeeded by the release of a fourth single, "Dirtee Cash", which gave the rapper a fourth consecutive top-ten hit when it peaked at number ten.

At the 2010 BRIT Awards, Dizzee collaborated with British indie rock band Florence and the Machine, performing ""You Got the Dirtee Love"", a mash-up of "You've Got the Love" and "Dirtee Cash". The collaboration was then released as a digital download, peaking at number two in the United Kingdom and number twenty-four in Ireland. The album, Tongue N' Cheek, was re-issued in June 2010 to include the collaboration and celebrate the platinum certification of the album itself. The 'Dirtee Deluxe' edition of the album included the single "Dirtee Disco", which gave the rapper a fourth solo number-one single when it topped the chart in May 2010.

The rapper returned to the charts in 2012 following the release of "Scream", which featured Must Be the Music finalist Pepper (of Pepper & Piano). It became the artist's nineteenth top forty hit in the United Kingdom when it debuted at number twenty-two in August 2012.

Dizzee Rascal has also appeared as a featured artist on several occasions, the first of which was "Lucky Star" (2003), a collaboration with Basement Jaxx that peaked at number twenty-three in the UK. The rapper has also collaborated with The Brighton Port Authority on the track "Toe Jam" (2008) and with D Double E on the track "Bluku! Bluku!" (2011). Most notably is Dizzee Rascal's collaboration with Colombian singer Shakira, "Loca". The track proved an international hit, topping charts worldwide, including Poland, Portugal and Spain; also peaking at number thirty-two on the Billboard Hot 100. In 2010, the rapper collaborated with British producer DJ Fresh on the track "The Power"—which peaked at number six in the United Kingdom. The rapper has also been involved in two charity releases: firstly as Band Aid 20 in 2004 on the track "Do They Know It's Christmas" and secondly as part of Shout for England in 2010 on the track "Shout" with James Corden, both peaking at number one in the UK and Ireland.

== Albums ==
=== Studio albums ===
List of studio albums, with selected chart positions and certifications
Title	Details	Peak chart positions										Certifications
Title	Details	UK	AUS	BEL (FL)	BEL (WA)	IRE	NL Alt.	NZ	SCO	SWI	US Heat	Certifications
Boy in da Corner	Released: 21 July 2003; Label: XL; Formats: CD, LP, digital download	23	—	—	—	—	9	—	44	—	16	BPI: Platinum
Showtime	Released: 6 September 2004; Label: XL; Formats: CD, LP, digital download	8	—	—	—	65	23	—	28	—	—	BPI: Gold
Maths + English	Released: 4 June 2007; Label: XL; Formats: CD, LP, digital download	7	120	66	—	57	27	—	20	—	—	BPI: Gold
Tongue n' Cheek	Released: 21 September 2009; Label: Dirtee Stank, Island; Formats: CD, LP, digital download	3	18	24	—	20	—	9	4	—	—	BPI: 2x Platinum
The Fifth	Released: 30 September 2013; Label: Dirtee Stank, Island; Formats: CD, digital download	10	33	162	195	—	—	40	18	48	—	
Raskit	Released: 21 July 2017; Label: Dirtee Stank, Island; Formats: CD, LP, digital download, streaming	10	—	—	—	—	—	—	44	—	—	
E3 AF	Released: 30 October 2020; Label: Dirtee Stank, Island; Formats: CD, LP, digital download, streaming	13	—	—	—	—	—	—	26	—	—	
Don't Take It Personal	Released: 9 February 2024; Label: Big Dirtee Records; Formats: CD, LP, digital download, streaming	27	—	—	—	—	—	—	5	—	—	
We Want Bass	Released: 4 September 2026; Label: Big Dirtee Records; Formats: CD, LP, digital download, streaming	—	—	—	—	—	—	—	—	—	—	
"—" denotes a recording that did not chart or was not released in that territory.

=== Live albums ===
Title	Details
Sidewinder Live	Released: 2002; Recorded: Live on Rinse FM with DJ Slimzee; Formats: CD, Cassette

=== Mixtapes ===
Title	Details
DirteeTV.com: The Mixtape (Mixed by DJ MK)	Released: 1 January 2012; Label: Self-released; Format: Digital download
DirteeTV.com: The Mixtape EP, Vol. 2	Released: 1 January 2013; Label: Universal-Island Records Ltd.; Format: Digital download

== Extended plays ==
Title	Details
Don't Gas Me	Released: 14 September 2018; Label: Dirtee Stank, Island; Format: Streaming, digital download
I Invented Grime	Released: 12 December 2024; Label: Big Dirtee Records; Format: Streaming, digital download

== Singles ==
=== As lead artist ===
List of singles, with selected chart positions
Title	Year	Peak chart positions										Certifications	Album
Title	Year	UK	AUS	AUT	BEL (FL)	FIN	GER	IRE	NL	NZ	SWI	Certifications	Album
"I Luv U"	2003	29	—	—	—	—	—	—	—	—	—		Boy in da Corner
"Fix Up, Look Sharp"	2003	17	—	—	—	—	—	—	—	—	—	BPI: Gold	Boy in da Corner
"Jus' a Rascal"	2003	30	—	—	—	—	—	—	—	—	—		Boy in da Corner
"Stand Up Tall"	2004	10	—	—	—	—	—	—	—	—	—		Showtime
"Dream"	2004	14	—	—	—	—	—	—	—	—	—		Showtime
"Off 2 Work" / "Graftin'"	2005	44	—	—	—	—	—	—	—	—	—		Showtime
"Sirens"	2007	20	—	—	—	—	—	—	—	—	—		Maths + English
"Pussyole (Old Skool)"	2007	22	—	—	—	—	—	—	—	—	—		Maths + English
"Flex"	2007	23	—	—	—	—	—	—	—	—	—		Maths + English
"Dance wiv Me" (featuring Calvin Harris and Chrome)	2008	1	13	—	40	—	48	5	—	—	—	BPI: 3× Platinum; ARIA: Platinum; RMNZ: 3× Platinum	Tongue n' Cheek
"Bonkers" (with Armand Van Helden)	2009	1	13	26	6	18	58	3	63	12	88	BPI: 2× Platinum; ARIA: 3× Platinum; RMNZ: 3× Platinum	Tongue n' Cheek
"Holiday" (featuring Chrome)	2009	1	30	—	20	—	78	5	68	6	—	BPI: 2× Platinum; ARIA: Gold; RMNZ: Platinum	Tongue n' Cheek
"Dirtee Cash"	2009	10	—	—	— (Note: "Dirtee Cash" did not enter the Ultratop 50, but peaked at number seven on the Flemish Ultratip chart.)	—	—	—	—	—	—	BPI: Silver	Tongue n' Cheek
"You Got the Dirtee Love" (with Florence and the Machine)	2010	2	27	—	—	—	—	24	—	—	—	BPI: Platinum	Tongue n' Cheek
"Dirtee Disco"	2010	1	68	—	—	—	—	21	—	—	—	BPI: Silver	Tongue n' Cheek
"Scream" (featuring Pepper)	2012	22	—	—	—	—	—	—	—	—	—		Non-album single
"Goin' Crazy" (featuring Robbie Williams)	2013	5	—	57	— (Note: "Goin' Crazy" did not enter the Ultratop 50, but peaked at number two on the Flemish Ultratip chart.)	—	32	25	—	—	—		The Fifth
"Something Really Bad" (featuring will.i.am)	2013	10	—	94	— (Note: "Something Really Bad" did not enter the Ultratop 50, but peaked at number 54 on the Flemish Ultratip chart.)	—	65	86	—	—	—		The Fifth
"Love This Town" (featuring Teddy Sky)	2013	35	—	—	—	—	—	—	—	—	—		The Fifth
"Still Sittin' Here" (with Fekky)	2014	47	—	—	—	—	—	—	—	—	—		Non-album singles
"Hype" (with Calvin Harris)	2016	34	—	—	—	—	—	71	—	— (Note: "Hype" did not enter the New Zealand Singles Chart, but peaked at number two on the New Zealand Heatseekers Singles Chart.)	—	BPI: Silver; RMNZ: Gold	Non-album singles
"Space"	2017	—	—	—	—	—	—	—	—	—	—		Raskit
"Money Right" (featuring Skepta)	2018	68	—	—	—	—	—	—	—	—	—		Don't Gas Me
"L.L.L.L. (Love Life Live Large)" (featuring Chip)	2020	—	—	—	—	—	—	—	—	—	—		E3 AF
"Act Like You Know" (featuring Smoke Boys)	2020	—	—	—	—	—	—	—	—	—	—		E3 AF
"Body Loose"	2020	—	—	—	—	—	—	—	—	—	—		E3 AF
"Sugar and Spice" (featuring iLL BLU)	2023	—	—	—	—	—	—	—	—	—	—		Don't Take It Personal
"Get Out the Way" (featuring BackRoad Gee)	2023	—	—	—	—	—	—	—	—	—	—		Don't Take It Personal
"How Did I Get So Calm"	2023	—	—	—	—	—	—	—	—	—	—		Don't Take It Personal
"What You Know About That" (featuring Jme and D Double E)	2024	—	—	—	—	—	—	—	—	—	—		Don't Take It Personal
"Gather Around (Good Times)" (featuring Bou, Liam Bailey and Shapes	2025	—	—	—	—	—	—	—	—	—	—		Non-album single
"C U Dance"	2026	—	—	—	—	—	—	—	—	—	—		We Want Bass
"All Night"	2026	—	—	—	—	—	—	—	—	—	—		We Want Bass
"So Hot"	2026	—	—	—	—	—	—	—	—	—	—		We Want Bass
"What U Need"	2026	—	—	—	—	—	—	—	—	—	—		We Want Bass
"—" denotes a recording that did not chart or was not released in that territory.

=== As featured artist ===
List of singles, with selected chart positions
Title	Year	Peak chart positions									Certifications	Album
Title	Year	UK	AUS	AUT	BEL (FL)	FIN	GER	IRE	NL	US	Certifications	Album
"Lucky Star" (Basement Jaxx featuring Dizzee Rascal)	2003	23	76	—	—	—	—	—	—	—		Kish Kash
"Toe Jam" (The Brighton Port Authority featuring David Byrne and Dizzee Rascal)	2008	198	—	—	— (Note: "Toe Jam" did not enter the Ultratop 50, but peaked at number eight on the Flemish Ultratip chart.)	—	—	—	—	—		I Think We're Gonna; Need a Bigger Boat
"Loca" (Shakira featuring Dizzee Rascal)	2010	—	—	2	3	11	6	44	55	32	IFPI AUT: Gold; BEA: Gold; BVMI: Gold	
"Violence" (Newham Generals featuring G-Man and Dizzee Rascal)	2010	—	—	—	—	—	—	—	—	—		Generally Speaking
"Bluku! Bluku!" (D Double E featuring Dizzee Rascal)	2011	—	—	—	—	—	—	—	—	—		Non-album single
"The Power" (DJ Fresh featuring Dizzee Rascal)	2012	6	—	—	—	—	—	25	—	—		Nextlevelism
"Wild" (Jessie J featuring Big Sean and Dizzee Rascal)	2013	5	6	34	— (Note: "Wild" did not enter the Ultratop 50, but peaked at number five on the Flemish Ultratip chart.)	—	12	9	63	104	BPI: Gold; ARIA: 2× Platinum; IFPI DEN: Gold	Alive
"When It Comes to You" (Adam F and Cory Enemy featuring Dizzee Rascal and Margot)	2014	—	—	—	—	—	—	—	—	—		Non-album singles
"How Love Begins" (DJ Fresh and High Contrast featuring Dizzee Rascal)	2016	53	—	—	—	—	—	—	—	—		Non-album singles
"Revvin'" (Ocean Wisdom featuring Dizzee Rascal)	2018	—	—	—	—	—	—	—	—	—	BPI: Silver	Wizville
"Blessed" (Ocean Wisdom featuring Dizzee Rascal)	2019	—	—	—	—	—	—	—	—	—		Big Talk, Vol. 1
"Back It" (Yizzy featuring Dizzee Rascal)	2019	—	—	—	—	—	—	—	—	—		Non-album singles
"Smoke" (Big Tobz featuring Dizzee Rascal)	2020	—	—	—	—	—	—	—	—	—		Non-album singles
"Riot" (Silque featuring Dizzee Rascal)	2020	—	—	—	—	—	—	—	—	—		Non-album singles
"On One" (Bliss n Eso featuring Dizzee Rascal)	2021	—	—	—	—	—	—	—	—	—		The Sun
"Grime Ain't Dead" (Silencer featuring Dizzee Rascal)	2022	—	—	—	—	—	—	—	—	—		Non-album single
"High Road" (Frisco featuring P Money and Dizzee Rascal)	2022	—	—	—	—	—	—	—	—	—		Tottenham EP
"—" denotes a recording that did not chart or was not released in that territory.

=== Charity releases ===
List of singles, with selected chart positions
Title	Year	Peak chart positions			Album
Title	Year	UK	IRE	NZ	Album
"Do They Know It's Christmas?" (as part of Band Aid 20)	2004	1	1	1	Non-album singles
"Shout" (as Shout for England with James Corden)	2010	1	38	—	Non-album singles
"—" denotes a recording that did not chart or was not released in that territory.

=== Promotional singles ===
List of promotional singles, with selected chart positions
Title	Year	Peak chart positions			Certifications	Album
Title	Year	UK	AUS	IRE	Certifications	Album
"Bassline Junkie"	2013	10	61	75	BPI: Platinum; Platinum: Gold	Dirtee TV.com – The Mixtape EP, Vol.2
"H Town" (featuring Bun B and Trae tha Truth)	2013	—	—	—		The Fifth
"I Don't Need a Reason"	2013	69	96	—		The Fifth
"—" denotes a recording that did not chart or was not released in that territory.

== Other charted songs ==
List of non-single songs, with selected chart positions
Title	Year	Peak chart positions	Album
Title	Year	UK	Album
"Temptation Greets You Like Your Naughty Friend" (Arctic Monkeys featuring Dizzee Rascal)	2007	77	Brianstorm

== Guest appearances ==
List of non-single songs with guest appearances by Dizzee Rascal
Title	Year	Album
"I'm Sprung (U.K. Remix)" (T-Pain featuring Dizzee Rascal)	2005	Rappa Ternt Sanga
"Two Types of Bitches" (UGK featuring Dizzee Rascal + Pimpin' Ken)	2007	Underground Kingz
"Klappin" (Smurfie Syco featuring Dizzee Rascal)	2009	SMURFIESYCO.COM (album)
"Everyone" (Cheryl Cole featuring Dizzee Rascal)	2010	Messy Little Raindrops
"Heavy" (Chase & Status featuring Dizzee Rascal)	2011	No More Idols
"Still the Same" (Lethal Bizzle featuring Dizzee Rascal)	2011	Best of Bizzle
"Here 2 China" (Calvin Harris featuring Dillon Francis & Dizzee Rascal)	2012	18 Months
"Love Ain't Just a Word" (Rudimental featuring Anne-Marie and Dizzee Rascal)	2015	We the Generation
"Zone" (Orelsan featuring Nekfeu and Dizzee Rascal)	2017	La fête est finie

== In video games ==
In PlayStation Home, the PlayStation 3's online community-based service, there was an event dedicated for Dizzee Rascal in the VIP Room of the SingStar themed game space that ran from 24 September 2009 to 9 October 2009. Dizzee performed for the PS Home/SingStar community and answered questions for an hour after the performance. There were also limited time items at this space like a Dizzee Mask. This was available to the European and North American versions of PlayStation Home, however, Dizzee only appeared in the European version answering questions. There is also a SongPack on the SingStore for SingStar that include six of Dizzee's tracks.

Dizzee's track "Stand Up Tall" is featured in the 2005 video game FIFA Street.

"Fix Up, Look Sharp" is featured in the 2009 video game DJ Hero and in the United Kingdom version of the 2010 video game Def Jam Rapstar.

"Bonkers" is featured in the 2009 video game Need for Speed: Nitro, the 2010 video game DJ Hero 2 and the 2012 video game Need For Speed: Most Wanted.

"Heart of a Warrior" is featured in the 2014 game WWE 2K15
