= Not.fay =

not.fay
- Born: 9 May 1995
- Origin: Switzerland
- Genres: R&B
- Years active: 2017–present
- Labels: Empire Distribution
- Website: www.itsnotfay.com

Not.fay (born Nour Alessandra Fahmy) is a Swiss-Egyptian R&B artist. In 2017, not.fay released her debut EP Purple. Since 2017, she has been releasing singles regularly, unattached to a project. Not.fay has opened for Yizzy and was planned to open for Bhad Bhabie in Jordan before the concert was cancelled.

== Personal life ==
Not.fay was born in Switzerland to an Egyptian father and a Swiss mother. During her adolescence, not.fay lived in Jordan and then moved to the UK. She is currently based in Oakland, California.

== Career ==
In 2018, not.fay placed number 27 in the UK Music Week charts. In 2019, she was selected by public vote to open for popular UK music festival called Strawberries & Creem. She was also set to open for Bhad Bhabie's concert in Jordan before the show itself was cancelled because Bhad Bhabie had made controversial comments.

== Additional links ==
- not.fay on Instagram
- not.fay on Twitter
