= E3 AF =

Studio album by Dizzee Rascal
- Released: 30 October 2020
- Genre: Grime
- Length: 33:33
- Label: Dirtee Stank; Island

Dizzee Rascal chronology
Don't Gas Me (2018)	E3 AF (2020)	Don't Take It Personal (2024)

Singles from E3 AF
- 1. "L.L.L.L. (Love Life Live Large)" Released: 20 August 2020; 2. "Act Like You Know" Released: 10 September 2020; 3. "Body Loose" Released: 2 October 2020

Professional ratings
Aggregate scores
Source	Rating
AnyDecentMusic?	6.9/10
Metacritic	79/100
Review scores
Source	Rating
AllMusic	4/5 stars
The Arts Desk	3/5 stars
Clash	8/10
DIY	3.5/5 stars
The Line of Best Fit	7/10
musicOMH	3.5/5 stars
NME	4/5 stars
The Observer	4/5 stars
Pitchfork	7.2/10
The Telegraph	4/5 stars

E3 AF is the seventh studio album by English rapper Dizzee Rascal, released on 30 October 2020 by Dirtee Stank and Island Records.

== Background ==
E3 AF is Rascal's first full-length album since 2017's Raskit.

Rascal announced the album on Instagram on 19 August 2020, stating:

"I've spent the last 3 years losing and finding myself in music and I've made something flawless. I made this album for YOU! I want you to play it at home, in your car or wherever you want but I want you to listen to it all the way through and you better have some BASS!! The link-ups are mad and I didn't come to play! You're welcome."

The album's title refers to the "E3" postal code district where he grew up in Bow, East London, while "AF" stands for "African" referring to his West African heritage. The album title is a callback to a derogatory term Dizzee was called growing up in London: ‘E3 African’

Shortly before the album's release, Rascal was scheduled to perform alongside Wiley, M Huncho, and The Streets at Utilita Live from the Drive In, a series of socially distanced drive-in concerts, which were cancelled due to reimposed COVID-19 lockdowns in Leicester, England.

== Release and promotion ==
The album was announced on 19 August 2020, alongside the release of the lead single. The album was originally announced for release on 9 October, but was later delayed to 30 October.

=== Singles ===
E3 AF was preceded by three singles. The lead single "L.L.L.L. (Love Life Live Large)", featuring Chip, was released on 20 August 2020. The second single, "Act Like You Know", featuring Smoke Boys, was released on 10 September 2020. The third and final single, "Body Loose", which samples the Architechs 2000 hit "Body Groove", was released on 2 October 2020.

== Track listing ==
E3 AF track listing
No.	Title	Length
1.	"God Knows" (featuring P Money)	4:05
2.	"That's Too Much" (featuring Frisco and D Double E)	4:17
3.	"L.L.L.L. (Love Life Live Large)" (featuring Chip)	3:14
4.	"Body Loose"	2:31
5.	"You Don't Know" (radio edit)	2:30
6.	"Energies + Powers" (featuring Alicaì Harley and Steel Banglez)	2:54
7.	"Eastside" (featuring Ghetts and Kano)	3:06
8.	"Act Like You Know" (featuring Smoke Boys)	3:39
9.	"Don't Be Dumb" (featuring Ocean Wisdom)	3:31
10.	"Be Incredible" (featuring Rob Jones TV)	3:41
Total length:		33:33

== Personnel ==
- Dizzee Rascal – vocals, primary artist (1–10)

Other musicians

- P Money – guest vocals (1)
- D Double E – guest vocals (2)
- Frisco – guest vocals (2)
- Chip – guest vocals (3)
- Steel Banglez – guest vocals (6)
- Alicaì Harley – guest vocals (6)
- Ghetts – guest vocals (7)
- Kano – guest vocals (7)
- Smoke Boys – guest vocals (8)
- Ocean Wisdom – guest vocals (9)
- Rob Jones TV – guest vocals (10)

== Charts ==
Chart performance for E3 AF
Chart (2020)	Peak position
Scottish Albums (OCC)	26
UK Albums (OCC)	13
