= I Think We're Gonna Need a Bigger Boat =

2009 studio album by the Brighton Port Authority

Studio album by The Brighton Port Authority
- Released: 6 January 2009
- Genres: Indie rock, electronic, pop
- Length: 42:24
- Label: Southern Fried
- Producers: Norman Cook; Simon Thornton

I Think We're Gonna Need a Bigger Boat is the only studio album of the British electronic act the Brighton Port Authority. It was released on Southern Fried on 6 January 2009 exclusively on amazon.com, with a regular release on 3 February.

The Brighton Port Authority was a project of the musician Norman Cook (Fatboy Slim) and his longtime engineer, Simon Thornton. It features collaborations with Tom Gandey (aka Cagedbaby), Justin Robertson, Ashley Beedle, Lateef, Martha Wainwright, Jamie T, David Byrne, Dizzee Rascal, Iggy Pop, Olly Hite, Connan Mockasin, Pete York, Jack Peñate and Emmy the Great.

Professional ratings
Review scores
Source	Rating
Allmusic	4/5 stars
Billboard	(favorable)
Blender	3/5 stars
Now Magazine	2/5 stars
Pitchfork	(5.7/10)
PopMatters	6/10 stars
Spin	3/5 stars
URB	2/5 stars

== Track listing ==
Collaborators for each track are listed after the length.

1. "He's Frank (Slight Return)" – 3:16 (Iggy Pop)
  - Cover of a song by The Monochrome Set
2. "Dirty Sheets" – 3:23 (Pete York)
3. "Jumps the Fence" – 3:33 (Connan Mockasin)
4. "Should I Stay or Should I Blow" – 2:29 (Ashley Beedle)
5. "Island" – 4:26 (Justin Robertson)
6. "Local Town" – 3:08 (Jamie T)
7. "Seattle" – 3:55 (Emmy the Great)
8. "Spade" – 3:15 (Martha Wainwright)
9. "Superman" – 3:43 (Simon Thornton)
10. "Superlover" – 4:11 (Cagedbaby)
11. "Toe Jam" – 3:22 (David Byrne and Dizzee Rascal)
12. "So It Goes" – 3:37 (Olly Hite)
  - Cover of a song by Nick Lowe

Japanese Version of the album also contains two bonus tracks:

"Electric Love" – 4:21
1. "So Fukt" – 3:28 (Lateef)
