= Money Right =

Song by Dizzee Rascal, featuring vocals from Skepta

Single by Dizzee Rascal featuring Skepta

from the album Don't Gas Me
- Released: 6 September 2018
- Length: 3:20
- Label: Island Records; Dirtee Stank

Dizzee Rascal singles chronology
"Space" (2017)	"Money Right" (2018)	"Blessed" (2019)

Skepta singles chronology
"Stay with It" (2018)	"Money Right" (2018)	"Like to Party" (2018)

"Money Right" is a song performed by English rapper Dizzee Rascal, featuring vocals from English rapper Skepta. It was released as the lead single from Dizzee Rascal's EP Don't Gas Me on 6 September 2018. The song peaked at number 68 on the UK Singles Chart.

== Background ==
Speaking to Julie Adenuga on Beats 1, Apple Music, Dizzee Rascal said that his collaboration with Skepta came about because they were both in the same building working on music, "He showed me the instrumental for this and I stood up, I said, 'Nah, we have to do this.' I understood it. It's one of them ones that everyone our age or above would think, 'Why didn’t I do that?'"

== Music video ==
A music video to accompany the release of "Money Right" was first released onto YouTube on 18 October 2018.

== Charts ==
Chart (2018)	Peak position
UK Singles (Official Charts)	68

== Release history ==
Region	Date	Format	Label
United Kingdom	6 September 2018	Digital download; streaming	Island Records; Dirtee Stank
