= Smurfie Syco =

- Born: 16 June 1997 (age 29)
- Genres: R&B, grime, hip hop, dubstep
- Occupations: DJ, record producer, business manager, investor, CEO
- Instrument: Mixer
- Years active: 2002–present
- Labels: R.O.A.D. Entertainment; Dirtee Stank Recordings
- Website: roadent.co.uk

Teriy Keys (/ˈtɛri ˈkiːs/ TERR-ee KEESS) also known as Smurfie Syco is a British DJ, remixer, record producer, music executive, A&R and businessman / investor. He is the founder and co-chief executive officer of R.O.A.D. Entertainment Global

Smurfie Syco is pseudonym used in-conjunction some his earlier releases which is a signed act to Dizzee Rascal's Dirtee Stank Label, in 2010; Smurfie Syco received national press surrounding the campaign for the release of SMURFIESYCO.COM album. He also featured in Mix Mag "Artist's of 2010".

Keys has credits on multiple studio singles/albums including solo and executive work on other artists projects most notably Smurfie Syco (2009), I'm The Best I Can't Help It (Mixtape) (2011).

In 2013, Teriy was short-listed in Music Week magazine's publication for the "30 under 30" best of the rest most influential music industry executives.

== Music career ==
In 2003, the grime group Cold Society was formed, and included Keys and like UK urban pioneer Dizzee Rascal they were making music that was a derivative of Garage. For a while there was not even a name for it. The name "grime" was the one that stuck. While performing with Cold Society, he performed some songs including, "Just Like You" in 2002, which was released years later on SMURFIESYCO.COM compilations album on Dizzee Rascal's independent record label in 2009. He also performed on Dizzee Rascal's 2010 mixtape, "Foot N' Mouth".

== Business career ==
=== Dirtee Stank Recordings ===
2006, His music career has been managed by Dizzee Rascal under pseudonym Smurfie Syco. Keys became the company's executive producer and A&R in January 2009.

=== R.O.A.D. Group ===
2009, Keys become co-chief executive officer and manager director of R.O.A.D. Entertainment Global, in a joint venture deal which founded three core subsidiaries of R.O.A.D. Group which primarily specialising in entertainment and training sectors of in the music, television, publishing, telecommunications/internet and video games industries.

2006, he founded Chocolate Label; an umbrella imprint which housed release under Dizzee Rascal's Dirtee Stank Label. December 2009, he signed a joint venture deal incorporating the global entertainment company, R.O.A.D. Group. (see acronym: Righteous Organised Always Determined)

R.O.A.D. Group is made up of three core subsidiaries – R.O.A.D. Music Group, R.O.A.D. Media Television and R.O.A.D. Academy CIC.

R.O.A.D. Academy is a registered CIC Community Interest Company which works with NEETs which is a government acronym for people currently "not in education, employment, or training" targeting people aged between 16 and 24. He also currently serves as the academic administration of R.O.A.D. Academy CIC PLC.

In 2012, Keys was appointed managing director of holding company R.O.A.D Group, which is the parent company to global 360 entertainment company R.O.A.D. Entertainment Global. R.O.A.D. Group released a statement in August 2012, stating they had signed a new business venture with haute fashion house Widows Son Vexillum a bespoke couture (clothing company).

== Personal life ==
On 20 November 2014, Teriy Keys won 'Outstanding Contribution to Arts and the Community' Award by Greater London Authority event present by the Mayor of Haringey, Mayor Councillor Kaushika Amin.

== Discography ==
=== Studio albums ===
- Smurfie Syco (2009)
- So Far Removed (2013)

=== Mixtapes ===
- When Times Are Cold (mixtape) (2005)
- I’m The Best I Can’t Help It (mixtape) (2010)
- Dizzee Rascal – Foot N' Mouth (mixtape) (2011)
- Dirtee TV.com Vol.1 mixed by DJ MK (2012)
- POWERS E.P (2012)
- Dirtee TV.com Vol.2 mixed by DJ MK (2013)

=== Artist Credits ===
- This Way (Ft. NERO (dubstep) (2008)
- Dizzee Rascal – Klappin (Ft. Smurfie Syco) (2009)
- D Double E – Be Like Me (Ft. Smurfie Syco) (Bluku Bluku E.P) (2012)

=== Producer Credits ===
- Wonder Girls – Like Money (Ft. Akon) (2012)
- RoXXXan – Guerilla (Prod. Smurfie Syco) (Mixtape) (2013)
- NONAGON – CL + TAEYANG (Prod. Smurfie Syco) [Advert] (2014)
