= The HeavyTrackerz =

The Heavytrackerz are a group of record producers, songwriters and instrumentalists from Walthamstow, East London. The group currently consists of Lord Teedot, G.Tank and RasEye. HeavyTrackerz are often recognized as producers of singles for grime artists and UK rappers. Their songs are recognizable by a voice stating "trackerz" in time with the instrumental introduction. An example is clearly heard in the 2015 Dizzee Rascal single "Nutcrackerz".

== Notable productions ==
Meridian Dan's debut single "German Whip" (2014) peaked at number 13 on the UK Singles Chart. The track features vocals from Jme and Big H.

Stormzy's single "Standard" and Big Narstie's track "Woah" on Dice Recordings were also produced by The Heavytrackerz.

Dizzee Rascal's single "Nutcrackerz", the name in reference to the producers, is a re-imagining of Pyotr Ilyich Tchaikovsky's Dance of the Sugar Plum Fairy.
