= Ocean Wisdom =

English rapper (born 1993)

- Also known as: Wizzy; Ocean "Spitz" Wisdom
- Born: Ocean Alexander Alouwishas Wisdom; 17 May 1993 (age 32); Camden, London, England
- Origin: Brighton, England
- Genres: Hip hop; Grime
- Occupation: Rapper
- Years active: 2014–present
- Labels: High Focus; Beyond Measure

Ocean Alexander Alouwishas Wisdom (born 17 May 1993) is an English rapper from Camden Town, London. His largest claim to fame is his debut single "Walkin'", in which he delivered lyrics faster than Eminem's "Rap God" (which itself has received acclaim for its rapping speed), at 4.45 words per second, as opposed to "Rap God"'s 4.31.

== Career ==
Ocean Wisdom was born in Camden, London but spent some of his teenage years in Brighton, attending fee paying private school Brighton College, before relocating back to his hometown. His debut single "Walkin'" was released in 2014 on High Focus Records.

The song was noted as having been delivered at a faster speed than Eminem's "Rap God" after Ocean managed to fit 4.45 words per second in his track compared to the 4.31 words per second Eminem fit in "Rap God".

He released an EP, Splittin' the Racket, on 20 August 2015.

His debut full-length LP, Chaos '93, was released in February 2016 and entered the official iTunes album charts the same day, peaking at number 10. Chaos '93 was entirely produced by Dirty Dike.

Ocean Wisdom's second album, Wizville, was released in February 2018, peaking at number 39 in the Official UK Album Charts. It featured collaborations with artists such as Method Man (of the Wu-Tang Clan), Rodney P of London Posse, Dizzee Rascal, and Roots Manuva. Production came from multiple producers, including Dirty Dike, Muckaniks, Leaf Dog, 184 and Pete Cannon. Later, his song "Tom & Jerry" was featured on the soundtrack of the EA Sports' FIFA 19.

In March 2019, after releasing his final single "Revvin'" on the High Focus Records label, Ocean formed his new record label, Beyond Measure, in cooperation with Warner Music. He has since released three singles on the label – "4AM", "Blessed", and "Breathin'", all of which are featured on his album Big Talk, Vol. 1.

In 2020, Ocean Wisdom collaborated with the Italian rapper Nitro on his single "MURDAMURDAMURDA", from the album GarbAge.

In March 2021, Ocean Wisdom released his fourth album, Stay Sane, featuring artists such as Maverick Sabre, Novelist and Kojey Radical.

In 2023, Ocean Wisdom was featured on a track with P Money titled "Junkyard" following with its own music video. Shortly after, in April 2024, Ocean Wisdom released his 1st single since 2021 which simultaneously released with the Music Video on YouTube, titled "I Exist".

== Discography ==
=== Studio albums ===
| Title | Album details | Peak chart positions |
| Title | Album details | UK |
|---|---|---|
| Chaos 93 | Release date: 22 February 2016; Label: High Focus Records; Formats: CD, digital download, vinyl | — |
| Wizville | Release date: 23 February 2018; Label: High Focus Records; Formats: CD, digital download, vinyl, cassette tape | 39 |
| Big Talk, Vol. 1 | Release date: 11 October 2019; Label: Beyond Measure | 94 |
| Stay Sane | Release date: 19 February 2021; Label: Beyond Measure | — |
| Fight Club | Release date: 30 August 2024; Label: Beyond Measure | — |

=== Singles ===
- "Walkin'" (2014)
- "Splittin' the Racket" (2015)
- "Snakes & Blaggers" (2016)
- "One Take" (2016)
- "High Street" (2016)
- "Eye Contact" (2017)
- "Brick or Bat" (2017)
- "Don" (2018)
- "Ting Dun" featuring Method Man (2018)
- "Revvin'" featuring Dizzee Rascal (2018)
- "4AM" (2019)
- "Blessed" featuring Dizzee Rascal (2019)
- "Breathin'" featuring P Money (2019)
- "Drilly Rucksack" (2020)
- "Uneven Lives" featuring Maverick Sabre (2021)
- "Shorty Gud" (2021)
- "I Exist" (2024)
- "Near Life Experience" (2024)
- "No Squids" featuring K Koke (2024)

=== Features ===
- "EWOK" Kidkanevil (2015)
- "100 Standard" Foreign Beggars (2016)
- "Inside the Ride" Fliptrix (2018)
- "Coconuts" Frankie Stew and Harvey Gunn (2018)
- "Don't Be Dumb" Dizzee Rascal (2020)
- "MURDAMURDAMURDA" Nitro (2020)
- "Circles" Rag'n'bone Man (2022)
- "Dark Days (UK)" Onyx (2023)
- "Bang Bang" Joe Thwaites, Jim Fowler (2023)
- "Junkyard" P Money, Whiney (2023)
