= Boy in da Corner =

Studio album by Dizzee Rascal
- Released: 21 July 2003
- Recorded: October 2001–March 2003
- Studios: Belly of the Beast, Raskits Lair (London, England)
- Genre: Grime
- Length: 57:08
- Label: XL
- Producers: Dizzee Rascal; Chubby Dread; Moulders; Mr. Cage; Taz; Vanguard

Dizzee Rascal chronology
Sidewinder Live (2002)	Boy in da Corner (2003)	Showtime (2004)

Singles from Boy in da Corner
- 1. "I Luv U" Released: 26 May 2003; 2. "Fix Up, Look Sharp" Released: 18 August 2003; 3. "Jus' a Rascal" Released: 24 November 2003

Boy in da Corner is the debut studio album by English rapper and producer Dizzee Rascal. It was first released on 21 July 2003 by XL Recordings in the United Kingdom before being released the following year in the United States.

A widespread critical success, Boy in da Corner became one of the most acclaimed records of 2003 and went on to win the Mercury Prize for best album from the UK and Ireland. It also peaked at number 23 on the British albums chart and sold over 250,000 copies worldwide by 2004. With the album's success, Dizzee Rascal gave mainstream exposure to grime music while becoming the UK's first internationally recognised emcee.

== Background ==
Around the age of 14, Dizzee Rascal became an amateur drum and bass DJ, also rapping over tracks as customary in sound system culture, and making occasional appearances on local pirate radio stations. Two years on, aged 16, he self-produced his first single, "I Luv U", which was included on his debut. The same year, Rascal signed a solo deal with the record label XL.

== Critical reception ==
Professional ratings
Aggregate scores
Source	Rating
Metacritic	92/100
Review scores
Source	Rating
AllMusic	5/5 stars
Blender	4/5 stars
Entertainment Weekly	B+
The Guardian	5/5 stars
Mojo	5/5 stars
NME	9/10
Pitchfork	9.4/10
Rolling Stone	4/5 stars
Spin	A−
The Village Voice	A−

Boy in da Corner received widespread acclaim from critics. At Metacritic, the album received an aggregate score of 92 out of 100, based on 28 reviews. NME called it "one of the most assured debut albums of the last five years". Entertainment Weekly stated that, "Combining U.K. garage beats and a distinctly British sensibility, Rascal spits out phrases with the energy and finesse of a championship boxer". Rolling Stone wrote, "If you want a vision of the future of hip-hop and techno, get this record". AllMusic called it "Startling, tirelessly powerful, and full of unlimited dimensions, nothing could truly weigh down this debut". Pitchfork's Scott Plagenhoef stated, "Dizzee's despairing wail, focused anger, and cutting sonics places him on the front lines in the battle against a stultifying Britain, just as Pete Townshend, Johnny Rotten, and Morrissey have been in the past". In The Village Voice, Robert Christgau wrote that "His adolescent gulps and yowls are street-Brit with a Jamaican liquidity, as lean, eccentric, and arresting as the beats." Fellow Village Voice critic Jeff Chang stated, "When Dizzee thinks very deeply—worrying about growing up, about those around him who won't grow up, about dying before he grows up—he sounds like, what else can we call it, the real thing". Stylus Magazine stated, "Most of Boy in Da Corner's most compelling moments come from this uneasy interaction between irrational youth and ultra-rational mechanized society". Alexis Petridis from The Guardian called Dizzee "the most original and exciting artist to emerge from dance music in a decade".

Boy in da Corner won Dizzee Rascal the 2003 Mercury Prize, an annual music award for the best album from the United Kingdom and Ireland, making him the second rapper to win the award. In 2009, it was voted the sixth greatest album of all time by MTV Base. The album was included in the book 1001 Albums You Must Hear Before You Die. According to B.J. Steiner from Complex, "Boy in Da Corner brought grime—an influential subgenre of hip-hop birthed from the endless creativity of a bunch of kids from the United Kingdom—to the rest of the world and made a young Dizzee Rascal, his country's first international rap superstar."

== Commercial performance ==
Boy in da Corner was released on 21 July 2003 in the United Kingdom by XL Recordings and 20 January 2004 in the United States by Matador Records. It reached number twenty-three on the UK Albums Chart and was certified gold by the British Phonographic Industry (BPI), having shipped 100,000 copies there. By 2004, it had sold over 250,000 copies worldwide, and over 58,000 copies in the US by 2007. The album was certified Platinum (300,000 copies) in July 2018, 15 years after its release, making it Dizzee's second Platinum selling album after Tongue n' Cheek.

== Legacy ==
In 2016, Dizzee Rascal performed Boy in da Corner in full for the first time first in New York and then in east London at the Copper Box Arena. Contemporary critics praised the album's continuing influence on grime and ageless sound. In late 2016, a bootleg fan mixtape of rare recordings from the Boy in Da Corner era called Left in da Corner was released.

On 21 July 2023 XL Recordings released the 20th Anniversary Edition of the album, featuring 14 previously unreleased songs.

== Track listing ==
All tracks were produced by Dizzee Rascal, except where noted.

No.	Title	Writer(s)	Length
1.	"Sittin' Here"	Dylan Mills	4:05
2.	"Stop Dat"	Mills	3:40
3.	"I Luv U"	Mills	4:05
4.	"Brand New Day"	Mills	4:00
5.	"2 Far" (featuring Wiley)	Mills; Richard Cowie	3:07
6.	"Fix Up, Look Sharp"	Mills; Nick Detnon; Billy Squier	3:44
7.	"Cut 'Em Off"	Mills	3:53
8.	"Hold Ya Mouf" (featuring God's Gift)	Mills; Jerome Dow	2:55
9.	"Round We Go" (co-produced by Chubby Dread)	Mills; Hector	4:13
10.	"Jus' a Rascal" (featuring Taz) (co-produced by Taz & Vanguard)	Mills; Tesmond Rowe; Vanguard Vardoen	3:39
11.	"Wot U On?"	Mills	4:50
12.	"Jezebel"	Mills	3:36
13.	"Seems 2 Be"	Mills	3:46
14.	"Live O"	Mills	3:35
15.	"Do It!"	Mills	4:06
Total length:			57:08

US edition bonus track
No.	Title	Writer(s)	Length
16.	"Vexed"	Mills	4:11

20th anniversary edition track listing
No.	Title	Writer(s)	Length
1.	"Vexed"	Dylan Mills	4:11
2.	"Street Fighter"	Mills	3:19
3.	"I Luv U - Remix" (featuring Wiley & Sharky Major)	Mills; Richard Cowie; Sharky Major	4:24
4.	"Give U More" (featuring D Double E)	Mills; Darren Dickson	3:25
5.	"Win" (featuring Breeze)	Mills; Breeze	2:25
6.	"We Aint Havin It" (featuring Wiley)	Mills; Cowie	3:45
7.	"Kryme" (featuring Redrum & Sharky Major)	Mills; Redrum; Sharky Major	3:41
8.	"Ready 4 War" (featuring Armour, Stormin & Sharky Major)	Mills; Armour; Stormin; Sharky Major	4:40
9.	"Street Fighter - Instrumental"		2:41
10.	"Go - Instrumental"		4:34
11.	"Ho - Instrumental"		4:05
12.	"String Ho - Instrumental"		2:44
13.	"Ting Ting - Instrumental"		2:05
14.	"Wheel - Instrumental"		3:48
Total length:			107:00

Notes

- "Stop Dat" features background vocals by Armour of N.A.S.T.Y. Crew
- "I Luv U" features additional vocals by Jeanine Jacques
- "Wot U On?" features additional vocals by Caramel
- "Seems 2 Be" features additional vocals by Claire Cottrell

Sample credits

- "Fix Up, Look Sharp" includes a sample of "The Big Beat", performed by Billy Squier.

== Personnel ==
The album's credits are adapted from AllMusic.

- Armour – background vocals
- Gareth Bayliss – sleeve design assistant
- Caramel – vocals
- Dean Chalkley – sleeve photo
- Chubby Dread – producer
- Claire Cottrell – vocals
- Nick Detnon – A&R
- Ben Drury – cover design, logo design
- God's Gift – performer
- Nick Huggett – artist coordination
- Dylan Mills – composer
- Tesmond Rowe – composer
- Vanguard Vardoen – composer
- Wiley – performer

== Charts ==
=== Weekly charts ===
Chart (2003–04)	Peak position
UK Albums (Official Charts)	23
US Heatseekers Albums (Billboard)	16
US Independent Albums (Billboard)	14

=== Year-end charts ===
Chart (2003)	Position
UK Albums (OCC)	144

== Certifications ==
Certifications and sales for "Boy in da Corner"
Region	Certification	Certified units/sales
United Kingdom (BPI)	Platinum	300,000^{‡}
^{‡} Sales+streaming figures based on certification alone.
