= Jus' a Rascal =

Single by Dizzee Rascal

from the album Boy in da Corner
- Released: 24 November 2003
- Recorded: 2002
- Genre: British hip hop; grime; rap rock
- Length: 3:27
- Label: XL
- Songwriters: Dylan Mills; Tesmond Rowe; Vanguard Vardoen
- Producers: Dizzee Rascal; Taz; Vanguard

Dizzee Rascal singles chronology
"Lucky Star" (2003)	"Jus' a Rascal" (2003)	"Stand Up Tall" (2004)

"Jus' a Rascal" is the third single by British rapper Dizzee Rascal, and third and final single from his debut studio album, Boy in da Corner. The single became his third top 40 hit, peaking at number 30 and spending three weeks inside the top 75 of the UK Singles Chart.

"Jus' a Rascal" was used in an episode of Skins along with "Fix Up, Look Sharp", and in the film Kidulthood. Part of the song is also used in series three of Hustle.

== Track listing ==
Digital download
No.	Title	Length
1.	"Jus' a Rascal" (clean radio version)	3:29
2.	"Jus' a Rascal"	3:27

CD bonus video
No.	Title	Length
3.	"Fix Up, Look Sharp" (video)	3:16

== Music video ==
A music video was made for the song, which was directed by Nima Nourizadeh and is mainly filled up with Dizzee Rascal dancing. Tinchy Stryder makes a cameo in the video. The video was filmed during David Blaine's exit from the container during his Above the Below endurance stunt.

== Charts ==
Chart (2003)	Peak position
UK Singles (Official Charts)	30
UK Indie (Official Charts)	1
UK Hip Hop/R&B (Official Charts)	8
