= Bonkers (song) =

Single by Dizzee Rascal and Armand van Helden

from the album Tongue n' Cheek
- B-side: "Butterfly"
- Released: 17 May 2009
- Recorded: 2009
- Genre: Hip house; fidget house
- Length: 2:56
- Label: Dirtee Stank
- Composer: Armand van Helden
- Lyricist: Dizzee Rascal
- Producer: Armand van Helden

Dizzee Rascal singles chronology
"Toe Jam" (2008)	"Bonkers" (2009)	"Holiday" (2009)

Armand van Helden singles chronology
"Ski Hard" (2009)	"Bonkers" (2009)

"Bonkers" is a song by English rapper Dizzee Rascal and American producer Armand van Helden. It is the first single released from Rascal's fourth studio album, Tongue n' Cheek. Rascal released the track under his own record label, Dirtee Stank Recordings on 17 May 2009 in the United Kingdom, entering at the top of the UK Singles Chart, marking Dizzee's second number-one single, third top-ten single and eleventh top-forty hit on the chart. This was also Van Helden's third number-one single, his first in ten years (with "You Don't Know Me" being his previous number-one single). In October 2011, NME placed it at number 59 on its list "150 Best Tracks of the Past 15 Years".

== Background ==
Armand van Helden emailed Dizzee the music while he was living in the US. Dizzee instantly realised it had potential to be a festival anthem, and wrote the lyrics to it with that in mind, which he claims took him 25 minutes.

The record was selected as Jo Whiley's Pet Sound and Sara Cox's 'Weekend Anthem'. Rascal said in an interview with The Sun newspaper that he is unashamed of the song's pop hooks, and, despite initially having a strong dislike for house music, he has enjoyed making the song. On 5 May 2009, The King Blues chose "Bonkers" as their cover when they were in the Live Lounge with Jo Whiley.

Rascal performed the song live during the opening ceremony of the 2012 London Olympics as part of a montage of British pop music.

== Usage in media ==
The song appeared on the Nintendo DS and Wii video game Need for Speed: Nitro, which takes place in Rio de Janeiro, Cairo, Madrid, Singapore, and Dubai for the Wii version, as well as in Need For Speed: Most Wanted.

The song appeared in a trailer for the season one DVD of Strange Hill High.

The song appeared in the film Kingsman: The Secret Service.

A parody of the song, retitled "Minted", was used in the Horrible Histories sketch about the wealthiest man in ancient Rome, Marcus Licinius Crassus. The lead vocals were performed by Simon Farnaby.

"Bonkers" was used as the track behind the season three trailer for Rick and Morty.

For many years, English darts player James Wade used the song as his walk-on music, playfully referring to his own struggles with mental health.

== Music video ==
There is a music video for the song that shows Dizzee Rascal on an inflatable pickup.

== Track listings ==
- CD single / 12" vinyl
1. "Bonkers" (Radio Edit) – 3:01
2. "Bonkers" (Single Dub) – 3:24
3. "Bonkers" (Album Version) – 4:29
4. "Bonkers" (Club Mix) – 5:21
5. "Bonkers" (Club Dub) – 5:30
6. "Bonkers" (Extended Club Dub) – 5:53
7. "Butterfly" – 3:53
- Digital download
1. "Bonkers" (Radio Edit) – 3:01
2. "Bonkers" (Single Version) – 3:24
3. "Bonkers" (Album Version) – 4:29
4. "Bonkers" (Club Mix) – 5:21
5. "Bonkers" (Club Dub) – 5:30
6. "Bonkers" (Extended Club Dub) – 5:53
7. "Butterfly" – 3:53
8. "Bonkers" (Music Video) – 2:56
- Bonkers (Remixes) – single
1. "Bonkers (As Heard on Radio Soulwax Edit)" – 3:45 (Only available in Belgium and The Netherlands)
2. "Bonkers (Doorly Remix)" – 4:30

== Charts ==
=== Weekly charts ===
Chart (2009)	Peak position
Australia (ARIA)	13
Austria (Ö3 Austria Top 40)	26
Belgium (Ultratop 50 Flanders)	6
Netherlands (Single Top 100)	63
Finland (Suomen virallinen lista)	18
Germany (GfK)	58
Ireland (IRMA)	3
New Zealand (Recorded Music NZ)	12
Switzerland (Schweizer Hitparade)	88
UK Singles (Official Charts)	1
UK Dance (Official Charts Company)	1
UK Indie (Official Charts)	1

=== Year-end charts ===
Chart (2009)	Position
Australian Singles Chart	66
UK Singles Chart	15

== Certifications ==
Certifications for "Bonkers"
Region	Certification	Certified units/sales
Australia (ARIA)	3× Platinum	210,000^{‡}
New Zealand (RMNZ)	3× Platinum	90,000^{‡}
United Kingdom (BPI)	3× Platinum	1,800,000^{‡}
^{‡} Sales+streaming figures based on certification alone.

== Release history ==
Region	Date	Format
United Kingdom	17 May 2009	CD single
United Kingdom	17 May 2009	Digital download
Australia	22 May 2009	Digital download
