= Newham Generals =

British grime duo

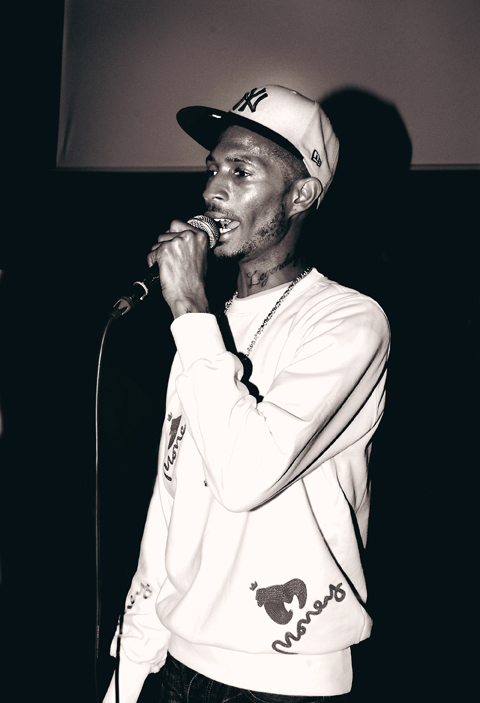
- D Double E of Newham Generals performing live

Background information
- Origin: Forest Gate, East London, England
- Genres: Grime; dubstep; UK garage; jungle
- Years active: 2004–present
- Labels: Dirtee Stank; Braindead ENT; Bluku Music
- Members: D Double E Footsie
- Past members: Monkstar; DJ Tubby; DJ MS1
- Website: www.newhamgenerals.com

Newham Generals are a grime duo from East London, currently consisting of MCs D Double E and Footsie.

They are best known for their singles "Frontline", "Hard" and "Like It Or Not" as well as their live performances. The group was founded in 2004, after D Double E had a disagreement with fellow members of his previous group N.A.S.T.Y Crew. Newham Generals built up a name for themselves through regular appearances on pirate radio stations and released a number of their singles on white label vinyl. Dizzee Rascal idolised D Double E as an MC in his youth and the group was signed to his record label Dirtee Stank in 2005 after D Double E showed Dirtee Stank a CD of the groups work, and promptly released a mix CD on the Hot Headz label in September 2006 entitled The Best of Newham Generals Vol. 1, which included new songs alongside early hits such as "Frontline", "Prang Man", Footsie's "Right Hooks" and D Double E's "Birds in the Sky". At the time, they also announced their intention to release a follow-up mixtape titled Welcome to Newham. Founding member Monkstar left the group in 2007. The group released their debut album Generally Speaking on Dirtee Stank in April 2009 which was their last release to feature Monkstar. They followed Generally Speaking with the release of the Bag of Grease EP the following year, as well as various solo projects.

The group's name is taken from Newham General Hospital, now known as Newham University Hospital.

== Discography ==
=== EPs ===
- 2010: Bag of Grease
- 2013: 5 Star General
- 2015: N to the G's

=== Albums ===
- 2006: The Best of Newham Generals
- 2009: Generally Speaking

== Side projects ==
DJ Tubby and Footsie ran their own record label Braindead Entertainment from 2002 to 2007 through which they released their own instrumentals. Footsie revived the label in 2012 to release his first solo vocal EP Zoot Break 2, this was followed by a joint instrumental EP with DJ Tubby entitled The Gray Area and by a 3 volume instrumental album series called King Original. D Double E has appeared as a featured artist on numerous releases as well as having released singles and a solo EP on Dirtee Stank, he also founded his own record label Bluku Music in 2014. Over the years he has featured on a number of prominent releases such as Skepta's "Ladies Hit Squad" from the 2016 album Konnichiwa alongside A$AP Nast.

Footsie's single "Work All Day" produced by Sukh Knight featured on Apple Inc.'s TV commercial for the IPhone 13 launched in September 2021.

=== D Double E discography ===
==== Albums ====
- 2018: Jackuum
- 2020: Double Or Nothing
- 2022: Bluku Bluku EP 2
- 2023: No Reign, No Flowers (with TenBillion Dreams)

==== Singles ====
- 2010: "Street Fighter Riddim"
- 2012: "Pumpin' It Out"
- 2012: "Be Like Me" (featuring Smurfie Syco)
- 2014: "Wolly"
- 2014: "Lovely Jubbly"
- 2015: "Like This"
- 2016: "Grim Reaper" (produced by Footsie)
- 2017: "How I Like It" (produced by Diamondz)
- 2017: “Shenanigans” (produced by Swifta Beater)

==== EPs ====
- 2011: Bluku Bluku EP
- 2012: Pumpin' It Out EP

=== Footsie discography ===
==== Singles ====
- 2012: "1 Spliff"
- 2012: "B.O.G. (Bag of Grease)" (featuring Darq E Freaker)
- 2013: "Spookfest" (featuring JME, D Double E, Jammer, P Money and Chronic)
- 2014: "Work All Day" (produced by Sukh Knight)
- 2016: "Hot Water" (featuring Giggs)
- 2016: "My Team"
- 2016: "Cold MC" (featuring Brakeman)
- 2019: "Music Money" (featuring D Double E & Jammer)
- 2020: "Keep It G (Chime and Grime)" (with Shakeable Germ, Phats & Small) (featuring D Double E, Orbital & J Appiah)

==== EPs ====
- 2012: Zoot Break 2
- 2015: On This Ting
- 2019: Running Man - EP
- 2019: Steppers - EP
- 2021: Wavedown Section - EP
- 2022: Roulette - EP (with BigMoviee)
- 2024: Soundman Ting - EP (with Dubkasm)

==== Instrumental albums ====
- 2013: King Original, Vol 1
- 2013: King Original, Vol 2
- 2014: King Original, Vol 3
- 2017: King Original, Vol 4
- 2020: King Original, Vol 5
- 2022: King Original, Vol 6 (KO6)
- 2024: King Original, Vol 7 (KO7)
