= Bassline Junkie =

Promotional single by Dizzee Rascal

from the album The Fifth
- Released: 1 January 2013
- Recorded: 2012
- Genre: Bassline, Comedy Hip Hop
- Length: 3:22 (album version) 2:48 (radio edit)
- Label: Dirtee Stank
- Songwriters: Dizzee Rascal; MJ Cole
- Producer: MJ Cole

"Bassline Junkie" is a song by British rapper Dizzee Rascal from his mixtape Dirtee TV.com – The Mixtape EP, Vol.2 (2013). The song was produced by MJ Cole and peaked at number 10 on the UK Singles Chart despite not being officially released as a single. The track also appeared on The Fifth, Dizzee's 2013 album, and was one of the few UK urban tracks on the album, with most tracks continuing his move away from grime and garage to other genres.

== Music video ==
The video was released on YouTube on 31 December 2012. It follows Rascal and his friend (played by comedian Eric Lampaert) preaching "the way of the bassline". They first visit a block of flats, where Rascal aggressively threatens a small boy after he turns off the "large speakers" that the song is playing through, only to be silenced himself when the boy's mother confronts him. From there, Rascal and his friend get in a taxi (1965 Ford Zodiac MkIII) and use a PA system to blast the song to the public. They then visit a prison, where he shows the prisoners a public service announcement-type video and "cleanse" the prisoners. They also cleanse a man in a pub. Rascal and his friend then visit a church, with Rascal dressed like a priest giving a sermon and his friend playing an organ with all its keys taped off apart from the bass notes. This sends the churchgoers into a frenzy, dancing wildly and tearing off their clothes. Rascal finally uses "the way of the bassline" to set a man on fire before the video ends.

== Commercial performance ==
"Bassline Junkie" debuted at number 72 on the UK Singles Chart on 13 January 2013. It entered the top 40 the following week at number 38, soon climbing up to number 14. The single peaked at number 10 in its fifth week. On the Scottish Singles Chart, "Bassline Junkie" debuted at number 32 on 27 January 2013, going on to peak at number 14 in its third week on the chart.

== Covers ==
The song was covered by the pirate/folk metal band Alestorm on their 2020 album Curse of the Crystal Coconut as one of the bonus tracks on the wooden box edition.

== Charts ==
=== Weekly charts ===
Weekly chart performance for "Bassline Junkie"
Chart (2013)	Peak position
Australia (ARIA)	61
Ireland (IRMA)	75
Scottish Singles Sales (Official Charts)	14
UK Singles (Official Charts)	10
UK Dance (Official Charts)	4

=== Year-end charts ===
Year-end chart performance for "Bassline Junkie"
Chart (2013)	Position
UK Singles (OCC)	94

== Certifications ==
Certifications for "Bassline Junkie"
Region	Certification	Certified units/sales
New Zealand (RMNZ)	Gold	15,000^{‡}
United Kingdom (BPI)	Platinum	600,000^{‡}
^{‡} Sales+streaming figures based on certification alone.

== Release history ==
Release history and formats for "Bassline Junkie"
Region	Date	Format	Label
United Kingdom	1 January 2013	CD-R; digital download	Dirtee Stank
