= Toe Jam (song) =

2008 single by the Brighton Port Authority featuring David Byrne and Dizzee Rascal

Single by The Brighton Port Authority featuring David Byrne and Dizzee Rascal

from the album I Think We're Gonna Need a Bigger Boat
- Released: 5 August 2008
- Genre: Electronic
- Length: 3:22
- Label: Southern Fried
- Songwriters: David Byrne, Dylan Mills
- Producers: Norman Cook, Simon Thornton

The Brighton Port Authority singles chronology
"Toe Jam" (2008)	"Seattle" (2008)

Dizzee Rascal singles chronology singles chronology
"Dance wiv Me" (2008)	"Toe Jam" (2008)	"Bonkers" (2009)

"Toe Jam" is the debut single by the British electronic act the Brighton Port Authority, released on 5 August 2008 from their debut album I Think We're Gonna Need a Bigger Boat. The song was composed by and features musician David Byrne and rapper Dizzee Rascal. The song was listed at number 14 on Rolling Stone magazine's list of the 100 best songs of 2008.

The music video for the song, directed by Keith Schofield, predominantly features naked dancers. The censor bars placed over their genital areas and breasts form figures on the screen. The music video received much attention on the Internet and was shown on opening night of the 6th Berlin International Directors Lounge. The song was also performed live on Saturday Night Live when Byrne was a musical guest in 2020.

== Charts ==
Chart (2008)	Peak position
Belgian Singles Chart (Ultratip Flanders)	58
UK Singles Chart	198
