= Yizzy =

English grime MC

- Born: 30 December 1999 (age 26)
- Origin: Lewisham, London
- Genres: Grime
- Years active: 2017–present
- Labels: Livin' Legendz; RTL Records
- Website: officialyizzy.com

Yizzy (born Yisrael Morgan Charles Parkins, 30 December 1999) is an English grime MC. In 2017, Yizzy released his debut EP This Is Life. His follow-up EP, S.O.S., was released in May 2018. He then released his third EP, Welcome To Grime Street, in 2019 and his fourth EP, 'Prince of Grime' in 2020.

== Personal life ==
Yizzy was born in Wales to a father from Jamaica and a Welsh mother. He is also a supporter of Arsenal F.C.

== Career ==
Yizzy (originally Young Yizzy) released 'Insanity EP' in 2016, with production credits featuring JME, Swifta Beater and K1. Yizzy's 2016 song 'Grime Kid' earned him runner up in Glastonbury Festival's 2017 Emerging Talent Competition, leading him to perform on a main stage. In September 2017, he became the first recipient of the Future Fund, a grant set up by BBC Music Introducing and PRS Foundation for up-and-coming artists. Yizzy has since played at Field Day 2019.

== Discography ==
=== Extended plays ===
| Title | Details |
|---|---|
| Insanity | Released: 13 April 2016; Label: n/a; Format: Digital Download |
| This Is Life | Released: 7 April 2017; Label: Livin' Legendz; Format: Digital Download |
| S.O.S. | Released: 4 May 2018; Label: Livin' Legendz; Format: Digital Download |
| Welcome To Grime Street | Released: 7 June 2019; Label: Livin' Legendz; Format: Digital Download |
| Prince of Grime | Released: February 2020; Label: Livin' Legendz; Format: Digital Download |

=== Singles ===
| Year | Title | Album |
|---|---|---|
| 2017 | Big Man (featuring Tuckz) | Non-album single |
| 2017 | Snakes n' Snitches (featuring Tuckz) | Non-album single |
| 2017 | Steppin | Non-album single |
| 2017 | Parental Guidance (featuring Specialist Moss) | Non-album single |
| 2017 | Leaders (featuring Reece West) | Non-album single |
| 2017 | Federally | Non-album single |
| 2017 | Anyone (featuring Skengdo & AM) | Non-album single |
| 2017 | Mr. Kray | Non-album single |
| 2017 | Do You Wanna | Non-album single |
| 2017 | Radio Danger | Non-album single |
| 2018 | BAP | S.O.S |
| 2018 | Hype Ting | Non-album single |
| 2018 | Keep Chasing | Non-album single |
| 2019 | Yeah | Welcome To Grime Street |
| 2019 | Freeze (featuring Devilman) | Welcome To Grime Street |
| 2019 | Deh Suh (featuring Scrufizzer) | Welcome To Grime Street |
| 2019 | Hustle Hard | Non-album single |
| 2019 | Back It (featuring Dizzee Rascal) | Non-album single |
