= Raskit =

Studio album by Dizzee Rascal
- Released: 21 July 2017
- Recorded: 2015–2017
- Genre: Grime; hip hop
- Length: 57:19
- Label: Dirtee Stank; Island
- Producer: Dizzee Rascal (also exec.); Cardo; Darkness; Deputy; Dan Farber; Donae'o; Salva; Teddy Samba; The Arcade; The HeavyTrackerz; Wilfred Kouassi; Valentino Khan

Dizzee Rascal chronology
| The Fifth (2013) | Raskit (2017) | Don't Gas Me (2018) |

Singles from Raskit
- 1. "Space" Released: 16 June 2017; 2. "Wot U Gonna Do?" Released: 7 July 2017; 3. "Bop N Keep It Dippin" Released: 19 October 2017; 4. "Ghost" Released: 5 March 2018

Raskit is the sixth studio album by English rapper Dizzee Rascal. It was released on 21 July 2017 by Dirtee Stank Recordings and Island Records. It is his first studio album in four years since The Fifth (2013). It was produced entirely by Dizzee Rascal alongside notable producers such as Cardo, Donae'o, Salva, Teddy Samba, The Arcade, The HeavyTrackerz and Valentino Khan, among others.

== Critical reception ==
Professional ratings
Aggregate scores
| Source | Rating |
|---|---|
| AnyDecentMusic? | 7.1/10 |
| Metacritic | 78/100 |
Review scores
| Source | Rating |
| AllMusic | 4/5 stars |
| Financial Times | 3/5 stars |
| The Guardian | 4/5 stars |
| The Independent | 4/5 stars |
| Mojo | 4/5 stars |
| NME | 4/5 stars |
| The Observer | 3/5 stars |
| Pitchfork | 7.0/10 |
| Q | 4/5 stars |
| The Times | 4/5 stars |

Raskit received generally favourable reviews from critics upon release. At Metacritic, which assigns a normalised rating out of 100 to reviews from mainstream publications, the album received an average score of 78, based on 12 reviews. Ben Cardew of Pitchfork stated that Raskit converges grime with hip hop and "retains The Fifth's deliberately divided identity, with beats that fall between grime’s crude electronic minimalism and trap’s skittering intricacy". Jordan Bassett of NME labelled Raskit a "brilliant return to grime" for Dizzee Rascal and "hasn’t sounded this vital in years". Andy Cowan of Mojo stated: "If 2013’s The Fifth was a rare, guest-heavy misstep that polished off rough edges to brazenly target a transatlantic audience, Raskit junks its predecessor’s egregious schmaltz for marauding bass and spartan trap backings."

== Track listing ==
Raskit
| No. | Title | Writer(s) | Producer(s) | Length |
|---|---|---|---|---|
| 1. | "Focus" | Dylan Mills | Darkness; Dizzee Rascal^{[a]} | 3:26 |
| 2. | "Wot U Gonna Do?" | Mills; Valentino Khan | Khan; Dizzee Rascal^{[a]} | 3:24 |
| 3. | "Space" | Mills; Salva | Salva; Dizzee Rascal^{[a]} | 3:55 |
| 4. | "I Ain't Even Gonna Lie" | Mills | The HeavyTrackerz; Teddy Samba; Wilfred Kouassi; Dizzee Rascal^{[a]} | 3:29 |
| 5. | "The Other Side" | Mills; Ronald Latour | Cardo; Dizzee Rascal^{[a]} | 3:36 |
| 6. | "Make It Last" | Mills; Jamil Pierre | Deputy; Dizzee Rascal^{[a]} | 3:14 |
| 7. | "Ghost" | Mills; Dan Farber | Farber; Dizzee Rascal | 2:59 |
| 8. | "Business Man" | Mills; Farber | Farber; Dizzee Rascal | 3:13 |
| 9. | "Bop n' Keep It Dippin" | Mills; Latour | Cardo; Dizzee Rascal^{[a]} | 4:25 |
| 10. | "She Knows What She Wants" | Mills; Latour | Cardo; Dizzee Rascal^{[a]} | 3:23 |
| 11. | "Dummy" | Mills; Latour | Cardo; Dizzee Rascal^{[a]} | 4:22 |
| 12. | "Everything Must Go" | Mills; Salva | Salva; Dizzee Rascal^{[a]} | 3:21 |
| 13. | "Slow Your Roll" | Mills; Farber | Farber; Dizzee Rascal^{[a]} | 3:51 |
| 14. | "Sick a Dis" | Mills; Ian Greenidge | Donae'o; Dizzee Rascal^{[a]} | 3:24 |
| 15. | "Way I Am" | Mills; Winston Howard; Kurtis Mckenzie; Jon Mills | The Arcade; Dizzee Rascal^{[a]} | 3:22 |
| 16. | "Man of the Hour" | Mills; Latour; Aelpéacha | Cardo; Dizzee Rascal^{[a]} | 3:55 |
| Total length: | | | | 57:19 |

Notes

- ^{^[a]} signifies an additional producer.

== Personnel ==
Credits adapted from Tidal.

- Cardo – producer (track 5, 9–11, 16)
- Colin Brain – assistant engineer (track 3, 6, 12, 14)
- Dan Farber – mixing, producer (track 7, 8, 13)
- Darkness – producer (track 1)
- Deputy – producer (track 6)
- Donae'o – producer (track 14)
- Dizzee Rascal – executive producer, mixing, producer (track 1–16)
- Jake Gordon – mixing (track 3, 6, 12, 14)
- Matthew "Formatt" DeFreitas – mixing (track 1, 4, 5, 9–11, 15–16)
- Mike Marsh – engineer (track 1–3)
- Niko – vocals (track 15)
- Salva – producer (track 3, 12),
- Teddy Samba – mixing (track 4), producer (track 4)
- The Arcade – producer (track 15)
- The HeavyTrackerz – producer (track 4)
- Wilfred Kouassi – producer (track 4)
- Valentino Khan – producer (track 2), engineer, mixer, programmer

== Charts ==
| Chart (2017) | Peak position |
|---|---|
| Scottish Albums (OCC) | 44 |
| UK Albums (OCC) | 10 |
