= Dizzee Rascal =

British rapper (born 1984)

Dizzee Rascal MBE
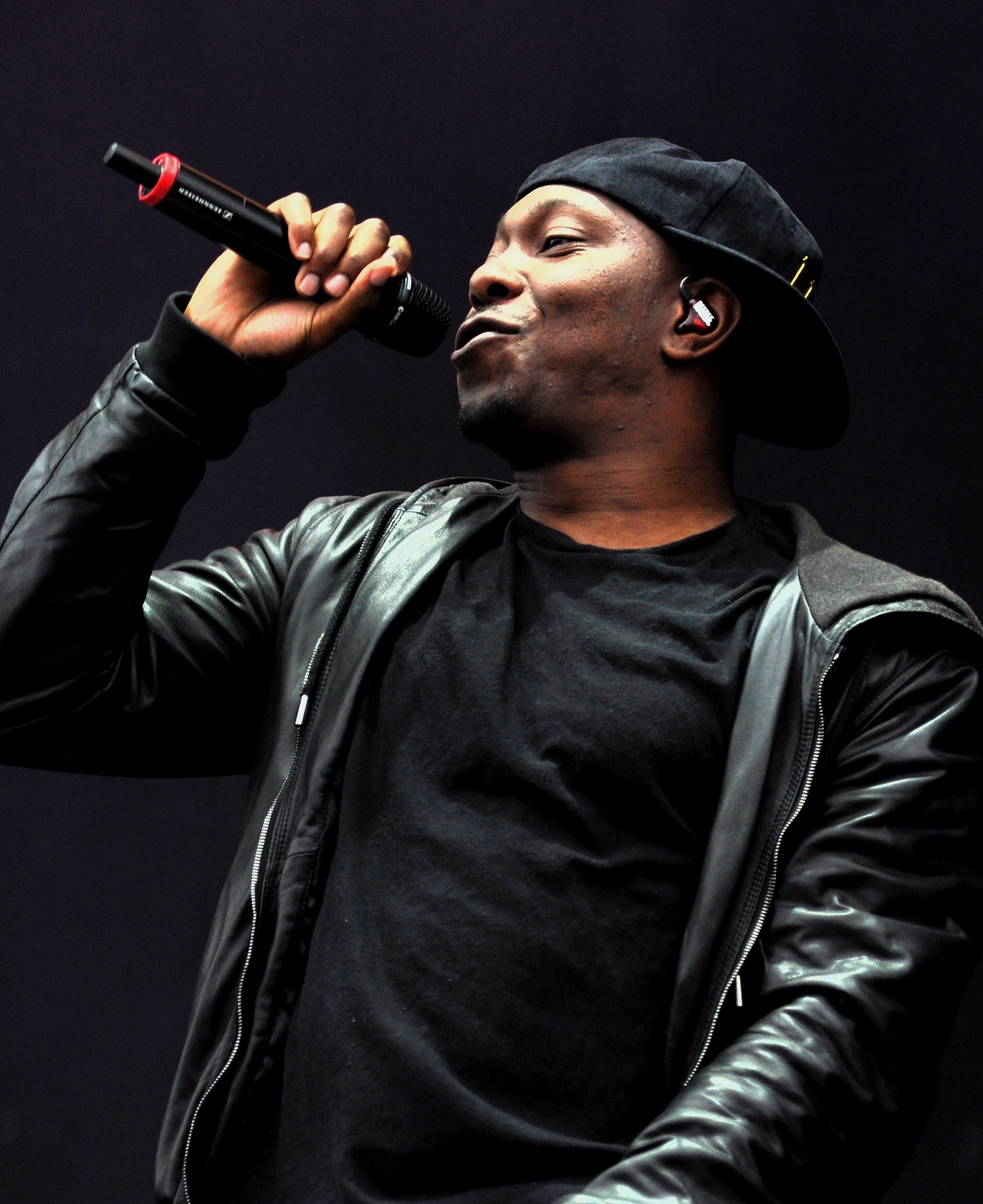
- Rascal performing at Rock am Ring 2013
- Born: Dylan Kwabena Mills; 18 September 1984 (age 42); London, England
- Other names: Captain Roscoe; Raskit
- Occupations: Rapper; songwriter; record producer
- Years active: 2000–present
- Works: Discography; songs
- Children: 2
- Awards: Full list
- Musical career
- Origin: Bow, London
- Genres: British hip hop; grime; bassline; UK garage; R&B
- Labels: XL; Island; Dirtee Stank; Big Dirtee
- Formerly of: Roll Deep
- Website: dizzeerascal.co.uk

Dylan Kwabena Mills MBE (born 18 September 1984), known professionally as Dizzee Rascal, is a British rapper and MC. He is often credited as a pioneer of British hip hop and grime music and was ranked by Complex as one of the greatest British rappers of all time. His work has also incorporated elements of UK garage, bassline and R&B. Dizzee Rascal's music is also often credited with bringing UK rap into the mainstream and became the country's first rapper to achieve international recognition.

After signing with independent label XL Recordings in 2002, the rapper released his self-produced debut album Boy in da Corner in 2003. which received widespread critical acclaim and earned him the Mercury Prize in 2003, eventually being certified platinum by the British Phonographic Industry. It is often regarded as the best British hip hop album of all time. It was followed up with the albums Showtime (2004) and Maths + English (2007), which were also critically praised and were certified gold, both peaking within the top ten of the UK Albums Chart. His next album, Tongue n' Cheek (2009) saw a departure from grime for a more pop-oriented sound. It was certified double platinum and garnered four UK Singles Chart number one singles—"Dance wiv Me", "Bonkers", "Holiday" and "Dirtee Disco".

His fifth album, The Fifth (2013), continued his experimental commercial sound and although it received less favourable reviews than his previous albums, it still peaked in the top 10 of the UK Albums Chart. He returned to his grime roots with 2017's Raskit, and has since released E3 AF in 2020 and Don't Take It Personal in 2024. Throughout his career, Dizzee Rascal has worked with a number of notable artists including Arctic Monkeys, Calvin Harris, Florence + The Machine, Robbie Williams, Shakira, Ty Dolla Sign, UGK and will.i.am.

== Early life ==
Dylan Kwabena Mills was born on 18 September 1984 in Forest Gate, London. His Nigerian father died when he was two years old, and the circumstances of his father’s death are still unknown to him: "There’s obviously something that’s gone on that’s been kept from me, but it’s something my mum doesn’t like going into". He was raised on a council estate in Bow, in a single-parent family, by his Ghanaian mother Priscilla, about whom he says, "I had issues as a kid. I was violent and disruptive. The way my mum helped was by finding me a different school every time I got kicked out, always fighting to keep me in the school system."

He attended a series of schools in east London, including Langdon Park School, and was expelled from four of them, including St Paul's Way Community School. Reportedly, it was around this time that a teacher was the first to call him "Rascal". Cagey about exactly what Rascal's youthful "madnesses" entailed, in early interviews he mentioned fighting with teachers, stealing cars, and robbing pizza delivery men. In the fifth school, he was excluded from all classes except music. He also used to attend YATI (Young Actors Theatre Islington). One of his teachers at school was the comedian Shazia Mirza, who taught him science.

He began making music on the school's computer, encouraged by his music teacher Joseph Robson, and during the summer holidays attended a music workshop organised by Tower Hamlets Summer University, of which he is now a patron. He was a childhood friend of footballer Danny Shittu, whom he described as "almost like a big brother", and at whose house he made his first mixtapes and tracks. Unusually among his friends, he read the heavy metal magazine Kerrang! and was a fan of the grunge band Nirvana.

== Career ==
=== 2000–2003: Early career ===
Around the age of 14, Dizzee Rascal became an amateur drum and bass DJ, also rapping over tracks as customary in sound system culture, and making occasional appearances on local pirate radio stations. Aged sixteen, he self-produced his first single, "I Luv U". In 2002, he jointly formed the Roll Deep Crew, a 13-piece garage collective, with former school friends. He also signed a solo deal with the record label XL.

During his early career, Rascal worked with his mentor Wiley to create the still-unreleased song "We Ain't Having It" and rapped on some Sidewinder recordings. He made some instrumentals including "Go" and "Ho" and "Streetfighter". Rascal had an ongoing feud, from late 2003, with fellow underground grime artist Crazy Titch, which began when a fight broke out between the pair during a set on a guest show on the pirate radio station Deja Vu FM. The set, which features many seminal early grime artists, was filmed, and has accumulated over a million views on YouTube and resulted in the two exchanging diss tracks.

After winning a Sidewinder Award for Best Newcomer MC in 2002, Dizzee was a judge on the Sky1 show Must Be The Music.

In July 2002, Dizzee marked his first appearance on an official, commercially released song by appearing on the Roll Deep remix of The Streets' song "Let's Push Things Forward", which appeared as a b-side on the CD release of the single "Weak Become Heroes".

=== 2003–2004: Boy in da Corner ===
Dizzee's first solo album, Boy in da Corner, was released to universal critical acclaim in August 2003, entering the UK Albums Chart at No. 40. The album peaked at No. 23. In the same week the album was released, whilst performing with Roll Deep Crew in Cyprus, Dizzee was stabbed six times. Many tabloids suggested that this event was connected to an apparent feud between Dizzee and garage act So Solid Crew, and his pinching Lisa Maffia's buttocks. After Dizzee was hospitalised, So Solid Crew member "Megaman" – real name Dwayne Vincent – was questioned about the incident, but was released by Cypriot police.

Sittin' here
Sample of "Sittin' here."

Following the success of single "I Luv U" and the album, the second single from Boy in da Corner was "Fix Up, Look Sharp". The single, released in August 2003, gave Dizzee his first UK Top 20 single and also became the biggest hit from his debut album. In September, Dizzee was awarded the prestigious Mercury Prize for the best album of 2003. He was the youngest person at 19 years old to do so and the second rapper, after Ms. Dynamite the previous year. The album was also chosen as the No. 1 album of the year by Planet Sound, and as one of the top 50 albums of the year by Rolling Stone. His unique style, as "words pour out at a high pitch and pace, as if syllables are the only thing that can hold back a scream", have given him a sound that hip hop heads can embrace as something new and original in the hip hop scene. Later in the year he collaborated with the Basement Jaxx on their third album, Kish Kash on the track "Lucky Star". The track was released as a single in November 2003 and gave Dizzee his third top 30 hit. The third and final single, taken from his debut album, was "Jus' a Rascal", which became his fourth top 30 success. The song was also featured in the film Kidulthood released in 2006.

"Jezebel" was not a single from the album, but was well received, gaining exposure and popularity on the underground scene. The song told the tale of a young London girl, who through years of going to parties, getting drunk, doing drugs and having sex earned herself the title Jezebel. He made his US concert debut on 7 February 2004 at Volume in Williamsburg, Brooklyn.

=== 2004–2007: Showtime ===
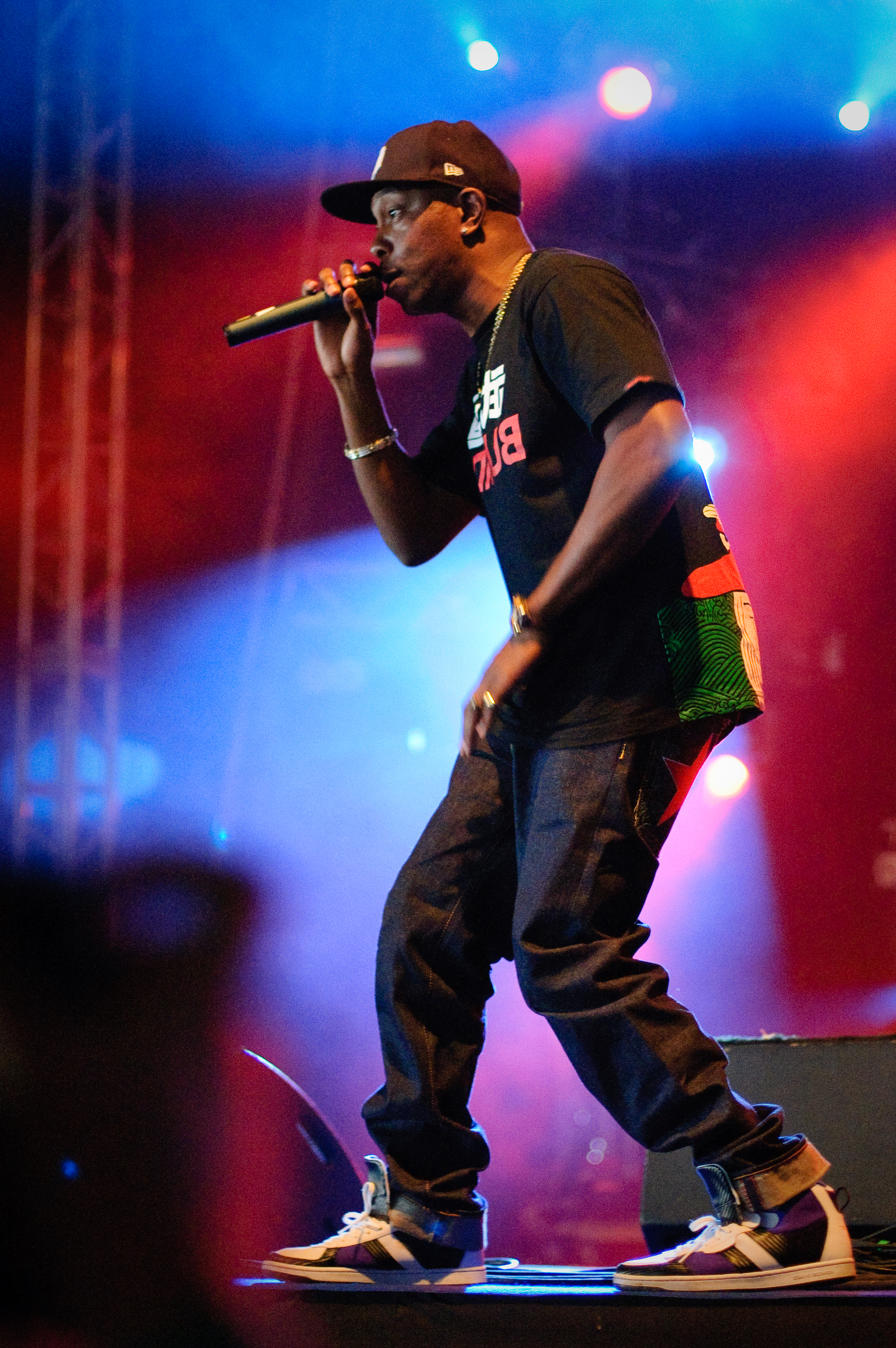
Dizzee Rascal performing at the 2009 Ilosaarirock festival

In 2004, Dizzee Rascal won the NME Award for Innovation. His second album, Showtime, was released in September of the same year, eclipsing the peak of his debut album by entering the UK Albums Chart at No. 8. The first single from the album, released two weeks earlier in August 2004, was titled "Stand Up Tall"; it was written and produced by grime producer DJ Youngstar of Pulse-X. The title track was featured on the soundtrack for the first FIFA Street video game.

The second single "Dream", another top 20 hit, was released in November 2004. It sampled (and used the chorus of) Captain Sensible's song "Happy Talk", originally from the makers of Rodgers and Hammerstein musical South Pacific. The "Dream" music video consisted of a mock 1950s style children's marionette show depicting scenes corresponding to the lyrics about Dizzee's youth: street culture, crime, single teenage mothers, pirate radio and garage clubs.

Later in 2004, Dizzee Rascal was part of Band Aid 20, a group of British musicians who re-recorded "Do They Know It's Christmas?" He did not sing in the song; rather, he rapped two lines of it ("Spare a thought this yuletide for the deprived, if the table was turned would you survive?" and "You ain't gotta feel guilt just selfless, give a little help to the helpless"). Dizzee Rascal was the first person to add to the song since the original was released; this would mark the first time that Dizzee reached the number one spot in the UK Singles Chart, albeit as part of the ensemble.

In 2004, Dizzee Rascal made an international endorsement deal with urban brand Eckō Unltd. and designed his own shoe with Nike in 2005.

In March 2005, the double A-side single "Off 2 Work" / "Graftin'" was released. "Graftin'" was the third and final single from the Showtime album, whilst "Off 2 Work" was a new track that did not appear on either of his albums. The accompanying music video featured Rascal in various ordinary workplace situations (as a policeman, a fast food vendor, a businessman, etc.) and as Prime Minister, announcing his engagement to Cherie Blair. It would prove to be Dizzee's lowest charting single to date, peaking at No. 44.

=== 2007–2009: Maths + English ===
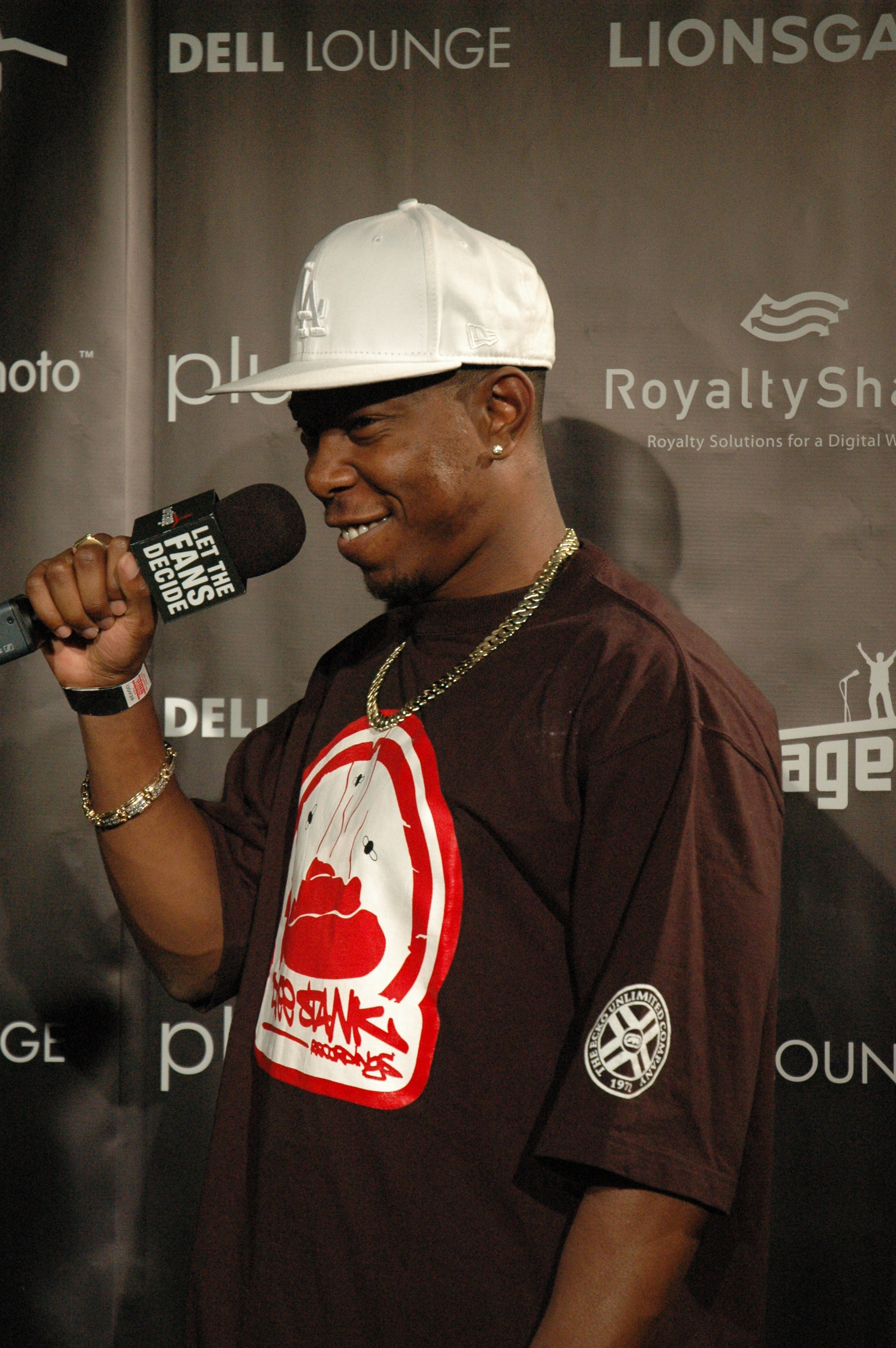
Rascal in 2008

Dizzee's third album, Maths + English, was released on 4 June 2007. He stated in an interview before the album's release that "Maths" refers to producing, in terms of beats, deals and money and "English" to writing lyrics. The first single off this album, "Sirens", was released on 21 May.

The album was one of the 12 nominees for the 2007 Mercury Prize, which ultimately went to Klaxons' album Myths of the Near Future. During the year, Dizzee worked with cross-genre artist Beck on a remix of the song "Hell Yes", and provided guest vocals on an Arctic Monkeys track, the B-Side to their single "Brianstorm" named "Temptation Greets You Like Your Naughty Friend". Dizzee's version of the same song was featured as "Temptation" on his third album.

The official US album was released on 29 April 2008; it contained two tracks not on the European release, but it did not include the track "Pussyole'". It was Dizzee's first album to be released under the Definitive Jux label.

In 2008, Rascal recorded a song for suicide charity CALM; the song "Dean" was about a friend of Dizzee's who took his own life. In December of that year, he was arrested following an alleged incident involving a baseball bat in southeast London. He was released on bail to return to a police station later in December.

=== 2009–2012: Tongue n' Cheek ===
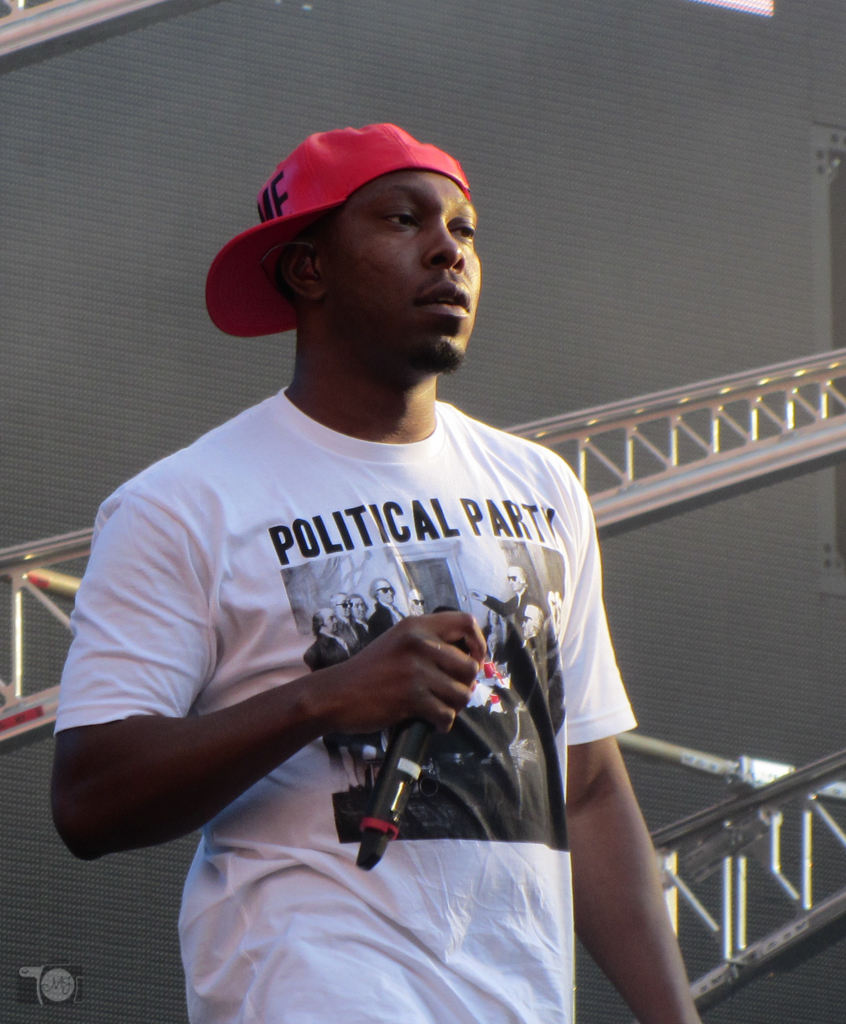
Dizzee Rascal performing with Muse on their Stadium Tour in 2013

Dizzee Rascal released his fourth studio album, Tongue n' Cheek, on 21 September 2009. It included his four number-one hits "Dance wiv Me", "Bonkers" (with Armand Van Helden), "Holiday" and "Dirtee Disco". Its release was announced on Friday Night with Jonathan Ross, where Dizzee Rascal revealed some details about the album, including track information and production. In a collaboration track with Chase & Status titled "Heavy", Dizzee Rascal said, "Grime had a little time without me still no grime without me, No life without me, no Risky Roadz, no Grime Daily" seemingly seeking to create the impression that grime had petered out since he left the scene. On 23 May 2008, Calvin Harris, whom he collaborated with on the number-one hit "Dance Wiv Me", revealed on his Twitter that he was producing a Dizzee track; at the Evolution Festival in Newcastle, and when on tour supporting The Prodigy, he confirmed that two new singles called "Road Rage" and "Dirtee Cash", both of which featured on the album, would be released. "Dirtee Cash" peaked at No. 10 and Road Rage was never released as a single.

At the 30th annual Brit Awards, Dizzee Rascal won the award for Best British Male. He later performed a mash-up entitled "You Got the Dirtee Love" with Florence and the Machine. This collaboration was released as a charity single the following day and peaked at number 2 in the UK charts.

On 31 May 2010 Dizzee re-released the album Tongue n' Cheek with a few new tracks including "Dirtee Disco", which was released on 24 May 2010. The track went to number 1 on the UK Singles Chart.

In August 2010, it was revealed that he was to collaborate with Colombian popstar Shakira on the English version of "Loca", the lead single of her album Sale el Sol. He stated that "I know it sounds a bit mad now, but you'll see it and see what's going on, it's me doing something different man, on a merengue tip". On the week of 14 October 2010, Dizzee made his first appearance on the US Billboard Hot 100 after the song peaked number 32.

On 6 February 2011, it was announced Dizzee would support the Red Hot Chili Peppers at their Knebworth House show in the summer.

=== 2012–2017: DirteeTV.com and The Fifth ===
On New Year's Day 2011, Dizzee Rascal released DirteeTV.com alongside the Newham Generals, D Double E and Footsie. The 25-track mixtape was released as a free download, and included features from fellow rappers JME, Kano, Scrufizzer, Example, Rapid, Chronik, Hyper and Smurfie Syco. The mixtape featured new and old tracks by Dizzee Rascal.

In 2012 he was also expected to have a collaboration with Snoop Dogg on either his new album or Snoop Dogg's new album Reincarnated. His first collaboration with DJ Fresh, "The Power" was the third single from Fresh's third studio album, released in September 2012. Dizzee performed during the opening ceremony of the 2012 London Olympics.

On Calvin Harris's third studio album, 18 Months, Dizzee Rascal paired up with Harris and Dillon Francis to create the track "Here 2 China". Dizzee Rascal's album The Fifth was released in 2013. The lead single was "Goin' Crazy" featuring Robbie Williams.

=== 2016–present: Raskit, E3 AF, and Don't Take It Personal ===
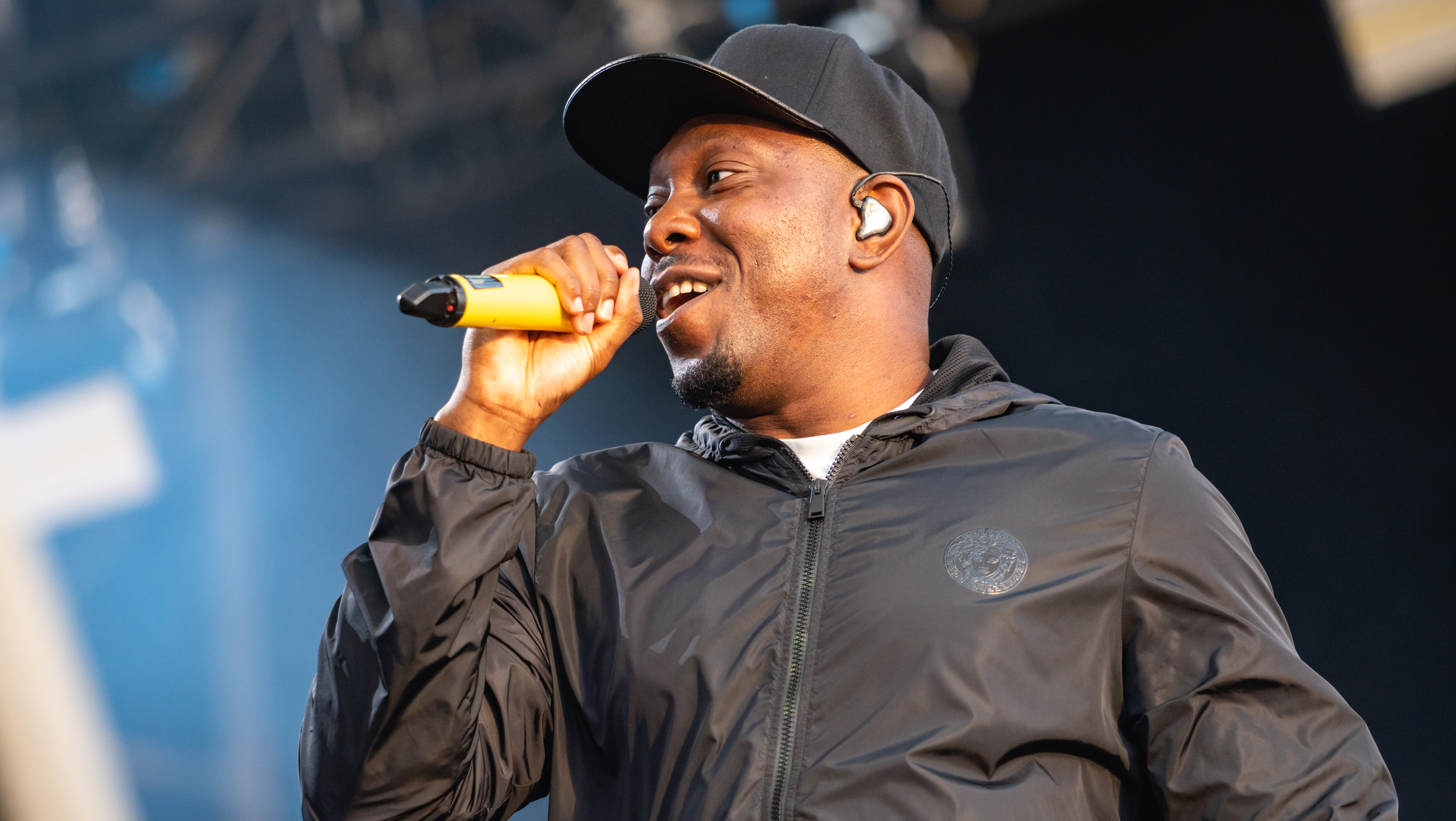
Dizzee Rascal performing in Cornwall in 2021

In June 2016, Dizzee Rascal collaborated with Calvin Harris for the third time on the single "Hype", which reached number 34 on the UK charts. A year later, he released the single "Space" with a livestreamed teaser trailer and announced his sixth studio album, titled Raskit, which was released on 21 July 2017, peaking at number 10 on the UK albums chart. Later that year, he collaborated with French rapper Orelsan on the song "Zone" (also featuring Nekfeu).

Dizzee Rascal released an EP titled Don't Gas Me in September 2018. The EP also marked the first time Dizzee and Skepta worked on a track together, releasing Money Right which peaked at number 68 on the UK singles chart. He also began appearing in Ladbrokes adverts on television, with "Bonkers" playing in the background.

In August 2020 Dizzee Rascal announced his seventh studio album, titled E3 AF, which was then released on 30 October 2020. The album peaked at number 13 on the UK albums chart. In November 2023, he released a single titled "How Did I Get So Calm" from his forthcoming eighth studio album "Don't Take It Personal", which released on 9 February 2024.

== Music and style ==
When starting to make music in his teenage years, Dizzee Rascal "learned to rap fast" over drum and bass tracks with 170-180 bpm, in contrast to the slower tempos of UK Garage. He also recalls being influenced by crunk (Three 6 Mafia, Lil Jon), grunge music, Black Sabbath and by Timbaland's work around that time.

Dizzee Rascal once told author Ben Thompson in an interview with The Observer magazine that "everything I do is for the music – I want to master it like Bruce Lee mastered martial arts".

Dizzee Rascal worked closely with his mentor Wiley, who created one of the first grime tracks, called "Eskimo". In 2005, music critic Sasha Frere-Jones observed that despite Dizzee's large mainstream exposure, grime still was not having a commercial breakthrough in the US, although it was "becoming familiar". His DJ, DJ Semtex, said in 2004, "the biggest conflict I have is with major labels because they still don't get it". Andy Bennett and Jon Stratton highlight in the book Britpop and the English Music Tradition (2010) how Dizzee Rascal alongside Sway and M.I.A. created music that explored new soundscapes with new technologies, with lyrics expressing anger at Britain's "racialized" subordination of minority groups and that the innovation that generates new musical forms like grime and dubstep that are, inevitably, politically engaged. The chart success of grime-influenced artists like him is heralded as a signal in the way that white Britons are adapting to a new multicultural and plural musical mix in contrast to previous bands.

== Other interests ==
=== Dirtee Stank ===
The first white label release of "I Luv U" was made on Rascal's own label, Dirtee Stank, released when he was 16, although both of his albums and their subsequent singles have been released under XL Recordings. It was not until 30 September 2005, that Dizzee Rascal 'revived' the label and made his first signings, Klass A and Newham Generals.

The label was formed and is owned by Dizzee Rascal, and is co-run by Dizzee's manager, Cage, label manager, Laurence Ezra, tour manager Paddy Stewart and executive producer Teriy Keys. According to Cage, Dirtee Stank exists to promote gifted artists with "social problems" that might scare off other labels. "People who, through the conditions they live in, might not be stable."

The single "Dance Wiv Me", featuring Calvin Harris and Chrome, was released through the label on 7 July 2008; the track became Jo Whiley's Pet Sound for the Week beginning 2 June 2008, thus gaining a large amount of radio airtime. The single charted at Number 1 on download sales alone, a week before its physical release. Dizzee's next two singles, "Bonkers" and "Holiday", were also released under the record label, and these two again charted at Number 1. Dizzee then released his 4th album on the label (Tongue N' Cheek) which along with three number ones spawned the top 10 hit Dirtee Cash.

As of August 2011, the Newham Generals (D Double E & Footsie), Smurfie Syco and Pepper are signed to the label. In 2014, Merky ACE was added to the Dirtee Stank line up.

=== Political views ===
During the 2008 US presidential elections, Dizzee gave a live interview to Newsnight presenter Jeremy Paxman, in which he described Barack Obama as "an immediate symbol of unity". Addressed by Paxman as "Mr Rascal" at one point, he said he felt that hip-hop played an important part in encouraging young voters and humorously suggested that he could well one day become prime minister.

== Personal life ==
In March 2005, Dizzee Rascal was arrested for allegedly carrying an illegal weapon after a search during a car stop in east London; he was found to be in possession of pepper spray. The driver of the car was also arrested after being found in possession of pepper spray, an ASP baton and cannabis.

In February 2008, Dizzee Rascal's ex-girlfriend, model Kaya Bousquet, whom he had dated for two years, died in a high-speed crash on the M1 motorway. Later that year in December he was arrested and held on suspicion of possessing an offensive weapon after allegedly approaching a motorist with a baseball bat in a road rage incident at Sevenoaks Way, Orpington. This put an end to Rascal’s passionate hobby for clay pigeon shooting which he cultivated following the 2017 Electric Fields Festival at Drumlanrig Castle in Dumfries and Galloway, Scotland.

Dizzee Rascal said in 2010 that he planned not to use drugs or alcohol at all in the future. He told The Independent, "I'm not having any alcohol. No weed. I'm not doing anything – except some boxing to release energy." In 2011, however, when asked what his favourite drink was during an interview with GQ, he answered "Do I drink [alcohol] now? To be honest with you, the whole living clean vibe didn't last long. My biggest mistake was probably saying it in an interview, to be fair. I tried living mad clean – but I like partying as much as anyone else."

In November 2013, Rascal received an honorary Doctorate of the Arts from the University of East London. He was appointed a Member of the Order of the British Empire (MBE) in the 2020 Birthday Honours for services to music.

On 7 March 2022, Dizzee Rascal was convicted of assaulting his former partner Cassandra Jones, with whom he has a daughter and a son, at a property in Streatham on 8 June 2021, after a 'chaotic argument'. Upon leaving court, he knocked a camera from a Press Association photographer's hands and threw it across the street. He received a community order, which included a 24-week curfew, as well as a restraining order prohibiting him from contacting Jones for a period of 12 months. An appeal against his conviction was dismissed in January 2023.

== Discography ==
- Boy in da Corner (2003)
- Showtime (2004)
- Maths + English (2007)
- Tongue n' Cheek (2009)
- The Fifth (2013)
- Raskit (2017)
- E3 AF (2020)
- Don't Take It Personal (2024)
- We Want Bass (2026)

== Awards and nominations ==
| Year | Award | Category | Nominee/work | Result | Ref. |
|---|---|---|---|---|---|
| 2003 | BT Digital Music Awards | Best Use of Mobile | Boy in da Corner | Won | |
| 2003 | Mercury Prize | Best Album of the Year | Boy in da Corner | Won | |
| 2003 | Urban Music Awards | Best Newcomer | Himself | Won | |
| 2003 | MOBO Awards | Best Newcomer | Himself | Nominated | |
| 2003 | MOBO Awards | Best Garage Act | Himself | Nominated | |
| 2004 | NME Awards | Innovation | Himself | Won | |
| 2004 | MOBO Awards | UK Act of the Year | Himself | Won | |
| 2004 | Brit Awards | Best British Breakthrough Act | Himself | Nominated | |
| 2004 | Brit Awards | Best British Male | Himself | Nominated | |
| 2004 | Brit Awards | Best British Urban Act | Himself | Nominated | |
| 2004 | Ivor Novello Awards | Best Contemporary Song | "Jus' a Rascal" | Nominated | |
| 2004 | Q Awards | Best Album | Showtime | Nominated | |
| 2005 | Brit Awards | Best British Urban Act | Himself | Nominated | |
| 2005 | PLUG Independent Music Awards | Album of the Year | Boy in da Corner | Nominated | |
| 2005 | PLUG Independent Music Awards | Hip-Hop Album of the Year | Boy in da Corner | Nominated | |
| 2005 | PLUG Independent Music Awards | Artist of the Year | Himself | Nominated | |
| 2005 | PLUG Independent Music Awards | New Artist of the Year | Himself | Nominated | |
| 2005 | PLUG Independent Music Awards | Male Artist of the Year | Himself | Nominated | |
| 2006 | Brit Awards | Best British Urban Act | Himself | Nominated | |
| 2007 | MOBO Awards | Best UK Male | Himself | Won | |
| 2007 | MOBO Awards | Best Hip-Hop Act | Himself | Nominated | |
| 2007 | MOBO Awards | Best Single | "Sirens" | Nominated | |
| 2007 | MOBO Awards | Best Video | "Sirens" | Nominated | |
| 2007 | Antville Music Video Awards | Best Narrative Video | "Sirens" | Won | |
| 2007 | Mercury Prize | Best Album of the Year | Maths + English | Nominated | |
| 2008 | MOBO Awards | Best UK Male | Himself | Won | |
| 2008 | MOBO Awards | Best Hip-Hop Act | Himself | Nominated | |
| 2008 | MOBO Awards | Best Single | "Dance wiv Me" (with Calvin Harris) | Nominated | |
| 2008 | Popjustice £20 Music Prize | Best British Pop Single | "Dance wiv Me" (with Calvin Harris) | Nominated | |
| 2008 | Rober Awards Music Prize | Best Music Video | "Toe Jam" (with The BPA & David Byrne) | Nominated | |
| 2008 | UK Music Video Awards | Best Dance Video | "Toe Jam" (with The BPA & David Byrne) | Nominated | |
| 2008 | UK Music Video Awards | Best Urban Video | "Sirens" | Nominated | |
| 2009 | Urban Music Awards | Best Male | Himself | Won | |
| 2009 | MOBO Awards | Best UK Act | Himself | Nominated | |
| 2009 | MOBO Awards | Best Hip-Hop Act | Himself | Nominated | |
| 2009 | MOBO Awards | Best Video | "Bonkers" | Nominated | |
| 2009 | Brit Awards | Best British Single of the Year | "Dance wiv Me" (with Calvin Harris) | Eliminated | |
| 2009 | Ivor Novello Awards | Best Contemporary Song | "Dance wiv Me" (with Calvin Harris) | Nominated | |
| 2009 | MTV Video Music Awards Japan | Best Dance Video | "Toe Jam" (with The BPA & David Byrne) | Nominated | |
| 2009 | Q Awards | Best Video | "Holiday" | Nominated | |
| 2009 | Q Awards | Best Track | "Bonkers" | Nominated | |
| 2009 | The Record of the Year | Record of the Year | "Bonkers" | Nominated | |
| 2009 | UK Music Video Awards | Best Dance Video | "Bonkers" | Nominated | |
| 2010 | BT Digital Music Awards | Best Independent Artist | Himself | Won | |
| 2010 | BT Digital Music Awards | Best Male Artist | Himself | Nominated | |
| 2010 | MOBO Awards | Best UK Act | Himself | Nominated | |
| 2010 | MOBO Awards | Best Video | "Dirtee Disco" | Nominated | |
| 2010 | MOBO Awards | Best Album | Tongue N' Cheek | Nominated | |
| 2010 | Mercury Prize | Best Album of the Year | Tongue N' Cheek | Nominated | |
| 2010 | UK Music Video Awards | Best Music Advertisement – Television or Online | Tongue N' Cheek | Won | |
| 2010 | Music Producers Guild Awards | UK Album of the Year | Tongue N' Cheek | Won | |
| 2010 | Ivor Novello Awards | Album Award | Tongue N' Cheek | Nominated | |
| 2010 | Ivor Novello Awards | Best Contemporary Song | "Bonkers" | Nominated | |
| 2010 | Brit Awards | Best British Album of the Year | Himself | Nominated | |
| 2010 | Brit Awards | Best British Male Solo Artist | Himself | Won | |
| 2010 | BET Awards | Best International Act | Himself | Won | |
| 2010 | Q Awards | Best Male Artist | Himself | Nominated | |
| 2011 | Ivor Novello Awards | The Ivors Inspiration Award | Himself | Won | |
| 2012 | Q Awards | Best Solo Artist | Himself | Nominated | |
| 2013 | Antville Music Video Awards | Best Commissioning Artist | Himself | Nominated | |
| 2013 | Camerimage | Best Music Video | "Bassline Junkie" | Nominated | |
| 2013 | MOBO Awards | Best Video | "Bassline Junkie" | Nominated | |
| 2013 | UK Music Video Awards | Best Urban Video – UK | "Bassline Junkie" | Nominated | |
| 2013 | UK Music Video Awards | Best Urban Video – UK | "I Don't Need a Reason" | Nominated | |
| 2013 | UK Music Video Awards | Best Art Direction & Design in a Video | "Goin' Crazy" (with Robbie Williams) | Nominated | |
| 2013 | UK Music Video Awards | Best Pop Video – UK | "Goin' Crazy" (with Robbie Williams) | Nominated | |
| 2013 | UK Music Video Awards | Best Pop Video – UK | "Wild" (with Jessie J & Big Sean) | Nominated | |
| 2013 | UK Music Video Awards | Best Editing in a Video | "Wild" (with Jessie J & Big Sean) | Nominated | |
| 2014 | BET Awards | Best International Act: UK | Himself | Nominated | |
| 2014 | Hungarian Music Awards | Rap/Hip-Hop Album of the Year | The Fifth | Won | |
| 2015 | UK Music Video Awards | Best Urban Video – UK | "Couple of Stacks" | Nominated | |
| 2015 | UK Music Video Awards | Best Urban Video – UK | "Pagans" | Nominated | |
| 2018 | Berlin Music Video Awards | Best Narrative | "Bop N' Keep It Dippin" | Nominated | |
| 2018 | UK Music Video Awards | Best Urban Video – UK | "Bop N' Keep It Dippin" | Nominated | |
| 2018 | UK Music Video Awards | Best Styling in a Video | "Bop N' Keep It Dippin" | Nominated | |
| 2018 | Webby Awards | Best Music Video | "Bop N' Keep It Dippin" | Won | |
| 2019 | Berlin Music Video Awards | Best Narrative | "Money Right" (with Skepta) | Nominated | |
| 2019 | D&AD Awards | Best Production Design | "Money Right" (with Skepta) | Wood Pencil | |
| 2019 | UK Music Video Awards | Best Production Design in a Video | "Money Right" (with Skepta) | Nominated | |
| 2019 | Webby Awards | Best Music Video | "Money Right" (with Skepta) | Won | |
| 2023 | The National Film Awards | Best Supporting Actor in a TV Series | "Jungle" | Won | |

== Bibliography ==
- Sounds Like London: 100 Years of Black Music in the Capital, 2013. (Contributor)
