= List of UK top-ten singles in 2013 =

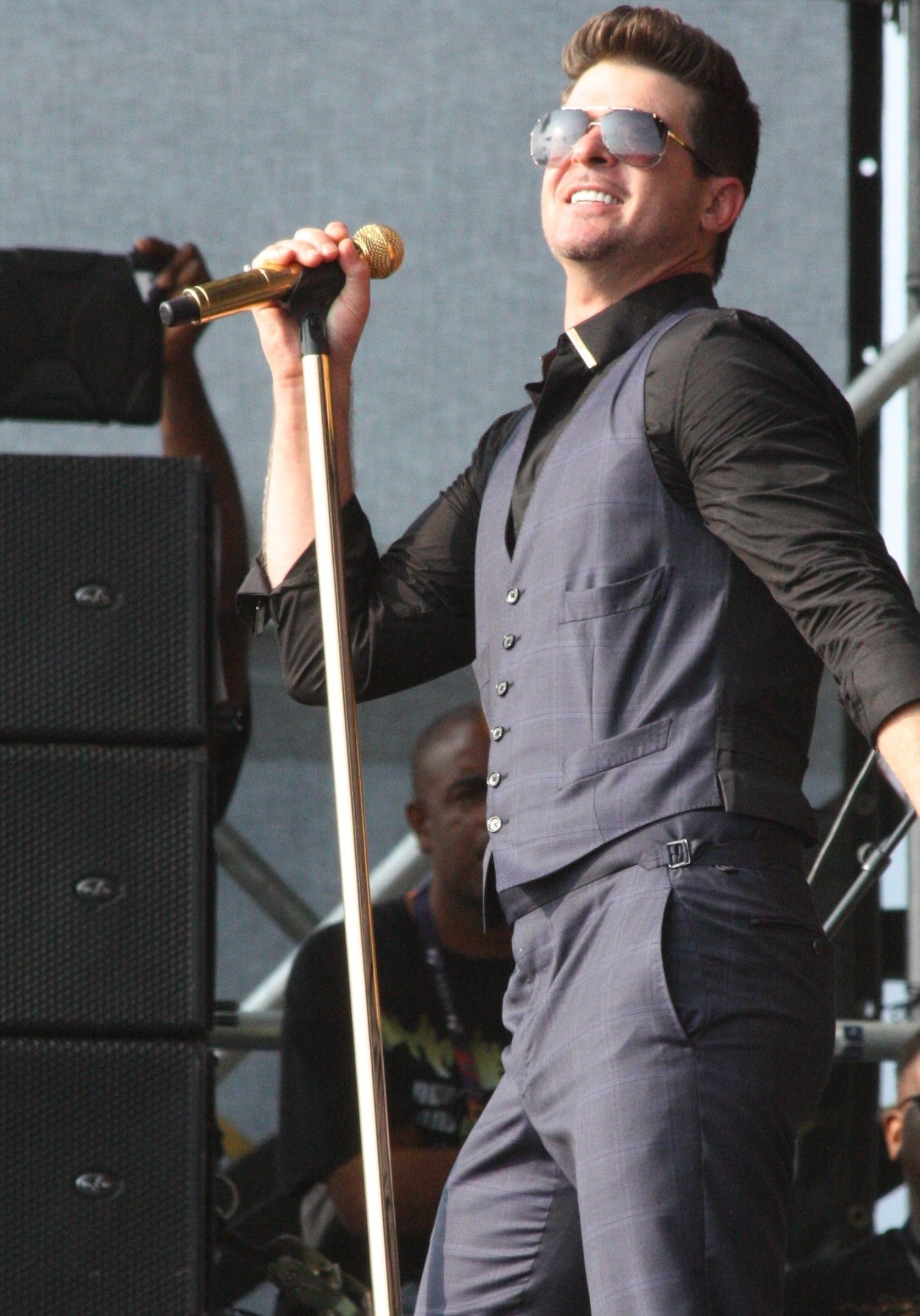
Robin Thicke teamed up with T.I. and Pharrell Williams to record "Blurred Lines", which became the UK's best-selling single of 2013, topping the charts for five weeks and spending 14 weeks inside the top 10.

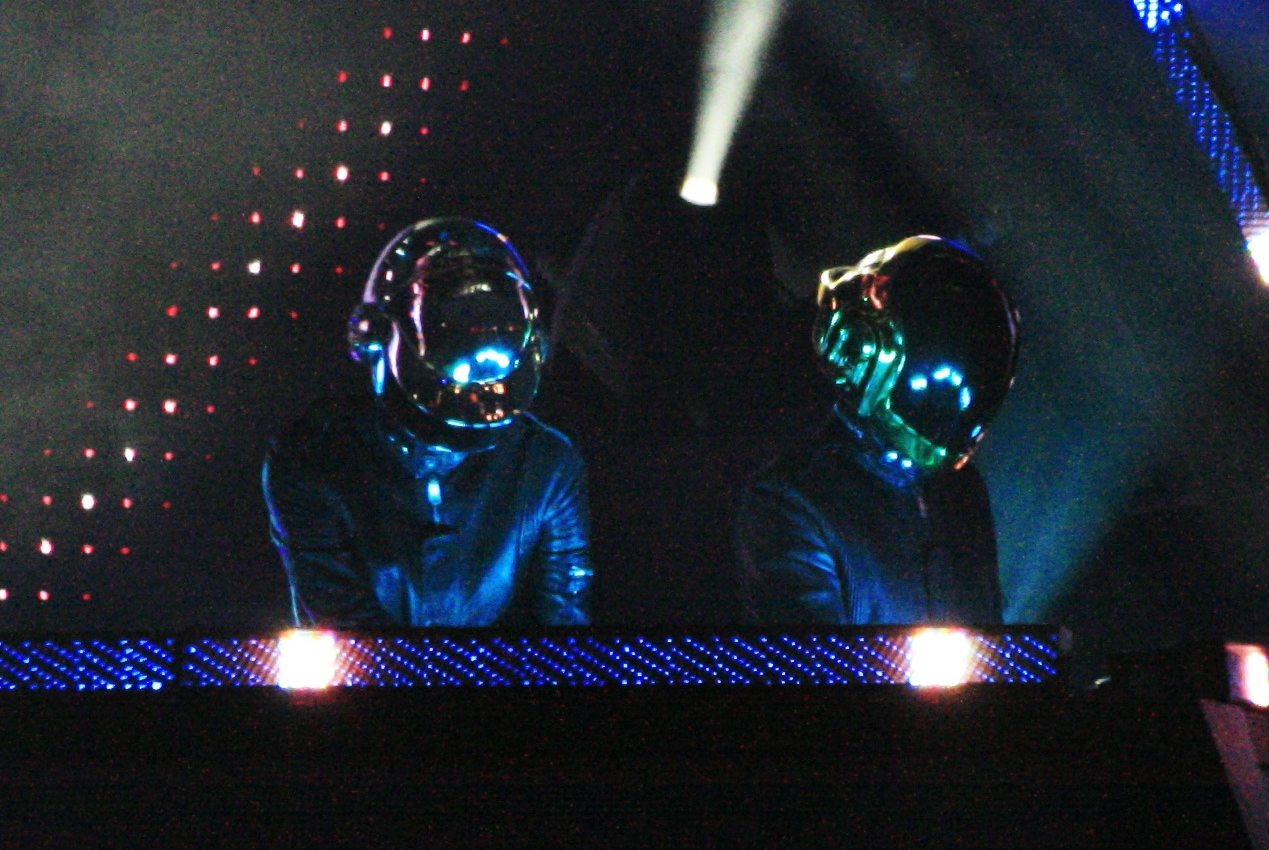
French electronic music duo Daft Punk had the year's second best selling single with "Get Lucky", which also featured vocals from Pharrell Williams. It spent four weeks at number-one and lasted 14 weeks in the top 10.

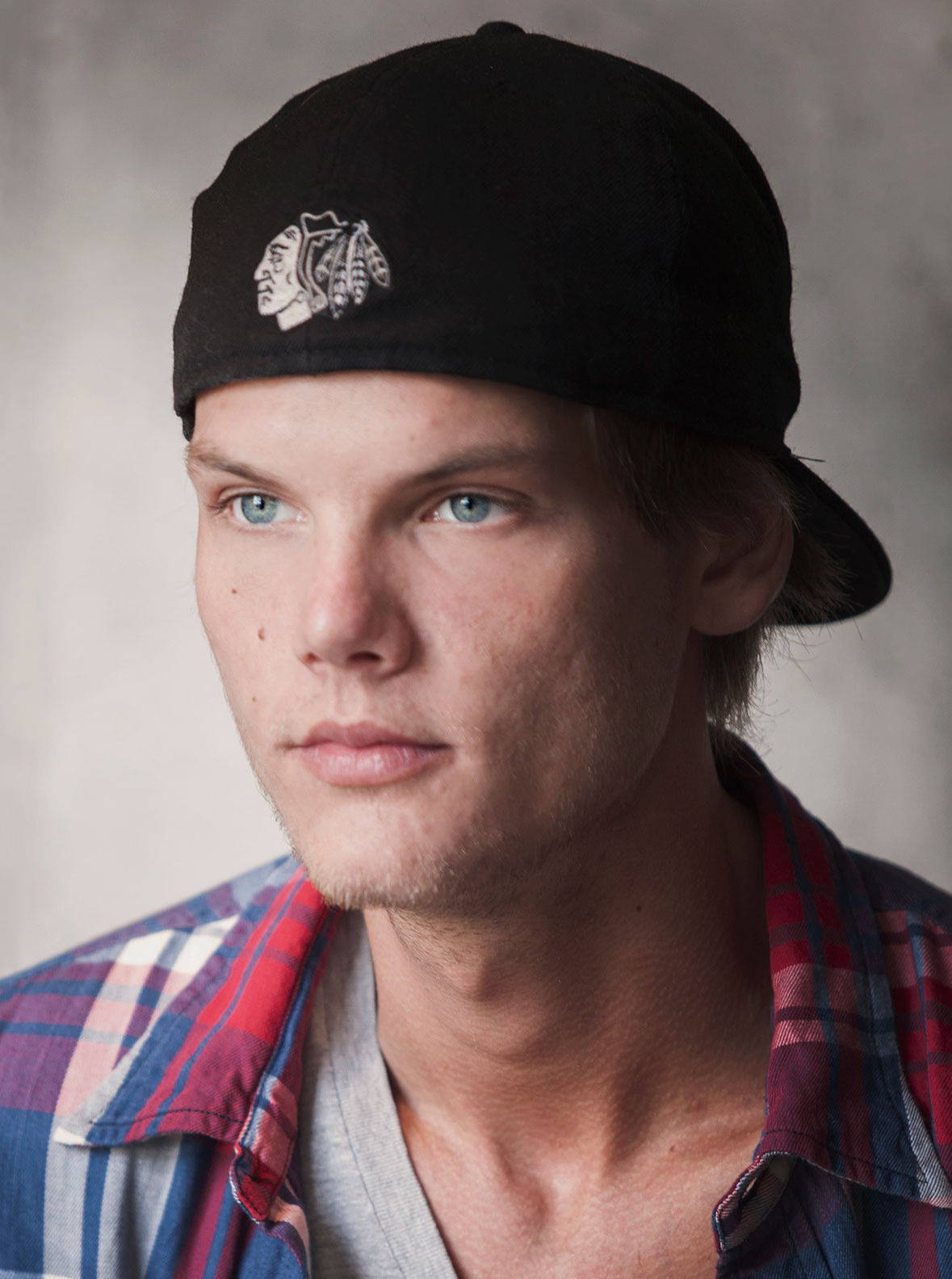
Swedish DJ Avicii had four singles in the top 10 during 2013, including two number-ones. "I Could Be the One", which spent a week at number-one in February, was a collaboration with Nicky Romero. "Wake Me Up", which featured uncredited vocals from Aloe Blacc, became the year's third best selling single, spending three weeks at number-one and lasting 11 weeks in the top 10.

The UK Singles Chart is one of many music charts compiled by the Official Charts Company that calculates the best-selling singles of the week in the United Kingdom. Since 2004 the chart has been based on the sales of both physical singles and digital downloads, with airplay figures excluded from the official chart. This list shows singles that peaked in the Top 10 of the UK Singles Chart during 2013, as well as singles which peaked in 2012 and 2014 but were in the top 10 in 2013. The entry date is when the single appeared in the top 10 for the first time (week ending, as published by the Official Charts Company, which is six days after the chart is announced).

One-hundred and fifty-two singles were in the top ten in 2013. Ten singles from 2012 remained in the top 10 for several weeks at the beginning of the year, "Happy" by Pharrell Williams and "Trumpets" by Jason Derulo were released in 2013 but did not reach their peak until 2014. "Scream & Shout" by Britney Spears & will.i.am and "I Knew You Were Trouble" by Taylor Swift were the singles from 2012 to reach their peak in 2013. Forty-seven artists scored multiple entries in the top 10 in 2013. Bastille, John Newman, Macklemore & Ryan Lewis, Union J and The Vamps were among the many artists who achieved their first UK charting top 10 single in 2013.

"Impossible" by British singer-songwriter and X Factor series 9 winner James Arthur returned to number-one for the first two weeks of 2013, giving the single a total of three weeks on top of the chart. It had vacated the top spot for one week as The Justice Collective secured the 2012 Christmas number-one with "He Ain't Heavy, He's My Brother", a charity single in aid of the Hillsborough Disaster. The first new number-one single of the year was "Scream & Shout" by American singers Britney Spears & will.i.am. Overall, thirty different singles peaked at number-one in 2013, with Avicii, Miley Cyrus and Pharrell Williams (2) having the joint most singles hit that position.

== Background ==
=== Multiple entries ===
One-hundred and fifty-two singles charted in the top 10 in 2013, with one-hundred and forty singles reaching their peak this year.

Forty-seven artists scored multiple entries in the top 10 in 2013. Scottish DJ and producer Calvin Harris had the most top ten singles in 2013 with five. "Under Control" featuring Alesso and Hurts was at number-one for a week and remained in the top ten for one more week. Other entries included "Thinking About You" featuring Ayah Marar (number 8), "I Need Your Love" featuring Ellie Goulding (4), "Drinking from the Bottle" featuring Tinie Tempah (5) and a remix of Fatboy Slim's "Eat, Sleep, Rave, Repeat which reached number 3. Boyband One Direction, Swedish DJ Avicii, rappers Dizzee Rascal and Eminem and will.i.am from the Black Eyed Peas all had four top ten singles in 2013.

=== Chart debuts ===
Sixty-five artists achieved their first top 10 single in 2013, either as a lead or featured artist. Of these, five went on to record another hit single that year: Bastille, Breach, Demi Lovato, Disclosure and Union J. 2 Chainz and Macklemore & Ryan Lewis had two other entries in their breakthrough year.

The following table (collapsed on desktop site) does not include acts who had previously charted as part of a group and secured their first top 10 solo single.

Artist	Number of top 10s	First entry	Chart position	Other entries
TJR	1	"Don't Stop the Party"	7	—
Bingo Players	1	"Get Up (Rattle)"	1	—
Macklemore & Ryan Lewis	3	"Thrift Shop"	1	"Can't Hold Us" (3), "Same Love" (6)
Wanz	1	"Thrift Shop"	1	—
Diane Birch	1	"Rewind"	10	—
Disclosure	2	"White Noise"	2	"You & Me" (10)
AlunaGeorge	1	"White Noise"	2	—
Baauer	1	"Harlem Shake"	3	—
Ben Howard	1	"Only Love"	9	—
Bastille	2	"Pompeii"	2	"Of the Night" (2)
Bridgit Mendler	1	"Ready or Not"	7	—
Charlie Brown	1	"On My Way"	7	—
Duke Dumont	1	"Need U (100%)"	1	—
A*M*E	1	"Need U (100%)"	1	—
The Wizard of Oz film cast	1	"Ding-Dong! The Witch Is Dead"	2	—
Ella Eyre	1	"Waiting All Night"	1	—
Ray Dalton	1	"Can't Hold Us"	3	—
Loveable Rogues	1	"What a Night"	9	—
Passenger	1	"Let Her Go"	2	—
Chris Malinchak	1	"So Good to Me"	2	—
Armin van Buuren	1	"This Is What It Feels Like"	6	—
Trevor Guthrie	1	"This Is What It Feels Like"	6	—
Demi Lovato	2	"Heart Attack"	3	"Skyscraper" (7)
Sub Focus	1	"Endorphins"	7	—
Sam Smith	1	"La La La"	1	—
2 Chainz	3	"We Own It (Fast & Furious)"	6	"Trampoline" (3), "Talk Dirty" (1)
Robin Thicke	1	"Blurred Lines"	1	—
Big Sean	1	"Wild"	5	—
Union J	2	"Carry You"	6	"Beautiful Life" (8)
Fuse ODG	1	"Antenna"	7	—
Leah McFall	1	"I Will Survive"	8	—
Tom Odell	1	"Another Love"	10	—
Icona Pop	1	"I Love It"	1	—
Charli XCX	1	"I Love It"	1	—
Gabz	1	"Lighters (The One)"	6	—
Louis M^ttrs	1	"Lost & Not Found"	9	—
Tommy Trash	1	"Reload"	7	—
Breach	2	"Jack"	7	"Everything You Never Had (We Had It All)" (9)
Cedric Gervais	1	"Summertime Sadness"	4	—
Ayah Marar	1	"Thinking About You"	8	—
Klangkarussell	1	"Sonnentanz (Sun Don't Shine)"	3	—
Will Heard	1	"Sonnentanz (Sun Don't Shine)"	3	—
Diplo	1	"Earthquake"	4	—
Dominique Young Unique	1	"Earthquake"	4	—
Majid Jordan	1	"Hold On, We're Going Home"	4	—
Mary Lambert	1	"Same Love"	6	—
Ben Pearce	1	"What I Might Do"	7	—
The Vamps	1	"Can We Dance"	2	—
Moko	1	"Count on Me"	5	—
Wilkinson	1	"Afterglow"	8	—
Iggy Azalea	1	"Change Your Life"	10	—
Lorde	1	"Royals"	1	—
Showtek	1	"Booyah"	3	—
We Are Loud!	1	"Booyah"	3	—
Sonny Wilson	1	"Booyah"	3	—
Riva Star	1	"Eat, Sleep, Rave, Repeat"	3	—
Beardyman	1	"Eat, Sleep, Rave, Repeat"	3	—
Storm Queen	1	"Look Right Through (MK Remix)"	1	—
MK	1	"Look Right Through (MK Remix)"	1	—
Martin Garrix	1	"Animals"	1	—
Alesso	1	"Under Control"	1	—
Hurts	1	"Under Control"	1	—
Andreya Triana	1	"Everything You Never Had (We Had It All)"	9	—
Sam Bailey	1	"Skyscraper"	1	—
AC/DC	1	"Highway to Hell"	4	—

Notes

Nate Ruess made his chart debut with his band Fun in 2012 with the song "We Are Young" but he had his first individual credit in 2013 featuring on Pink's "Just Give Me a Reason. Sebastian Ingrosso had previous hit singles in the supergroup Swedish House Mafia ("One (Your Name)", "Miami 2 Ibiza", "Save the World", "Antidote" and "Don't You Worry Child") but "Reload" was his first top 10 in his own right.

Selena Gomez made her chart debut with her band Selena Gomez & the Scene in 2010 with the song "Naturally" but "Come & Get It" was her first solo top 10 single. Although "We Can't Stop" was Miley Cyrus's first official top 10 single, she was part of the Helping Haiti charity single "Everybody Hurts" in 2010, which reached number-one.

=== Songs from films ===
Original songs from various films entered the top 10 throughout the year. These included "We Own It (Fast & Furious) (from Fast & Furious 6), "Bang Bang" (The Great Gatsby), "Ding-Dong! The Witch Is Dead" (The Wizard of Oz), "Carry You" & "Earthquake" (both from Kick Ass 2), "Best Song Ever" (One Direction: This Is Us), "We Own the Night" (The Wolverine) and "Happy" (Despicable Me 2).

=== Charity singles ===
A number of singles recorded for charity reached the top 10 in the charts in 2013.

=== Best-selling singles ===
Robin Thicke featuring T.I. and Pharrell Williams had the best-selling single of the year with "Blurred Lines". The song spent fourteen weeks in the top 10 (including five weeks at number one), sold over 1.472 million copies and was certified 3× platinum by the BPI (December 2015). "Get Lucky" by Daft Punk featuring Pharrell Williams & Nile Rodgers came in second place, selling more than 1.308 million copies and losing out by around 164,000 sales. Avicii featuring Aloe Blacc's "Wake Me Up", "Let Her Go" from Passenger, and "La La La" by Naughty Boy featuring Sam Smith made up the top five. Singles by Katy Perry, Macklemore & Ryan Lewis featuring Wanz, Pink featuring Nate Ruess, OneRepublic and Justin Timberlake were also in the top ten best-selling singles of the year.

== Top-ten singles ==
Key

Symbol	Meaning
‡	Single peaked in 2012 but still in chart in 2013.
♦	Single released in 2013 but peaked in 2014.
(#)	Year-end top ten single position and rank
Entered	The date that the single first appeared in the chart.
Peak	Highest position that the single reached in the UK Singles Chart.

Entered (week ending)	Weeks in top 10	Single	Artist	Peak	Peak reached (week ending)	Weeks at peak
Singles in 2012
29 September 2012	17	"Gangnam Style" ‡	Psy	1	6 October 2012	1
13 October 2012	14	"Diamonds" ‡	Rihanna	1	13 October 2012	1
20 October 2012	6	"Don't You Worry Child" ‡ ^{[A]}	Swedish House Mafia featuring John Martin	1	20 October 2012	1
3 November 2012	10	"Beneath Your Beautiful" ‡	Labrinth featuring Emeli Sandé	1	3 November 2012	1
10 November 2012	6	"Candy" ‡	Robbie Williams	1	10 November 2012	2
24 November 2012	10	"Locked Out of Heaven" ‡	Bruno Mars	2	24 November 2012	3
1 December 2012	8	"Troublemaker" ‡	Olly Murs featuring Flo Rida	1	1 December 2012	2
22 December 2012	9	"Impossible" ‡	James Arthur	1	22 December 2012	3
22 December 2012	9	"Scream & Shout"	will.i.am & Britney Spears	1	19 January 2013	2
22 December 2012	10	"Stay" ‡ ^{[A]}	Rihanna featuring Mikky Ekko	4	29 December 2012	4
29 December 2012	2	"He Ain't Heavy, He's My Brother" ‡ ^{[T]}	The Justice Collective	1	29 December 2012	1
29 December 2012	11	"I Knew You Were Trouble" ^{[B]}	Taylor Swift	2	19 January 2013	1
Singles in 2013
19 January 2013	7	"Drinking from the Bottle"	Calvin Harris featuring Tinie Tempah	5	19 January 2013	2
19 January 2013	1	"Where Are We Now?"	David Bowie	6	19 January 2013	1
19 January 2013	3	"Don't Stop the Party"	Pitbull featuring TJR	7	19 January 2013	1
26 January 2013	3	"My Life"	50 Cent featuring Eminem & Adam Levine	2	26 January 2013	1
26 January 2013	1	"Suit & Tie"	Justin Timberlake featuring Jay-Z	3	26 January 2013	1
26 January 2013	1	"Kiss You"	One Direction	9	26 January 2013	1
2 February 2013	4	"Get Up (Rattle)"	Bingo Players featuring Far East Movement	1	2 February 2013	2
2 February 2013	2	"Animal"	Conor Maynard featuring Wiley	6	2 February 2013	1
2 February 2013	5	"Clown"	Emeli Sandé	4	16 February 2013	1
9 February 2013	9	"Thrift Shop" (#7)	Macklemore & Ryan Lewis featuring Wanz	1	16 February 2013	1
9 February 2013	1	"Rewind"	Devlin featuring Diane Birch	10	9 February 2013	1
16 February 2013	4	"White Noise" ^{[C]}	Disclosure featuring AlunaGeorge	2	16 February 2013	1
16 February 2013	1	"My Songs Know What You Did in the Dark (Light Em Up)"	Fall Out Boy	5	16 February 2013	1
16 February 2013	1	"Bassline Junkie"	Dizzee Rascal	10	16 February 2013	1
23 February 2013	6	"I Could Be the One"	Avicii & Nicky Romero	1	23 February 2013	1
23 February 2013	4	"Harlem Shake"	Baauer	3	23 February 2013	2
23 February 2013	1	"Please Don't Say You Love Me"	Gabrielle Aplin	6	23 February 2013	1
23 February 2013	9	"When I Was Your Man"	Bruno Mars	2	16 March 2013	1
2 March 2013	5	"One Way or Another (Teenage Kicks)" ^{[M]}	One Direction	1	2 March 2013	1
2 March 2013	8	"Mirrors" (#10)	Justin Timberlake	1	9 March 2013	3
2 March 2013	1	"Only Love"	Ben Howard	9	2 March 2013	1
9 March 2013	8	"Pompeii"	Bastille	2	9 March 2013	1
9 March 2013	1	"Reload"	Wiley featuring Chip	9	9 March 2013	1
9 March 2013	11	"Just Give Me a Reason" (#8)	Pink featuring Nate Ruess	2	6 April 2013	2
16 March 2013	4	"Ready or Not"	Bridgit Mendler	7	16 March 2013	1
23 March 2013	1	"Boomerang"	Nicole Scherzinger	6	23 March 2013	1
30 March 2013	4	"What About Us"	The Saturdays featuring Sean Paul	1	30 March 2013	1
6 April 2013	2	"Let's Get Ready to Rhumble" ^{[D]}	PJ & Duncan	1	6 April 2013	1
6 April 2013	1	"On My Way"	Charlie Brown	7	6 April 2013	1
6 April 2013	5	"Hey Porsche"	Nelly	6	20 April 2013	1
13 April 2013	5	"Need U (100%)"	Duke Dumont featuring A*M*E	1	13 April 2013	2
13 April 2013	4	"Feel This Moment"	Pitbull featuring Christina Aguilera	5	20 April 2013	1
13 April 2013	1	"It's a Beautiful Day"	Michael Bublé	10	13 April 2013	1
20 April 2013	1	"Ding-Dong! The Witch Is Dead" ^{[L]}	The Wizard of Oz film cast	2	20 April 2013	1
20 April 2013	1	"22"	Taylor Swift	9	20 April 2013	1
27 April 2013	8	"Waiting All Night"	Rudimental featuring Ella Eyre	1	27 April 2013	1
27 April 2013	4	"#thatPOWER"	will.i.am featuring Justin Bieber	2	27 April 2013	1
27 April 2013	14	"Get Lucky" (#2) ^{[F]}	Daft Punk featuring Pharrell Williams	1	4 May 2013	4
27 April 2013	4	"I Need Your Love"	Calvin Harris featuring Ellie Goulding	4	4 May 2013	1
27 April 2013	1	"Gentleman"	Psy	10	27 April 2013	1
4 May 2013	7	"Can't Hold Us"	Macklemore & Ryan Lewis featuring Ray Dalton	3	11 May 2013	1
4 May 2013	1	"What a Night"	Loveable Rogues	9	4 May 2013	1
11 May 2013	14	"Let Her Go" (#4)	Passenger	2	25 May 2013	1
11 May 2013	4	"Play Hard"	David Guetta featuring Ne-Yo & Akon	6	11 May 2013	1
11 May 2013	1	"You & Me"	Disclosure featuring Eliza Doolittle	10	11 May 2013	1
18 May 2013	3	"So Good to Me"	Chris Malinchak	2	18 May 2013	1
18 May 2013	3	"This Is What It Feels Like"	Armin van Buuren featuring Trevor Guthrie	6	18 May 2013	1
25 May 2013	2	"Heart Attack" ^{[E]}	Demi Lovato	3	25 May 2013	1
25 May 2013	1	"Blackout"	Wretch 32 featuring Shakka	6	25 May 2013	1
25 May 2013	1	"Endorphins"	Sub Focus featuring Alex Clare	10	25 May 2013	1
1 June 2013	11	"La La La" (#5)	Naughty Boy featuring Sam Smith	1	1 June 2013	1
1 June 2013	2	"We Own It (Fast & Furious)"	2 Chainz & Wiz Khalifa	6	1 June 2013	1
1 June 2013	6	"Dear Darlin'"	Olly Murs	5	15 June 2013	2
8 June 2013	14	"Blurred Lines" (#1)	Robin Thicke featuring T.I. & Pharrell Williams	1	8 June 2013	5
8 June 2013	4	"Wild"	Jessie J featuring Big Sean & Dizzee Rascal	5	8 June 2013	1
15 June 2013	1	"Carry You"	Union J	6	15 June 2013	1
15 June 2013	2	"Antenna"	Fuse ODG	7	15 June 2013	1
22 June 2013	2	"Everything Has Changed"	Taylor Swift featuring Ed Sheeran	7	22 June 2013	1
22 June 2013	1	"I Will Survive"	Leah McFall	8	22 June 2013	1
22 June 2013	1	"Lights On"	Wiley featuring Angel & Tinchy Stryder	9	22 June 2013	1
29 June 2013	4	"The Other Side"	Jason Derulo	2	29 June 2013	1
29 June 2013	2	"Goin' Crazy"	Dizzee Rascal featuring Robbie Williams	5	29 June 2013	1
29 June 2013	1	"Another Love"	Tom Odell	10	29 June 2013	1
6 July 2013	7	"I Love It"	Icona Pop featuring Charli XCX	1	6 July 2013	1
6 July 2013	6	"Bang Bang"	will.i.am	3	6 July 2013	1
6 July 2013	1	"Walks like Rihanna"	The Wanted	4	6 July 2013	1
13 July 2013	6	"Love Me Again"	John Newman	1	13 July 2013	1
13 July 2013	2	"Lighters (The One)"	Gabz	6	13 July 2013	1
13 July 2013	1	"Lost & Not Found"	Chase & Status featuring Louis M^ttrs	9	13 July 2013	1
20 July 2013	2	"Reload"	Sebastian Ingrosso & Tommy Trash featuring John Martin	3	20 July 2013	1
20 July 2013	1	"Brokenhearted"	Lawson featuring B.o.B	6	20 July 2013	1
27 July 2013	11	"Wake Me Up" (#3)	Avicii	1	27 July 2013	3
27 July 2013	2	"Come & Get It"	Selena Gomez	8	27 July 2013	1
27 July 2013	1	"Jack"	Breach	9	27 July 2013	1
3 August 2013	3	"Best Song Ever"	One Direction	2	3 August 2013	1
10 August 2013	7	"Summertime Sadness"	Lana Del Rey vs. Cedric Gervais	4	10 August 2013	4
10 August 2013	2	"Thinking About You"	Calvin Harris featuring Ayah Marar	8	17 August 2013	1
17 August 2013	6	"We Can't Stop"	Miley Cyrus	1	17 August 2013	1
17 August 2013	2	"Trampoline"	Tinie Tempah featuring 2 Chainz	3	17 August 2013	1
17 August 2013	2	"Holy Grail"	Jay-Z featuring Justin Timberlake	7	17 August 2013	1
24 August 2013	7	"Burn"	Ellie Goulding	1	24 August 2013	3
24 August 2013	5	"Applause"	Lady Gaga	5	24 August 2013	1
24 August 2013	1	"Why'd You Only Call Me When You're High?"	Arctic Monkeys	8	24 August 2013	1
24 August 2013	1	"We Own the Night"	The Wanted	10	24 August 2013	1
31 August 2013	5	"Sonnentanz (Sun Don't Shine)"	Klangkarussell featuring Will Heard	3	31 August 2013	2
31 August 2013	3	"Earthquake"	DJ Fresh & Diplo featuring Dominique Young Unique	4	31 August 2013	1
31 August 2013	1	"Other Side of Love"	Sean Paul	7	31 August 2013	1
31 August 2013	1	"Lifted"	Naughty Boy featuring Emeli Sandé	8	31 August 2013	1
7 September 2013	2	"Lost Generation"	Rizzle Kicks	6	7 September 2013	1
7 September 2013	7	"Hold On, We're Going Home" ^{[H]}	Drake featuring Majid Jordan	4	5 October 2013	1
14 September 2013	10	"Roar" (#6) ^{[J]}	Katy Perry	1	14 September 2013	2
21 September 2013	11	"Counting Stars" (#9) ^{[J]}	OneRepublic	1	12 October 2013	2
21 September 2013	4	"Same Love"	Macklemore & Ryan Lewis featuring Mary Lambert	6	5 October 2013	1
28 September 2013	4	"Talk Dirty"	Jason Derulo featuring 2 Chainz	1	28 September 2013	2
28 September 2013	2	"It's My Party"	Jessie J	3	28 September 2013	1
28 September 2013	3	"You Make Me"	Avicii	5	28 September 2013	2
5 October 2013	1	"What I Might Do"	Ben Pearce	7	5 October 2013	1
12 October 2013	2	"Can We Dance"	The Vamps	2	12 October 2013	1
12 October 2013	1	"Count on Me"	Chase & Status featuring Moko	5	12 October 2013	1
12 October 2013	1	"Skyscraper" ^{[G]}	Demi Lovato	7	12 October 2013	1
12 October 2013	1	"Something Really Bad"	Dizzee Rascal featuring will.i.am	10	12 October 2013	1
19 October 2013	4	"Wrecking Ball"	Miley Cyrus	1	19 October 2013	1
19 October 2013	2	"Berzerk"	Eminem	2	19 October 2013	1
19 October 2013	2	"R U Crazy"	Conor Maynard	4	19 October 2013	1
19 October 2013	1	"Disco Love"	The Saturdays	5	19 October 2013	1
19 October 2013	3	"Bonfire Heart"	James Blunt	4	26 October 2013	1
19 October 2013	1	"Cheating"	John Newman	9	19 October 2013	1
26 October 2013	1	"Juliet"	Lawson	3	26 October 2013	1
26 October 2013	1	"Rap God"	Eminem	5	26 October 2013	1
26 October 2013	2	"Afterglow"	Wilkinson	8	26 October 2013	1
26 October 2013	1	"Change Your Life"	Iggy Azalea featuring T.I.	10	26 October 2013	1
2 November 2013	4	"Royals"	Lorde	1	2 November 2013	1
2 November 2013	3	"You're Nobody 'til Somebody Loves You"	James Arthur	2	2 November 2013	1
2 November 2013	1	"Booyah"	Showtek featuring We Are Loud! & Sonny Wilson	5	2 November 2013	1
2 November 2013	1	"Beautiful Life"	Union J	8	2 November 2013	1
9 November 2013	12	"The Monster"	Eminem featuring Rihanna	1	9 November 2013	1
9 November 2013	2	"Eat, Sleep, Rave, Repeat"	Fatboy Slim & Riva Starr featuring Beardyman	3	9 November 2013	1
9 November 2013	10	"Story of My Life"	One Direction	2	14 December 2013	1
9 November 2013	2	"Children of the Sun"	Tinie Tempah featuring John Martin	6	9 November 2013	1
9 November 2013	1	"Show Me Love (America)"	The Wanted	8	9 November 2013	1
16 November 2013	3	"Look Right Through (MK Remix)"	Storm Queen	1	16 November 2013	1
16 November 2013	3	"Move"	Little Mix	3	16 November 2013	1
16 November 2013	1	"Work Bitch"	Britney Spears	7	16 November 2013	1
23 November 2013	6	"Animals" ^{[K]}	Martin Garrix	1	23 November 2013	1
23 November 2013	7	"Somewhere Only We Know"	Lily Allen	1	30 November 2013	3
23 November 2013	10	"How Long Will I Love You?" ^{[N]}	Ellie Goulding	3	23 November 2013	1
23 November 2013	2	"Do What U Want" ^{[I]}	Lady Gaga featuring R. Kelly	9	23 November 2013	1
23 November 2013	1	"Go Gentle"	Robbie Williams	10	23 November 2013	1
30 November 2013	4	"Of the Night"	Bastille	2	30 November 2013	1
30 November 2013	4	"Let Me Go"	Gary Barlow	2	7 December 2013	1
30 November 2013	1	"Hard out Here"	Lily Allen	9	30 November 2013	1
7 December 2013	2	"Under Control"	Calvin Harris & Alesso featuring Hurts	1	7 December 2013	1
7 December 2013	1	"Love Is on the Radio"	McFly	6	7 December 2013	1
7 December 2013	1	"Everything You Never Had (We Had It All)"	Breach featuring Andreya Triana	9	7 December 2013	1
14 December 2013	10	"Hey Brother"	Avicii	2	21 December 2013	1
21 December 2013	2	"One More Sleep"	Leona Lewis	3	21 December 2013	2
21 December 2013	20	"Happy"♦	Pharrell Williams	1	4 January 2014	4
21 December 2013	8	"Trumpets"♦	Jason Derulo	4	4 January 2014	4
28 December 2013	3	"Skyscraper"	Sam Bailey	1	28 December 2013	1
28 December 2013	1	"Highway to Hell"	AC/DC	4	28 December 2013	1

== Entries by artist ==
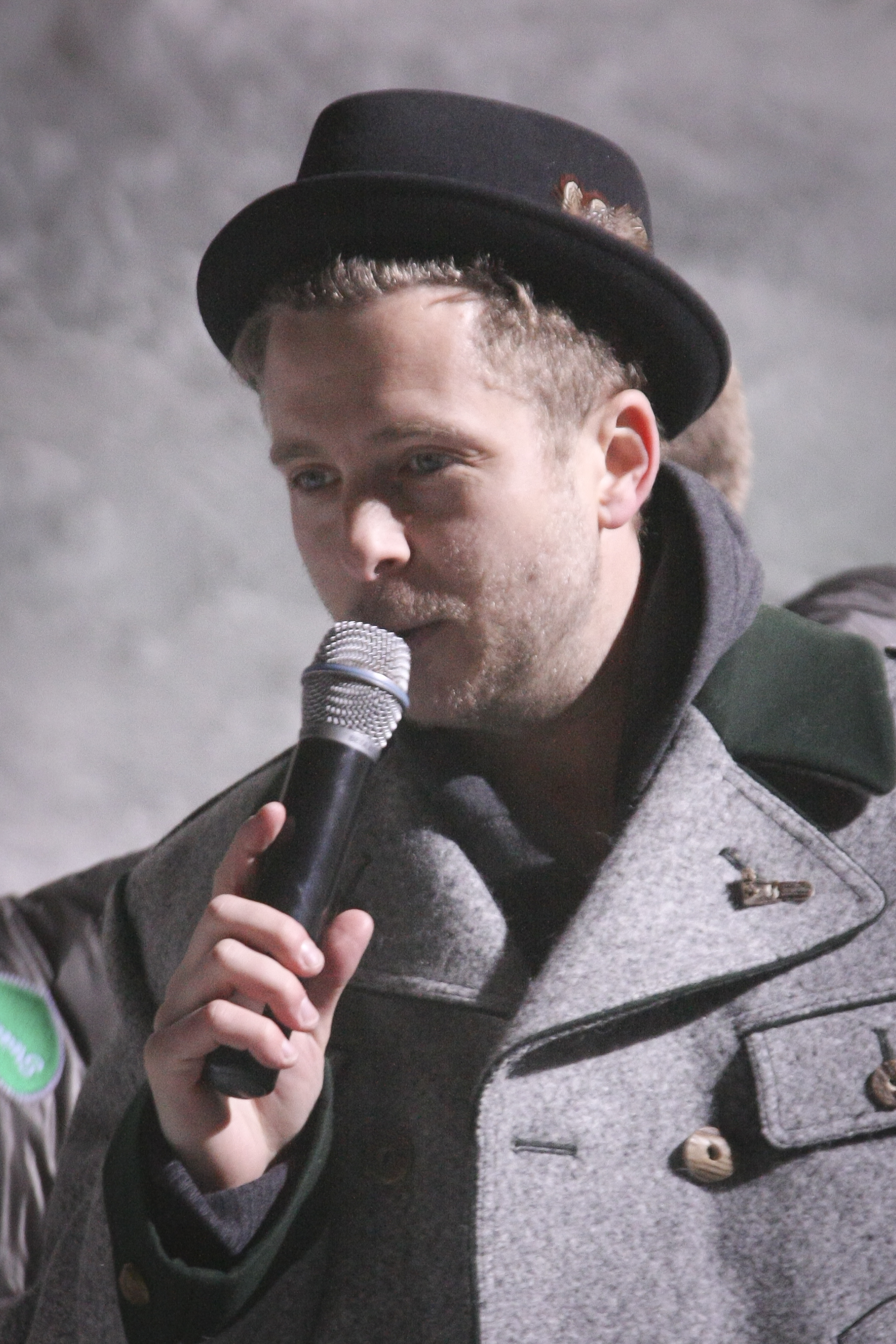
Ryan Tedder and his group OneRepublic had one of the biggest selling singles of the year with "Counting Stars", which spent a total of 11 weeks in the UK top 10, two of which were at number-one.

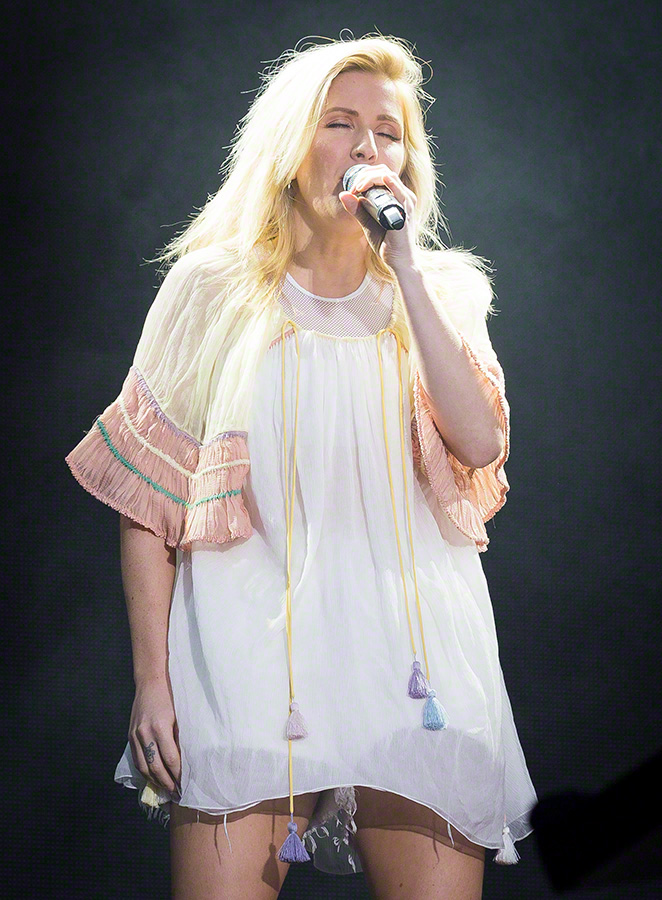
Ellie Goulding scored her first UK number-one single in August 2013 with "Burn", which topped the chart for three consecutive weeks. It was one of three top 10 entries for Goulding this year.

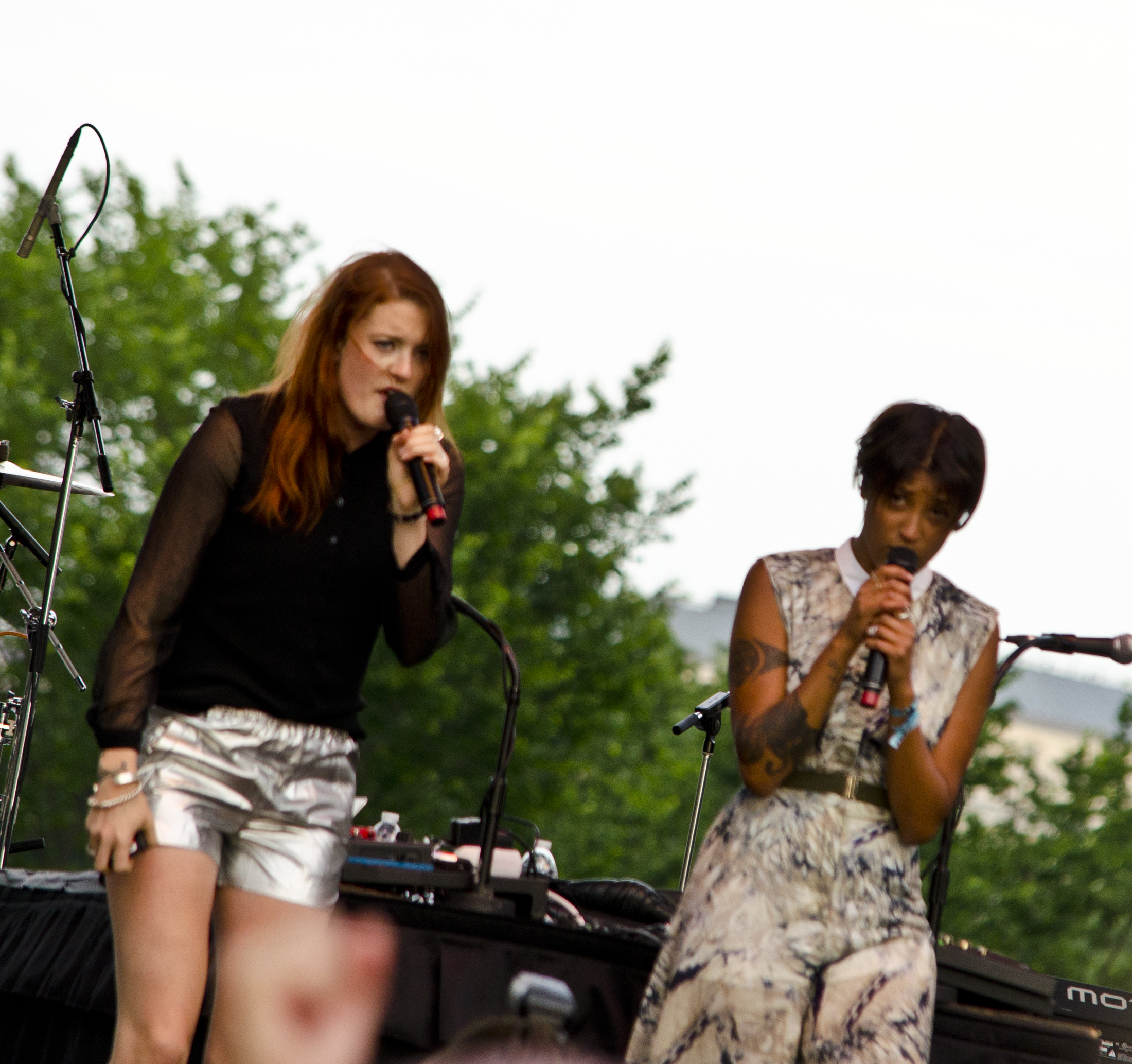
Swedish duo Icona Pop entered the UK charts at number-one in July of this year with "I Love It", which features guest vocals from English singer Charli XCX.

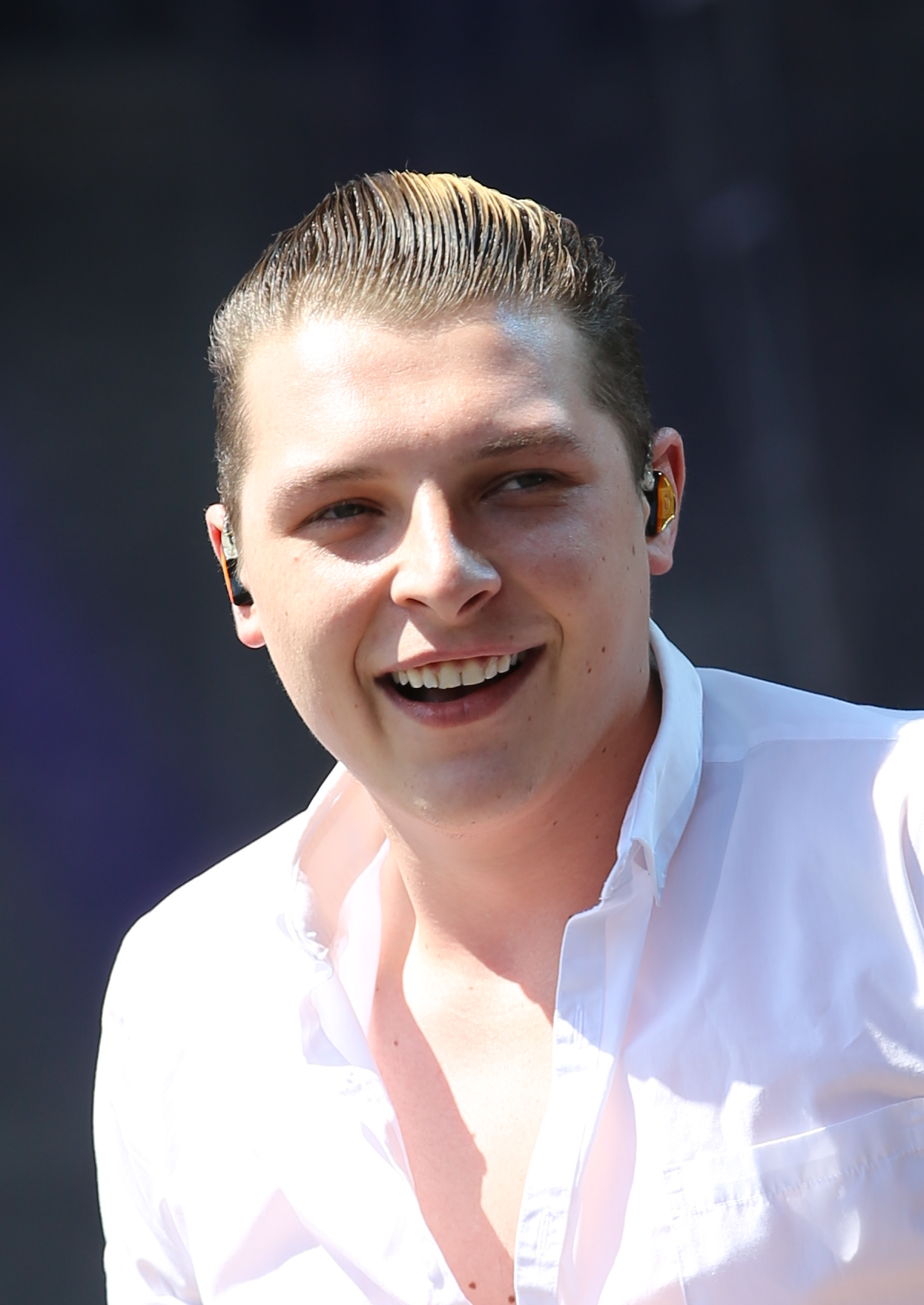
John Newman achieved two top 10 singles in 2013, including "Love Me Again", which reached number-one for one week in July.

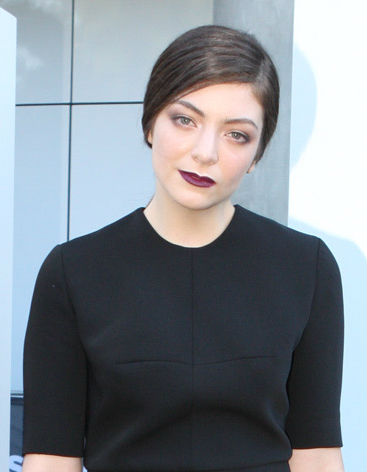
New Zealand singer Lorde was just sixteen years old when she reached number-one in the UK Singles Chart in 2013 with her debut single "Royals".

The following table shows artists who achieved two or more top 10 entries in 2013, including singles that reached their peak in 2012 or 2014. The figures include both main artists and featured artists, while appearances on ensemble charity records are also counted for each artist. The total number of weeks an artist spent in the top ten in 2013 is also shown.

Entries	Artist	Weeks	Singles
5	Calvin Harris	17	"Drinking from the Bottle", "Eat, Sleep, Rave, Repeat", "I Need Your Love", "Thinking About You", "Under Control"
4	Avicii	23	"Hey Brother", "I Could Be the One", "Wake Me Up", "You Make Me"
4	Dizzee Rascal ^{[O]}	8	"Bassline Junkie", "Goin' Crazy", "Something Really Bad", "Wild"
4	Eminem ^{[P]}	14	"Berzerk", "The Monster", "My Life", "Rap God"
4	One Direction	17	"Best Song Ever", "Kiss You", "One Way or Another (Teenage Kicks)", "Story of My Life"
4	Robbie Williams ^{[Q]}^{[R]}^{[U]}	5	"Candy", "Go Gentle", "Goin' Crazy", "He Ain't Heavy, He's My Brother"
4	will.i.am ^{[R]}^{[V]}^{[MM]}	18	"Bang Bang", "Scream & Shout", "Something Really Bad", "#thatPOWER"
3	2 Chainz ^{[W]}	8	"Talk Dirty", "Trampoline", "We Own It (Fast & Furious)"
3	Andy Brown ^{[X]}^{[U]}	3	"Brokenhearted", "He Ain't Heavy, He's My Brother", "Juliet"
3	Ellie Goulding ^{[Y]}	17	"Burn", "How Long Will I Love You?", "I Need Your Love"
3	Emeli Sandé ^{[R]}^{[Z]}	7	"Beneath Your Beautiful", "Clown", "Lifted"
3	Jason Derulo ^{[S]}	10	"The Other Side", "Talk Dirty", "Trumpets"
3	John Martin ^{[R]}^{[AA]}	5	"Children of the Sun", "Don't You Worry Child", "Reload"
3	Justin Timberlake ^{[BB]}	11	"Holy Grail", "Mirrors", "Suit & Tie"
3	Macklemore & Ryan Lewis	20	"Can't Hold Us", "Same Love", "Thrift Shop"
3	Pharrell Williams ^{[S]}^{[CC]}^{[KK]}	30	"Blurred Lines", "Get Lucky", "Happy"
3	Rihanna ^{[R]}^{[DD]}	11	"Diamonds", "The Monster", "Stay"
3	Taylor Swift ^{[MM]}	13	"22", "Everything Has Changed", "I Knew You Were Trouble"
3	Tinie Tempah ^{[EE]}	11	"Children of the Sun", "Drinking from the Bottle", "Trampoline"
3	The Wanted	3	"Show Me Love (America)", "Walks Like Rihanna", "We Own the Night"
3	Wiley ^{[FF]}	4	"Animal", "Lights On", "Reload"
2	Bastille	12	"Of the Night", "Pompeii"
2	Breach		"Everything You Never Had (We Had It All)", "Jack"
2	Britney Spears ^{[MM]}	8	"Scream & Shout", "Work Bitch"
2	Bruno Mars ^{[R]}	13	"Locked Out of Heaven", "When I Was Your Man"
2	Chase & Status	2	"Count on Me", "Lost & Not Found"
2	Conor Maynard	4	"Animal", "R U Crazy"
2	Demi Lovato	3	"Heart Attack", "Skyscraper"
2	Disclosure	5	"White Noise", "You & Me"
2	Eliza Doolittle ^{[U]}^{[GG]}	2	"He Ain't Heavy, He's My Brother", "You & Me"
2	James Arthur ^{[R]}	10	"Impossible", "You're Nobody 'til Somebody Loves You"
2	Jay-Z ^{[HH]}	3	"Holy Grail", "Suit & Tie"
2	Jessie J	6	"It's My Party", "Wild"
2	John Newman	7	"Cheating", "Love Me Again"
2	Lady Gaga	7	"Applause", "Do What U Want"
2	Lawson	2	"Brokenhearted", "Juliet"
2	Lily Allen	7	"Hard out Here", "Somewhere Only We Know"
2	Miley Cyrus	10	"We Can't Stop", "Wrecking Ball"
2	Naughty Boy	12	"La La La", "Lifted"
2	Olly Murs ^{[R]}	9	"Dear Darlin'", "Troublemaker"
2	Pitbull	7	"Don't Stop the Party", "Feel This Moment"
2	Psy ^{[R]}	4	"Gangnam Style", "Gentleman"
2	The Saturdays	5	"Disco Love", "What About Us"
2	Sean Paul ^{[II]}	5	"Other Side of Love", "What About Us"
2	Sebastian Ingrosso ^{[R]}	3	"Don't You Worry Child", "Reload"
2	T.I. ^{[CC]}^{[LL]}	15	"Blurred Lines", "Change Your Life"
2	Union J	2	"Beautiful Life", "Carry You"

== Notes ==
- ^{a} "Stay" and "Don't You Worry Child" re-entered the top 10 at number seven and number nine respectively on 12 January 2013 (week ending).
- ^{b} "I Knew You Were Trouble" re-entered the top 10 at number six on 2 March 2013 (week ending).
- ^{c} "White Noise" re-entered the top 10 at number 10 on 23 March 2013 (week ending).
- ^{d} "Let's Get Ready to Rhumble" re-entered the top 10 at number one on 6 April 2013 (week ending) following a performance by Ant and Dec on Ant and Dec's Saturday Night Takeaway; the single originally peaked at number 9 in 1994.
- ^{e} "Heart Attack" re-entered the top 10 at number ten on 8 June 2013 (week ending).
- ^{f} "Get Lucky" re-entered the top 10 at number nine on 3 August 2013 (week ending).
- ^{g} "Skyscraper" was originally released in 2012, but entered the top 10 at number seven on 12 October 2013 (week ending).
- ^{h} "Hold On, We're Going Home" re-entered the top 10 at number ten on 2 November 2013 (week ending).
- ^{i} "Do What U Want" re-entered the top 10 at number ten on 14 December 2013 (week ending).
- ^{j} "Roar" and "Counting Stars" re-entered the top 10 at number eight and number ten respectively on 4 January 2014 (week ending).
- ^{k} "Animals" re-entered the top 10 at number eight on 11 January 2014 (week ending).
- ^{l} "Ding-Dong! The Witch Is Dead" entered the chart following the death of Margaret Thatcher as a protest against her politics when she was Prime Minister.
- ^{m} Released as the official single for Comic Relief.
- ^{n} Released as the official single for Children in Need.
- ^{o} Figure includes appearance on Jessie J's "Wild".
- ^{p} Figure includes appearance on 50 Cent's "My Life".
- ^{q} Figure includes appearance on Dizzee Rascal's "Goin' Crazy".
- ^{r} Figure includes single that peaked in 2012.
- ^{s} Figure includes single that peaked in 2014.
- ^{t} Released to support the families affected by the Hillsborough disaster.
- ^{u} Figure includes an appearance on the Justice Collective charity single "He Ain't Heavy, He's My Brother".
- ^{v} Figure includes appearance on Dizzee Rascal's "Something Really Bad".
- ^{w} Figure includes appearances on Jason Derulo's "Talk Dirty" and Tinie Tempah's "Trampoline".
- ^{x} Figure includes two top 10 singles with the group Lawson.
- ^{y} Figure includes appearance on Calvin Harris' "I Need Your Love".
- ^{z} Figure includes appearances on Labrinth's "Beneath Your Beautiful" and Naughty Boy's "Lifted".
- ^{aa} Figure includes appearances on Tinie Tempah's "Children of the Sun", Swedish House Maffia's "Don't You Worry Child", and Sebastian Ingrosso and Tommy Trash's "Reload".
- ^{bb} Figure includes appearance on Jay-Z's "Holy Grail".
- ^{cc} Figure includes appearance on Robin Thicke's "Blurred Lines".
- ^{dd} Figure includes appearance on Eminem's "The Monster".
- ^{ee} Figure includes appearance on Tinie Tempah's "Drinking from the Bottle".
- ^{ff} Figure includes appearance on Conor Maynard's "Animal".
- ^{gg} Figure includes appearance on Disclosure's "You & Me".
- ^{hh} Figure includes appearance on Justin Timberlake's "Suit & Tie".
- ^{ii} Figure includes appearance on The Saturdays' "What About Us".
- ^{jj} Figure includes one top 10 single with the group Swedish House Maffia.
- ^{kk} Figure includes appearance on Daft Punk's "Get Lucky".
- ^{ll} Figure includes appearance on Iggy Azalea's "Change Your Life".
- ^{mm} Figure includes single that first charted in 2012 but peaked in 2013.

== See also ==
- 2013 in British music
- List of number-one singles from the 2010s (UK)
