= Lighter (disambiguation) =

A lighter is a hand-held device for creating a flame.

Lighter can also be:

- Lighter (barge), a type of flat-bottomed barge used to transfer goods to and from moored ships
- Lightering, also called "lighterage", the process of transferring cargo between vessels of different sizes

== Songs ==
- "Lighter" (Galantis, David Guetta and 5 Seconds of Summer song), 2024
- "Lighter" (Kyle Alessandro song), 2025
- "Lighter" (Jelly Roll and Carín León song), 2026
- "Lighter" (Nathan Dawe song), 2020
- "Lighters" (song), a 2011 song by Bad Meets Evil featuring Bruno Mars
- "Lighters (The One)", a 2013 song by Gabz
- "Lighter", a 2015 song by Miley Cyrus song from her album Miley Cyrus & Her Dead Petz
- "Lighter", a song by Miss Kittin from Radio Caroline Vol.1

== See also ==
- Light
- Liter
- Weight
