= Nobel School =

Location
- Mobbsbury Way; Stevenage, Hertfordshire, SG2 0HS; England; 51.911339°N 0.168270°W

Information
- Type: Foundation school
- Established: 1961
- Local authority: Hertfordshire
- Department for Education URN: 117530 Tables
- Ofsted: Reports
- Chair of Governors: Kelly Hagland
- Head Teacher: Ravinder Phagura
- Gender: Co-educational
- Age: 11 to 18
- Enrolment: 1500
- Houses: Curie, Eliot, Mandela, Teresa
- Colours: Blue, Green, Red, Yellow
- Website: https://thenobelschool.org/

The Nobel School is a co-educational secondary school and sixth form located in Stevenage in the English county of Hertfordshire.

== History ==
The Nobel School was founded in 1961 as a Technical Grammar School and shared a site with The Girls Grammar School on Six Hills Way, Stevenage. In 1962, the Technical Grammar School moved from Six Hills Way to Telford Avenue and with permission from The Nobel Institute, the School subsequently adopted ‘Nobel’ to become The Nobel Grammar School. In 1970, the School changed its name for the third and final time to The Nobel School. Subsequently, in 1983, the School moved to the former Chells School site and the Telford Avenue buildings were demolished.

In Summer 2010, a new build programme commenced to replace the then School buildings as part of the Building Schools for the Future programme. Building work continued through 2011 and 2012 and the School was officially reopened in September 2013. The Nobel School received a 'good school' rating from Ofsted in 2023.

== Notable former pupils ==
- Peter Bissell, English road and track racing cyclist.
- Ash Gray, Britain's Got Talent contestant known as Gabz, singer-songwriter – peaked at number 6 in UK charts.
- Keinan Davis, English footballer.
