= Peter Bissell =

Personal information
- Full name: Peter Robert Bissell
- Born: 11 March 1986 Stevenage, Hertfordshire, England
- Died: 29 December 2007 (aged 21)

Cycling career
- Sport: Cycling
- Disciplines: Road and track
- Role: Rider
- Rider type: Time trial, break away

Amateur team
- 1997–2004: Welwyn Wheelers/Team Welwyn

Professional teams
- 2005–2007: Arctic Shorter Rochford Racing Team
- 2005–2006: Team Cycliste Albert Bigot 79
- 2007: VS Quimper 2007

Major wins
- (United Kingdom) British National Road Race Champion

Peter Robert Bissell (11 March 1986 – 29 December 2007) was an English road and track racing cyclist, who died aged 21. In 2006 he was the British under-23 road race champion.

Bissell began cycling aged 11 in 1997, joining the Welwyn Wheelers the following year. He attended The Nobel School in Stevenage from 1997 to 2001. Bissell began to take the sport more seriously in 2000, coming second in the under-14 omnium at the national track championships.

After success as a juvenile and junior, he was awarded the Chris Boardman Trophy in 2005. He then raced in France with Albert Bigot 79,(2005 and 2006) and VS Quimper (2007). Bissell was supported by the Dave Rayner Fund in 2006 and 2007. He was due to return to France in 2008 to become a professional with the Hennebont team but died after his heart stopped on a night out with friends.

His sister, Laura Bissell is also a successful cyclist.

== Palmarès ==
2000
2nd British National Track Championships, Under 14 Omnium
2002
3rd Pursuit, British National Track Championships, Under 16
3rd 500m TT, British National Track Championships, Under 16
2004
Joint 1st British National 10 Time Trial Championships, Junior
1st British National Hill Climb Championships
2nd British National 25 Time Trial Championships, Junior
2005
1st la Voide
1st Bazoges en Pailliers
2006
1st (United Kingdom) British National Road Race Championships, Under 23 (Espoirs)
2007
1st routes du Scorff
1st Quimper
2nd Blois
