= The Fifth (Dizzee Rascal album) =

Studio album by Dizzee Rascal
- Released: 30 September 2013
- Recorded: September 2011 – April 2013
- Genre: Hip hop; alternative dance; hip house; grime
- Length: 47:21
- Label: Dirtee Stank, Island
- Producer: A-Trak, Tim Anderson, DJ Corbett, Nick Marsh, Free School, Hi-Tek, J-Man, Jimmy Joker, Jonas Jeberg, Oligee, RedOne, Eric Sanicola, Teddy Sky, will.i.am

Dizzee Rascal chronology
Tongue n' Cheek (2009)	The Fifth (2013)	Raskit (2017)

Singles from The Fifth
- 1. "Goin' Crazy" Released: 16 June 2013; 2. "Something Really Bad" Released: 29 September 2013; 3. "Love This Town" Released: 28 November 2013

The Fifth is the fifth studio album by English rapper Dizzee Rascal. It was released on 30 September 2013 under Dirtee Stank Recordings and Island Records. The Fifth is Dizzee Rascal's first release since he signed with Universal. It succeeds his fourth studio album Tongue n' Cheek (2009) and features production from RedOne, Nick Marsh, M.J. Cole, Baptiste, Goldstein, Andrew "Pop" Wansel, and Teddy Sky, among others. The album features guest appearances from singers Jessie J, Robbie Williams, Sean Kingston, Angel, and rappers Tinie Tempah, Bun B, Trae tha Truth, and Will.i.am. The album's track listing was confirmed when it was made available to pre-order via the iTunes Store.

== Background ==
Dizzee commented on the album: "It's the best-produced album I've done so far. If my last record was dipping my foot into the swimming pool of happiness, this one is fully going for a swim – backstroke, butterfly, in every way... not just doggy paddle". The majority of the album was produced in Los Angeles between 2011-2013 and follows the same experimental genre of Rascal's previous studio album, Tongue n' Cheek (2009).

== Critical reception ==
Professional ratings
Aggregate scores
Source	Rating
Metacritic	51/100
Review scores
Source	Rating
AllMusic	3/5 stars
Clash	3/10
Fact	2/5 stars
The Guardian	4/5 stars
Mojo	2/5 stars
musicOMH	2/5 stars
NME	5/10
Q	2/5 stars
RapReviews	4.5/10
The Daily Telegraph	3/5 stars

The Fifth received mixed reviews from music critics. At Metacritic, which assigns a normalised rating out of 100 to reviews from mainstream critics, the album received an average score of 51 based on 11 reviews, which indicates "mixed or average reviews".

== Singles ==
- "Goin' Crazy", featuring Robbie Williams, was the official lead single from the album on 16 June 2013. The music video premiered on 14 May 2013, and features Dizzee and Robbie leading a gang, whilst driving hyped-up mobility scooters. The single was released physically in Germany accompanied by the instrumental version. The single peaked at #5 on the UK Singles Chart, becoming the most successful from the album yet.
- "Something Really Bad", featuring will.i.am and produced by Jonas Jeberg, will be released as the second official single from the album on 29 September 2013. The music video premiered on 2 September 2013, and features will.i.am on a video screen performing his verses, while Dizzee is in-studio dancing with a number of female dancers surrounding him.
- "Love This Town", featuring Teddy Sky, was released as the third single from the album on 28 November 2013.

=== Promotional singles ===
- "Bassline Junkie", which was also included on Rascal's mixtape DirteeTV.com – The Mixtape, Vol. 2, was released on 1 January 2013 as a promotional single from the album. It was released to support to mixtape after it impacted the top 100 on the UK Singles Chart. The song peaked at number 10 with the help of radio airplay, and thus was selected for inclusion as a bonus track on the album following its chart success.
- "H-Town", featuring Bun B and Trae tha Truth, was released as the second promotional single from the album on 1 May 2013. It achieved little airplay on radio, and failed to impact the UK Singles Chart, and was quickly succeeded by the release of the first official single from the album.
- "I Don't Need a Reason" was released as the third promotional single from the album on 11 July 2013. Initially planned as the second official single, a music video was filmed and released on YouTube on 18 August 2013, which depicts Dizzee as an Edwardian gent, and uses camera effects to distort eye movements, although again due to very little airplay and no promotion, the single failed to impact the UK Singles Chart and was demoted to a promotional single, and a second official single quickly succeeded it. The song was also featured in WatchDogs 2.
- "Bang Bang" was released as the fourth promotional single from the album to support the Deluxe Edition of the album. A music video was filmed and released on YouTube on 16 December 2013.

== Track listing ==
No.	Title	Writer(s)	Producer(s)	Length
1.	"Superman"	Dylan Mills, Nick Marsh, Michael McHenry	Free School	4:31
2.	"I Don't Need a Reason"	Mills, Nick Marsh, Baptiste, Buendia, McHenry	Free School	3:17
3.	"We Don't Play Around" (featuring Jessie J)	Mills, Jessica Cornish, Teddy Sky, Jimmy Joker, RedOne	RedOne, Jimmy Joker, Teddy Sky	3:08
4.	"Good" (featuring Angel)	Mills, Tony Cottrell, Bryant Walker	DJ Corbett, Hi-Tek	4:01
5.	"Spend Some Money" (featuring Tinie Tempah)	Mills, Patrick Okogwu, Baptiste, Buendia, McHenry	Free School	3:33
6.	"Arse Like That" (featuring Sean Kingston)	Mills, Teddy Sky, Björn Djupström, RedOne, Jimmy Joker	RedOne, Jimmy Joker, Teddy Sky	3:54
7.	"Something Really Bad" (featuring will.i.am)	Mills, Baptiste, William Adams, Jonas Jeberg	Jeberg	3:40
8.	"Goin' Crazy" (featuring Robbie Williams)	Mills, Robbie Williams, Tim Anderson, Jamin Wilcox	Anderson, J-Man, Nick Cage (add.)	3:24
9.	"Love This Town" (featuring Teddy Sky)	Mills, Teddy Sky, RedOne, Jimmy Joker, Eric Sanicola	RedOne, Teddy Sky, Jimmy Joker, Sanicola	4:00
10.	"H-Town" (featuring Bun B and Trae tha Truth)	Mills, Bernard Freeman, Frazier Thompson, Alain Macklovitch, Oliver Goldstein	A-Trak, Oligee	3:39
11.	"Heart of a Warrior" (featuring Teddy Sky)	Mills, Teddy Sky, RedOne, Jimmy Joker	RedOne, Jimmy Joker, Teddy Sky	3:14
12.	"Life Keeps Moving On" (featuring Pop Wansel)	Mills, Anderson, Wilcox	Anderson, J-Man	3:53
13.	"Bassline Junkie" (bonus track)	Mills, M.J. Cole	Cole	3:24
Total length:				47:40

Deluxe edition
No.	Title	Writer(s)	Producer(s)	Length
9.	"Bang Bang" (featuring Pop Wansel)	Mills, Andrew "Pop" Wansel	@Oakwud, @Flippa123, @PopWansel	3:07
10.	"Love This Town" (featuring Teddy Sky)	Mills, Sky, RedOne, Joker, Sanicola	RedOne, Sky, Sanicola, Joker	4:00
11.	"H-Town" (featuring Bun B and Trae tha Truth)	Mills, Bernard Freeman, Frazier Thompson, Macklovitch, Goldstein	A-Trak	3:39
12.	"Heart of a Warrior" (featuring Teddy Sky)	Mills, Sky, RedOne, Joker	RedOne, Sky	3:14
13.	"Life Keeps Moving On" (featuring Pop Wansel)	Mills, Tim Anderson, Jamin Wilcox	Tim Anderson	3:53
14.	"Here 2 China" (Dillon Francis and Calvin Harris featuring Dizzee Rascal)	Mills, Calvin Harris, Dillon Francis	Calvin Harris, Dillon Francis	2:33
15.	"Bassline Junkie"	Mills, Cole	M.J. Cole	3:24
16.	"Watch Your Back"	Mills, Tim Anderson	Tim Anderson	3:50
Total length:				57:08

== Charts ==
Chart performance for The Fifth
Chart (2013)	Peak position
Australian Albums (ARIA)	33
Belgian Albums (Ultratop Flanders)	162
Belgian Albums (Ultratop Wallonia)	195
New Zealand Albums (RMNZ)	40
Scottish Albums (Official Charts)	18
Swiss Albums (Schweizer Hitparade)	48
UK Albums (Official Charts)	10
