= If U Got It =

Single by Chris Malinchak
- Released: January 24, 2014
- Recorded: 2012
- Genre: House, deep house
- Length: 3:22 (radio edit); 5:25 (extended mix)
- Songwriter(s): Chris Malinchak
- Producer(s): Chris Malinchak

Chris Malinchak singles chronology
"So Good to Me" (2013)	"If U Got It" (2014)

"If U Got It" is a song by American DJ and record producer Chris Malinchak. The single first appeared on August 14, 2012, under the French Express label, and was released on January 24, 2014. The song samples lyrics from "I'm Gonna Make You Love Me" by The Supremes and "Cruisin'" by Smokey Robinson.

== Music video ==
A music video to accompany the release of "If U Got It" was first released onto YouTube on November 28, 2013, at a total length of three minutes and forty-seven seconds. This video features a guy who spots a gorgeous girl on a bus with "another guy" (in fact, a doppelgänger of himself). On the bus ride, she turns around and ogles him. The two, locking eyes as they repeatedly pass each other around the city of Barcelona. She stays with this "other guy", as he quietly pursues her. Later, he learns that she threw "him" out (their apartment upstairs from his). Afterwards, he meets another woman (a doppelgänger of the original woman), not knowing that this scenario would repeat itself all over again when they catch a bus."

== Track listing ==
Digital download
No.	Title	Length
1.	"If U Got It" (radio edit)	3:22

Digital download
No.	Title	Length
1.	"If U Got It" (extended mix)	5:25
2.	"If U Got It" (Mark Knight remix)	6:32
3.	"If U Got It" (Joe Hertz remix)	4:36

== Charts ==
Chart (2014)	Peak position
Belgium (Ultratip Bubbling Under Flanders)	21
Scotland (OCC)	33
UK Dance (OCC)	7
UK Singles (OCC)	23

== Release history ==
Region	Date	Format	Label
United Kingdom	January 24, 2014	Digital download	Sony Music
