= 2013 in British music charts =

The UK Singles Chart and UK Albums Chart are two of many music charts compiled by the Official Charts Company that calculates the best-selling singles/albums of the week in the United Kingdom. Since 2004 the chart has been based on the sales of both physical singles/albums and digital downloads, with airplay figures excluded from the official chart. A total of 30 singles (1 of which claimed the top spot in 2012) and 35 albums (3 of which claimed the top spot in 2012) claimed the top spot in 2013.

Every song which reached number one between 27 April and 13 July sold over 100,000 copies during its first week of sales although it failed to break a record which was previously held in 1997 where the number one single would sell 100,000 copies or more in its first week of sales every week from 28 June 1997 through to 3 January 1998.

Album sales, however, were at an all-time low with only 93,200,000 albums sold. It was also the first time since 1984 where an artist studio album released in the same period, failed to sell over a million copies by the end of the year.

Following the release of David Bowie's comeback single "Where Are We Now", singles became eligible to chart, before the release of its parent album.

In the singles chart, James Arthur returned to the top of the charts, having reached number one in 2012 with "Impossible". Bingo Players, Macklemore & Ryan Lewis, Avicii, Nicky Romero, The Saturdays, PJ & Duncan, Duke Dumont, Daft Punk, Naughty Boy, Robin Thicke, Icona Pop, John Newman, Miley Cyrus, Ellie Goulding, OneRepublic, Lorde, Storm Queen, Martin Garrix, Alesso and Sam Bailey have all claimed their first number 1 single as a lead artist.

In the albums chart, Emeli Sandé, Calvin Harris and Mumford & Sons returned to the top of the charts, having reached number one in 2012 with Our Version of Events, 18 Months and Babel. Biffy Clyro, Bastille, Rudimental, Caro Emerald, Daft Punk, Disclosure, Tom Odell, JAY Z, Robin Thicke, Jahméne Douglas, Richard & Adam, Avenged Sevenfold, The 1975, Haim, Miley Cyrus and John Newman have all claimed their first number 1 album.

Emeli Sandé continued her chart success in the albums chart when her album Our Version of Events, which was the biggest selling album in 2012 was also the biggest selling album in 2013 throughout its entirety until it was surpassed during the final week of 2013 by One Direction's third album Midnight Memories, which ended the year as 2013's biggest selling album, pushing Sandé into second place.

"Blurred Lines" by Robin Thicke featuring T.I. & Pharrell Williams has spent the most weeks at number one in the singles with five and Les Misérables by Les Misérables, Our Version of Events by Emeli Sandé and The Impossible Dream by Richard & Adam have all spent the most weeks at number one in the albums with four.

== Chart achievements ==
X Factor 2013 winner Sam Bailey scored the Christmas number-one single of 2013. The single sold 148,853 copies in its first week to become the lowest-selling Christmas number one since Robbie Williams & Nicole Kidman scored Christmas number 1 in 2001 when "Somethin' Stupid" sold 110,000 copies in the Christmas week and also, the second lowest-selling X Factor winner's single.

== Number ones ==
=== Number-one singles ===
Key
†	Best-selling single of the year

Chart date (week ending)	Song	Artist(s)	Sales	References
5 January	"Impossible"	James Arthur	183,660	
12 January	"Impossible"	James Arthur	73,778	
19 January	"Scream & Shout"	will.i.am featuring Britney Spears	62,250	
26 January	"Scream & Shout"	will.i.am featuring Britney Spears	54,823	
2 February	"Get Up (Rattle)"	Bingo Players featuring Far East Movement	74,061	
9 February	"Get Up (Rattle)"	Bingo Players featuring Far East Movement	51,450	
16 February	"Thrift Shop"	Macklemore & Ryan Lewis featuring Wanz	83,672	
23 February	"I Could Be the One"	Avicii vs Nicky Romero	90,999	
2 March	"One Way or Another (Teenage Kicks)"	One Direction	112,616	
9 March	"Mirrors"	Justin Timberlake	85,918	
16 March	"Mirrors"	Justin Timberlake	66,572	
23 March	"Mirrors"	Justin Timberlake	69,240	
30 March	"What About Us"	The Saturdays featuring Sean Paul	114,259	
6 April	"Let's Get Ready to Rhumble"	PJ & Duncan	83,748	
13 April	"Need U (100%)"	Duke Dumont featuring A*M*E	92,179	
20 April	"Need U (100%)"	Duke Dumont featuring A*M*E	58,321	
27 April	"Waiting All Night"	Rudimental featuring Ella Eyre	107,099	
4 May	"Get Lucky"	Daft Punk featuring Pharrell Williams & Nile Rodgers	155,215	
11 May	"Get Lucky"	Daft Punk featuring Pharrell Williams & Nile Rodgers	163,384	
18 May	"Get Lucky"	Daft Punk featuring Pharrell Williams & Nile Rodgers	123,112	
25 May	"Get Lucky"	Daft Punk featuring Pharrell Williams & Nile Rodgers	113,883	
1 June	"La La La"	Naughty Boy featuring Sam Smith	145,326	
8 June	"Blurred Lines" †	Robin Thicke featuring T.I. & Pharrell Williams	190,572	
15 June	"Blurred Lines" †	Robin Thicke featuring T.I. & Pharrell Williams	198,856	
22 June	"Blurred Lines" †	Robin Thicke featuring T.I. & Pharrell Williams	193,783	
29 June	"Blurred Lines" †	Robin Thicke featuring T.I. & Pharrell Williams	133,052	
6 July	"I Love It"	Icona Pop featuring Charli XCX	124,890	
13 July	"Love Me Again"	John Newman	124,885	
20 July	"Blurred Lines" †	Robin Thicke featuring T.I. & Pharrell Williams	82,593	
27 July	"Wake Me Up"	Avicii featuring Aloe Blacc	266,524	
3 August	"Wake Me Up"	Avicii featuring Aloe Blacc	154,525	
10 August	"Wake Me Up"	Avicii featuring Aloe Blacc	124,356	
17 August	"We Can't Stop"	Miley Cyrus	128,159	
24 August	"Burn"	Ellie Goulding	116,857	
31 August	"Burn"	Ellie Goulding	80,095	
7 September	"Burn"	Ellie Goulding	62,270	
14 September	"Roar"	Katy Perry	179,534	
21 September	"Roar"	Katy Perry	103,444	
28 September	"Talk Dirty"	Jason Derulo featuring 2 Chainz	159,888	
5 October	"Talk Dirty"	Jason Derulo featuring 2 Chainz	75,732	
12 October	"Counting Stars"	OneRepublic	67,880	
19 October	"Wrecking Ball"	Miley Cyrus	107,362	
26 October	"Counting Stars"	OneRepublic	65,981	
2 November	"Royals"	Lorde	82,551	
9 November	"The Monster"	Eminem featuring Rihanna	74,674	
16 November	"Look Right Through"	Storm Queen	105,559	
23 November	"Animals"	Martin Garrix	105,767	
30 November	"Somewhere Only We Know"	Lily Allen	80,917	
7 December	"Under Control"	Calvin Harris & Alesso featuring Hurts	74,704	
14 December	"Somewhere Only We Know"	Lily Allen	46,279	
21 December	"Somewhere Only We Know"	Lily Allen	47,676	
28 December	"Skyscraper"	Sam Bailey	148,853	

=== Number-one albums ===
Key
†	Best-selling album of the year

Chart Date (week ending)	Album	Artist	Sales	References
5 January	Our Version of Events	Emeli Sandé	72,763	
12 January	18 Months	Calvin Harris	35,946	
19 January	Our Version of Events	Emeli Sandé	30,045	
26 January	Les Misérables	Les Misérables	55,954	
2 February	Les Misérables	Les Misérables	48,392	
9 February	Opposites	Biffy Clyro	71,584	
16 February	Les Misérables	Les Misérables	35,834	
23 February	Les Misérables	Les Misérables	39,101	
2 March	Our Version of Events	Emeli Sandé	39,856	
9 March	Our Version of Events	Emeli Sandé	38,929	
16 March	Bad Blood	Bastille	56,572	
23 March	The Next Day	David Bowie	94,048	
30 March	The 20/20 Experience	Justin Timberlake	105,888	
6 April	The 20/20 Experience	Justin Timberlake	56,147	
13 April	The 20/20 Experience	Justin Timberlake	26,242	
20 April	Paramore	Paramore	39,234	
27 April	To Be Loved	Michael Bublé	121,415	
4 May	To Be Loved	Michael Bublé	46,018	
11 May	Home	Rudimental	63,363	
18 May	The Shocking Miss Emerald	Caro Emerald	34,246	
25 May	Time	Rod Stewart	57,628	
1 June	Random Access Memories	Daft Punk	165,091	
8 June	Random Access Memories	Daft Punk	52,801	
15 June	Settle	Disclosure	44,633	
22 June	13	Black Sabbath	47,694	
29 June	Yeezus	Kanye West	25,400	
6 July	Long Way Down	Tom Odell	43,764	
13 July	Babel	Mumford & Sons	25,580	
20 July	Magna Carta... Holy Grail	JAY Z	39,386	
27 July	Blurred Lines	Robin Thicke	25,981	
3 August	Love Never Fails	Jahméne Douglas	18,904	
10 August	The Impossible Dream	Richard & Adam	28,982	
17 August	The Impossible Dream	Richard & Adam	24,864	
24 August	The Impossible Dream	Richard & Adam	19,325	
31 August	The Impossible Dream	Richard & Adam	17,664	
7 September	Hail To The King	Avenged Sevenfold	21,147	
14 September	The 1975	The 1975	31,538	
21 September	AM	Arctic Monkeys	157,329	
28 September	AM	Arctic Monkeys	57,486	
5 October	Mechanical Bull	Kings of Leon	71,765	
12 October	Days Are Gone	Haim	37,005	
19 October	Bangerz	Miley Cyrus	30,759	
26 October	Tribute	John Newman	29,756	
2 November	PRISM	Katy Perry	53,827	
9 November	Reflektor	Arcade Fire	45,252	
16 November	The Marshall Mathers LP 2	Eminem	143,034	
23 November	ARTPOP	Lady Gaga	65,608	
30 November	Swings Both Ways	Robbie Williams	108,622	
7 December	Midnight Memories †	One Direction	237,338	
14 December	Midnight Memories †	One Direction	124,535	
21 December	Swings Both Ways	Robbie Williams	126,168	
28 December	Swings Both Ways	Robbie Williams	126,330	

=== Number-one single downloads ===
Chart date (week ending)	Song	Artist(s)	References
5 January	"Impossible"	James Arthur	
12 January	"Scream & Shout"	will.i.am featuring Britney Spears	
19 January	"Scream & Shout"	will.i.am featuring Britney Spears	
26 January	"Scream & Shout"	will.i.am featuring Britney Spears	
2 February	"Get Up (Rattle)"	Bingo Players featuring Far East Movement	
9 February	"Get Up (Rattle)"	Bingo Players featuring Far East Movement	
16 February	"Thrift Shop"	Macklemore & Ryan Lewis featuring Wanz	
23 February	"I Could Be the One"	Avicii vs Nicky Romero	
2 March	"One Way or Another (Teenage Kicks)"	One Direction	
9 March	"Mirrors"	Justin Timberlake	
16 March	"Mirrors"	Justin Timberlake	
23 March	"Mirrors"	Justin Timberlake	
30 March	"What About Us"	The Saturdays featuring Sean Paul	
6 April	"Let's Get Ready to Rhumble"	PJ & Duncan	
13 April	"Need U (100%)"	Duke Dumont featuring A*M*E	
20 April	"Need U (100%)"	Duke Dumont featuring A*M*E	
27 April	"Waiting All Night"	Rudimental featuring Ella Eyre	
4 May	"Get Lucky"	Daft Punk featuring Pharrell Williams & Nile Rodgers	
11 May	"Get Lucky"	Daft Punk featuring Pharrell Williams & Nile Rodgers	
18 May	"Get Lucky"	Daft Punk featuring Pharrell Williams & Nile Rodgers	
25 May	"Get Lucky"	Daft Punk featuring Pharrell Williams & Nile Rodgers	
1 June	"La La La"	Naughty Boy featuring Sam Smith	
8 June	"Blurred Lines"	Robin Thicke featuring T.I. & Pharrell Williams	
15 June	"Blurred Lines"	Robin Thicke featuring T.I. & Pharrell Williams	
22 June	"Blurred Lines"	Robin Thicke featuring T.I. & Pharrell Williams	
29 June	"Blurred Lines"	Robin Thicke featuring T.I. & Pharrell Williams	
6 July	"I Love It"	Icona Pop featuring Charli XCX	
13 July	"Love Me Again"	John Newman	
20 July	"Blurred Lines"	Robin Thicke featuring T.I. & Pharrell Williams	
27 July	"Wake Me Up"	Avicii featuring Aloe Blacc	
3 August	"Wake Me Up"	Avicii featuring Aloe Blacc	
10 August	"Wake Me Up"	Avicii featuring Aloe Blacc	
17 August	"We Can't Stop"	Miley Cyrus	
24 August	"Burn"	Ellie Goulding	
31 August	"Burn"	Ellie Goulding	
7 September	"Burn"	Ellie Goulding	
14 September	"Roar"	Katy Perry	
21 September	"Roar"	Katy Perry	
28 September	"Talk Dirty"	Jason Derulo featuring 2 Chainz	
5 October	"Talk Dirty"	Jason Derulo featuring 2 Chainz	
12 October	"Counting Stars"	OneRepublic	
19 October	"Wrecking Ball"	Miley Cyrus	
26 October	"Counting Stars"	OneRepublic	
2 November	"Royals"	Lorde	
9 November	"The Monster"	Eminem featuring Rihanna	
16 November	"Look Right Through"	Storm Queen	
23 November	"Animals"	Martin Garrix	
30 November	"Of The Night"	Bastille	
7 December	"Under Control"	Calvin Harris & Alesso featuring Hurts	
14 December	"Story Of My Life"	One Direction	
21 December	"Hey Brother"	Avicii	
28 December	"Skyscraper"	Sam Bailey	

=== Number-one album downloads ===
Chart date (week ending)	Album	Artist	References
5 January	Now 83	Various Artists	
12 January	Now 83	Various Artists	
19 January	18 Months	Calvin Harris	
26 January	Les Misérables	Les Misérables	
2 February	Les Misérables	Les Misérables	
9 February	Opposites	Biffy Clyro	
16 February	Jake Bugg	Jake Bugg	
23 February	Holy Fire	Foals	
2 March	Babel	Mumford & Sons	
9 March	Our Version of Events	Emeli Sandé	
16 March	Bad Blood	Bastille	
23 March	The Next Day	David Bowie	
30 March	The 20/20 Experience	Justin Timberlake	
6 April	Now 84	Various Artists	
13 April	Now 84	Various Artists	
20 April	Paramore	Paramore	
27 April	To Be Loved	Michael Bublé	
4 May	Tape Deck Heart	Frank Turner	
11 May	Home	Rudimental	
18 May	Home	Rudimental	
25 May	English Rain	Gabrielle Aplin	
1 June	Random Access Memories	Daft Punk	
8 June	Random Access Memories	Daft Punk	
15 June	Settle	Disclosure	
22 June	Settle	Disclosure	
29 June	Yeezus	Kanye West	
6 July	Long Way Down	Tom Odell	
13 July	Babel	Mumford & Sons	
20 July	Magna Carta... Holy Grail	JAY Z	
27 July	Magna Carta... Holy Grail	JAY Z	
3 August	Now 85	Various Artists	
10 August	Now 85	Various Artists	
17 August	Now 85	Various Artists	
24 August	Now 85	Various Artists	
31 August	Teenage Dirtbags	Various Artists	
7 September	Teenage Dirtbags	Various Artists	
14 September	The 1975	The 1975	
21 September	AM	Arctic Monkeys	
28 September	AM	Arctic Monkeys	
5 October	Nothing Was the Same	Drake	
12 October	The 20/20 Experience – 2 of 2	Justin Timberlake	
19 October	Bangerz	Miley Cyrus	
26 October	Tribute	John Newman	
2 November	Prism	Katy Perry	
9 November	Reflektor	Arcade Fire	
16 November	The Marshall Mathers LP 2	Eminem	
23 November	Artpop	Lady Gaga	
30 November	Now 86	Various Artists	
7 December	Midnight Memories	One Direction	
14 December	Now Christmas	Various Artists	
21 December	Beyoncé	Beyoncé	
28 December	Beyoncé	Beyoncé	

=== Number-one compilation albums ===
Key
†	Best-selling compilation of the year

Chart date (week ending)	Album	References
5 January	Now 83	
12 January	Now 83	
19 January	Now 83	
26 January	Now 83	
2 February	The Trevor Nelson Collection	
9 February	The Trevor Nelson Collection	
16 February	The Trevor Nelson Collection	
23 February	The Trevor Nelson Collection	
2 March	BRIT Awards 2013	
9 March	BRIT Awards 2013	
16 March	The Trevor Nelson Collection	
23 March	The Trevor Nelson Collection	
30 March	Pop Party 11	
6 April	Now 84	
13 April	Now 84	
20 April	Now 84	
27 April	Now 84	
4 May	Now 84	
11 May	Now 84	
18 May	Now 84	
25 May	Now 84	
1 June	Now 84	
8 June	Now 30 Years	
15 June	Now 30 Years	
22 June	Eddie Stobart - Trucking Songs	
29 June	Now 30 Years	
6 July	Clubland 23	
13 July	Chilled R&B - The Platinum Edition	
20 July	#HolidayAnthems	
27 July	#HolidayAnthems	
3 August	Now 85	
10 August	Now 85	
17 August	Now 85	
24 August	Now 85	
31 August	Now 85	
7 September	Now 85	
14 September	Now 85	
21 September	Now 85	
28 September	Now 85	
5 October	Now 85	
12 October	Now 85	
19 October	Now 85	
26 October	Now 80s Dance	
2 November	Now 85	
9 November	BBC Radio 1's Live Lounge 2013	
16 November	BBC Radio 1's Live Lounge 2013	
23 November	Pop Party 12	
30 November	Now 86 †	
7 December	Now 86 †	
14 December	Now 86 †	
21 December	Now 86 †	
28 December	Now 86 †	

== Year-end charts ==
=== Best-selling singles ===
No.	Title	Artist	Peak position	Sales
1	"Blurred Lines"	Robin Thicke featuring T.I. & Pharrell Williams	1	1,472,681
2	"Get Lucky"	Daft Punk featuring Pharrell Williams & Nile Rodgers	1	1,308,007
3	"Wake Me Up"	Avicii featuring Aloe Blacc	1	1,180,000
4	"Let Her Go"	Passenger	2	1,030,000
5	"La La La"	Naughty Boy featuring Sam Smith	1	941,000
6	"Roar"	Katy Perry	1	
7	"Thrift Shop"	Macklemore & Ryan Lewis featuring Wanz	1	
8	"Just Give Me a Reason"	Pink featuring Nate Ruess	2	
9	"Counting Stars"	OneRepublic	1	
10	"Mirrors"	Justin Timberlake	1	710,000
11	"Pompeii"	Bastille	2	
12	"Waiting All Night"	Rudimental featuring Ella Eyre	1	
13	"Can't Hold Us"	Macklemore & Ryan Lewis featuring Ray Dalton	3	
14	"Love Me Again"	John Newman	1	
15	"Burn"	Ellie Goulding	1	
16	"When I Was Your Man"	Bruno Mars	2	
17	"I Knew You Were Trouble"	Taylor Swift	2	
18	"Scream & Shout"	will.i.am featuring Britney Spears	1	
19	"I Love It"	Icona Pop featuring Charli XCX	1	
20	"Dear Darlin'"	Olly Murs	5	507,000
21	"Ho Hey"	The Lumineers	12 (Note: Reached number 8 in 2012)	
22	"Stay"	Rihanna featuring Mikky Ekko	4	
23	"Summertime Sadness"	Lana Del Rey vs. Cedric Gervais	4	
24	"One Way or Another (Teenage Kicks)"	One Direction	1	
25	"Talk Dirty"	Jason Derulo featuring 2 Chainz	1	
26	"The Monster"	Eminem featuring Rihanna	1	
27	"I Could Be the One"	Avicii vs Nicky Romero	1	
28	"We Can't Stop"	Miley Cyrus	1	
29	"White Noise"	Disclosure featuring AlunaGeorge	2	
30	"Radioactive"	Imagine Dragons	12	
31	"Hold On, We're Going Home"	Drake featuring Majid Jordan	4	
32	"I Need Your Love"	Calvin Harris featuring Ellie Goulding	4	
33	"Bang Bang"	will.i.am	3	
34	"Somewhere Only We Know"	Lily Allen	1	
35	"Need U (100%)"	Duke Dumont featuring A*M*E	1	
36	"Play Hard"	David Guetta featuring Ne-Yo & Akon	6	
37	"What About Us"	The Saturdays featuring Sean Paul	1	
38	"Wild"	Jessie J featuring Big Sean & Dizzee Rascal	5	
39	"The Other Side"	Jason Derulo	2	
40	"Drinking from the Bottle"	Calvin Harris featuring Tinie Tempah	5	
41	"Wrecking Ball"	Miley Cyrus	1	
42	"Impossible"	James Arthur	1	
43	"Hey Porsche"	Nelly	6	
44	"Royals"	Lorde	1	
45	"Clown"	Emeli Sandé	4	
46	"Story of My Life"	One Direction	2	
47	"Locked Out of Heaven"	Bruno Mars	4 (Note: Reached number 2 in 2012)	
48	"How Long Will I Love You"	Ellie Goulding	3	
49	"Gangnam Style"	Psy	3 (Note: Reached number 1 in 2012)	
50	"Best Song Ever"	One Direction	2	

=== Best-selling artist albums ===
No.	Title	Artist	Peak position	Sales
1	Midnight Memories	One Direction	1	684,754
2	Our Version of Events	Emeli Sandé	1	682,908
3	To Be Loved	Michael Bublé	1	631,224
4	Swings Both Ways	Robbie Williams	1	626,465
5	Right Place Right Time	Olly Murs	2 (Note: Reached number 1 in 2012)	622,643
6	Unorthodox Jukebox	Bruno Mars	4 (Note: Reached number 1 in 2012)	
7	Time	Rod Stewart	1	
8	AM	Arctic Monkeys	1	
9	Since I Saw You Last	Gary Barlow	2	
10	Halcyon	Ellie Goulding	3 (Note: Reached number 1 in 2014)	
11	Bad Blood	Bastille	1	
12	Les Misérables: Highlights from the Motion Picture Soundtrack	Les Misérables	1	
13	The Marshall Mathers LP 2	Eminem	1	
14	Jake Bugg	Jake Bugg	2 (Note: Reached number 1 in 2012)	
15	Babel	Mumford & Sons	1	
16	Random Access Memories	Daft Punk	1	
17	Home	Rudimental	1	
18	18 Months	Calvin Harris	1	
19	All the Little Lights	Passenger	3	
20	The Truth About Love	Pink	3 (Note: Reached number 2 in 2012)	
21	The 20/20 Experience	Justin Timberlake	1	
22	Take Me Home	One Direction	6 (Note: Reached number 1 in 2012)	
23	Loved Me Back to Life	Céline Dion	3	
24	Graffiti on the Train	Stereophonics	3	
25	The Nation's Favourite Elvis Songs	Elvis Presley	5	
26	The Next Day	David Bowie	1	
27	Red	Taylor Swift	7 (Note: Reached number 1 in 2012)	
28	Prism	Katy Perry	1	
29	Christmas	Michael Bublé	4 (Note: Reached number 1 in 2011)	
30	James Arthur	James Arthur	2	
31	The Lumineers	The Lumineers	8	
32	Night Visions	Imagine Dragons	2	
33	If You Wait	London Grammar	2	
34	Long Way Down	Tom Odell	1	
35	Opposites	Biffy Clyro	1	
36	Mechanical Bull	Kings of Leon	1	
37	Moon Landing	James Blunt	2	
38	Every Kingdom	Ben Howard	4	
39	Unapologetic	Rihanna	3 (Note: Reached number 1 in 2012)	
40	Settle	Disclosure	1	
41	Beyoncé	Beyoncé	4	
42	Up All Night	One Direction	23 (Note: Reached number 2 in 2011)	
43	Nothing But the Beat	David Guetta	6 (Note: Reached number 2 in 2011)	
44	Music of the Night	André Rieu	4	
45	Salute	Little Mix	4	
46	The Shocking Miss Emerald	Caro Emerald	1	
47	+	Ed Sheeran	3 (Note: Reached number 1 in 2011)	
48	Decade in the Sun: Best of Stereophonics	Stereophonics	21 (Note: Reached number 2 in 2008)	
49	Direct Hits	The Killers	6	
50	The Impossible Dream	Richard & Adam	1	

=== Best-selling compilation albums ===
No.	Album	Peak	Sales
1	Now 86	1	1,111,701
2	Now 85	1	933,416
3	Now 84	1	732,950
4	Now Christmas	2	
5	The Trevor Nelson Collection	1	
6	BBC Radio 1's Live Lounge 2013	1	
7	Now 30 Years	1	
8	Anthems – Trance	3	
9	Pop Party 12	1	
10	Eddie Stobart – Trucking Songs	1	

== See also ==
- 2013 in British music
- List of 2013 albums
- List of UK top 10 singles in 2013
