= Love This Town =

Single by Dizzee Rascal featuring Teddy Sky

from the album The Fifth
- Released: 29 November 2013
- Recorded: 2012
- Genre: Hip house, Eurodance, dance-pop
- Length: 4:00
- Label: Dirtee Stank; Island Records
- Songwriter(s): Dylan Mills; Teddy Sky; RedOne; Jimmy Joker; Eric Sanicola
- Producer(s): RedOne; Teddy Sky; Eric Sanicola; Jimmy Joker

Dizzee Rascal singles chronology
"Something Really Bad" (2013)	"Love This Town" (2013)	"Still Sittin' Here" (2014)

"Love This Town" is a song by Dizzee Rascal, featuring vocals from Teddy Sky. The song was written by Dylan Mills, Teddy Sky, RedOne, Jimmy Joker and Eric Sanicola. The song was released on 29 November 2013 as a digital download in the United Kingdom as the third single from his fifth studio album, The Fifth (2013). The song has peaked at number 35 on the UK Singles Chart and number 34 on the Scottish Singles Chart.

== Track listings ==
Digital download
No.	Title	Length
1.	"Love This Town" (feat. Teddy Bear Sky)	4:00

Digital download – Remixes
No.	Title	Length
1.	"Love This Town" (feat. Teddy Sky) (Ray Foxx Remix)	7:22
2.	"Love This Town" (feat. Teddy Sky) (Zinc Remix)	4:38
3.	"Love This Town" (feat. Teddy Sky) (Instrumental)	3:58

== Credits and personnel ==
- Vocals – Dizzee Rascal, Teddy Sky
- Lyrics – Dylan Mills, Teddy Sky, RedOne, Jimmy Joker, Eric Sanicola
- Producer – RedOne, Teddy Sky, Eric Sanicola, Jimmy Joker
- Label: Dirtee Stank, Island Records

== Chart performance ==
=== Weekly charts ===
Chart (2013)	Peak position
Scotland (OCC)	34
UK Hip Hop/R&B (OCC)	5
UK Singles (OCC)	35

== Release history ==
Region	Date	Format	Label
United Kingdom	29 November 2013	Digital download	Dirtee Stank, Island Records
