= We Own It (Fast & Furious) =

2013 single by 2 Chainz and Wiz Khalifa

Single by 2 Chainz and Wiz Khalifa

from the album Fast & Furious 6 (Original Motion Picture Soundtrack) and B.O.A.T.S. II: Me Time (International Version)
- Released: June 12, 2013
- Genre: Hip hop
- Length: 3:47
- Label: Def Jam
- Songwriters: Tauheed Epps; Cameron Jabril Thomaz; Alex Schwartz; Joe Khajadourian; Breyan Stanley Isaac
- Producer: The Futuristics

2 Chainz singles chronology
"Rich As Fuck" (2013)	"We Own It (Fast & Furious)" (2013)	"Headband" (2013)

Wiz Khalifa singles chronology
"Beat It" (2013)	"We Own It (Fast & Furious)" (2013)	"23" (2013)

"We Own It (Fast & Furious)" is a song by American rappers 2 Chainz and Wiz Khalifa that appears on the Fast & Furious 6 soundtrack. The song appears in the opening and end credits of the film. The song was also included as an international bonus track on 2 Chainz' second studio album B.O.A.T.S. II: Me Time. The song was used as the official theme for WWE's Royal Rumble 2014 event, as Chicago Cubs 3rd baseman Kris Bryant's walk-up song, and it was also featured on an episode of Parks and Recreation.

On June 27, 2013, Mike Posner created a remix version featuring Travis Mills, Sammy Adams, and Niykee Heaton.

== Commercial performance ==
It reached number six on the UK Singles Chart, becoming 2 Chainz's most successful single in that country. On the week of June 8, 2013, it debuted on the US Billboard Hot 100 at number 61. It peaked at number 16. The single was certified 3× platinum by the Recording Industry Association of America and has sold over 3 million copies in the United States.

== Charts ==
=== Weekly charts ===
Weekly chart performance for "We Own It"
Chart (2013)	Peak position
Australia (ARIA)	6
Austria (Ö3 Austria Top 40)	7
Belgium (Ultratop 50 Flanders)	19
Belgium (Ultratop 50 Wallonia)	29
Canada Hot 100 (Billboard)	14
Czech Republic Airplay (ČNS IFPI)	41
Denmark (Tracklisten)	15
France (SNEP)	9
Germany (GfK)	5
Ireland (IRMA)	21
Italy (FIMI)	9
Luxembourg Digital Songs (Billboard)	3
Netherlands (Single Top 100)	48
New Zealand (Recorded Music NZ)	6
Norway (VG-lista)	10
Poland Airplay (ZPAV)	19
Poland (Video Chart)	5
Russia Airplay (TopHit)	30
Slovakia Airplay (ČNS IFPI)	50
Scottish Singles Sales (Official Charts)	7
Spain (Promusicae)	31
Sweden (Sverigetopplistan)	38
Switzerland (Schweizer Hitparade)	3
UK Hip Hop/R&B (Official Charts)	2
UK Singles (Official Charts)	6
US Billboard Hot 100	16
US Hot R&B/Hip-Hop Songs (Billboard)	4
US Hot Rap Songs (Billboard)	3

=== Year-end charts ===
Annual chart rankings for "We Own It"
Chart (2013)	Position
Australia (ARIA)	88
Austria (Ö3 Austria Top 40)	72
Belgium (Ultratop Flanders)	88
France (SNEP)	88
Germany (Media Control AG)	76
Italy (Musica e dischi)	88
Switzerland (Schweizer Hitparade)	74
UK Singles (Official Charts Company)	97
US Hot R&B/Hip-Hop Songs (Billboard)	66
Chart (2014)	Position
Russia Airplay (TopHit)	134

== Certifications ==
Region	Certification	Certified units/sales
Australia (ARIA)	3× Platinum	210,000^{‡}
Brazil (Pro-Música Brasil)	Platinum	60,000^{‡}
Germany (BVMI)	3× Gold	450,000^{‡}
Italy (FIMI)	Gold	50,000^{‡}
New Zealand (RMNZ)	Platinum	15,000^{*}
Sweden (GLF)	Gold	20,000^{‡}
United Kingdom (BPI)	Gold	400,000^{‡}
United States (RIAA)	3× Platinum	1,370,000
Streaming
Denmark (IFPI Danmark)	Platinum	1,800,000^{†}
^{*} Sales figures based on certification alone.^{‡} Sales+streaming figures based on certification alone.^{†} Streaming-only figures based on certification alone.

== Radio and release history ==
Country	Date	Format	Label
United Kingdom	June 12, 2013	Contemporary hit radio	Def Jam Recordings
