= Charlie Brown (singer) =

British singer and songwriter (born 1986)

- Born: 20 October 1986 (age 39); London, United Kingdom
- Genres: R&B
- Occupation: Singer-songwriter
- Years active: 2012–present
- Website: www.twitter.com/charliebrownldn

Charlie Brown (born 20 October 1986) is a British singer and songwriter from London. He supported N-Dubz star Dappy on his UK tour in 2012. His single "On My Way" was released by All Around the World Productions.

== Career ==
=== 2012–present: Breakthrough ===
On 2 December 2012, Brown released his debut single "Dependency", the song features vocals from Yungen and Ms D. He released his second single "She Makes Me" on 19 December 2012. He released the single "On My Way" which was released by All Around the World Productions on 24 March 2013, the song peaked at number seven on the UK Singles Chart, making it his first and only top ten single. In July 2013 he released the single "Floodgates". On 8 June he had duetted with Misha B on "Floodgates Part 2", which was officially released 21 July. He released the single "Bones" on 13 October 2013.

== Discography ==
=== Singles ===
Year	Title	Peak chart positions							Album
Year	Title	UK	AUS	BEL	CZE	IRL	SCO	SLO	Album
2012	"Dependency" (featuring Yungen and Ms D)	—	—	—	—	—	—	—	non-album singles
2012	"She Makes Me"	—	—	—	—	—	—	—	non-album singles
2013	"On My Way"	7	73	58	35	75	10	26	non-album singles
2013	"Floodgates"	—	—	—	—	—	—	—	non-album singles
2013	"Bones"	—	—	—	—	—	—	—	non-album singles
"—" denotes single that did not chart or was not released in that territory.

== Music videos ==
Year	Title
2012	"Dependency"
2012	"She Makes Me"
2013	"On My Way"
2013	"Floodgates (Part 2)" (featuring Misha B)
2013	"Bones"
