= Ben Westbeech =

British DJ and record producer (born 1981)

- Also known as: Breach, Lean
- Born: 17 April 1981 (age 45); Hertfordshire, England
- Origin: Bristol, England
- Genres: Electronic, house, jazz fusion
- Occupations: Producer, DJ
- Instrument: Keyboards • vocals
- Years active: 2006–present
- Labels: Trademark of Energy Production Srl, Brownswood Recordings, Naked Naked, Dirtybird, Glitterbox Recordings Defected Records

Ben Westbeech (born 17 April 1981), also known as Breach as well as his collaborative project The Vision, is a British DJ and record producer originating from Hertfordshire who spent his formative musical years in Bristol. Trained as cellist and vocalist, his influences include house, soul, jazz and hip hop.

== Music career ==
=== Early career: 2007–08 ===
Westbeech gave a CD containing his first single, "So Good Today," to a friend in London. Two months later, the track was played to Gilles Peterson, who signed him to the newly established Brownswood Recordings. His debut album Welcome to the Best Years of Your Life was released in March 2007. He later appeared on Later... with Jools Holland alongside Paul McCartney and Björk. He also appeared on the track "Squeeze Me" on Kraak & Smaak's album Plastic People, released in April 2008.

=== There's More To Life Than This: 2009–11 ===
More recently, he appeared on the track "I Can See", which was the main single for Jazzanova's album titled Of All The Things, released in January 2009 on Verve/Universal. Ben also sang on the song "Shame" for DJ Marky and Artificial Intelligence. Westbeech is working with Professor Green (producing for his new record), Kutz (Soul Jazz), Redlight (Lobster Boy) and Rusko (Mad Decent). He released his second album, There's More To Life Than This on Strictly Rhythm in September 2011. The record features collaborators including Soul Clap, Henrik Schwarz, MJ Cole, Motor City Drum Ensemble and Georg Levin.< described it as "house inspired, rather than straight up house music". Westbeech also produces and DJs under the moniker Breach. Under the "Breach" moniker, he produced the track "Fatherless" released on PTN in 2010. Breach has released music on Claude VonStroke's Dirtybird label and Pet's (Catz n Dogz' label). Westbeech also wrote the vocal for Redlight's Breakthrough hit "Get Out My Head" featuring Nicole Jackson. He also owns the record label "Naked Naked" which releases tracks from Breach, Midland, Dusky and Dark Sky.

=== 2013–2014: Breakthrough ===
In June 2013, Westbeech's remix of Maya Jane Coles' "Everything" featuring Karin Park was released through I/AM/ME.

In July 2013, under the name "Breach" he released his first successful single on the UK Singles Chart, "Jack", peaking at 9. The follow-up single, "Everything You Never Had (We Had It All)" featuring Andreya Triana, also peaked at 9.

Breach teamed up with American singer-songwriter Kelis on the track "The Key", which was released on 14 December 2014, the week of the UK Christmas singles chart race; the single however failed to chart.The following day, he released the double A-side “Liberty / Avocado” in collaboration with Cinnaman.

=== 2018: Return as Breach ===
Westbeech returned as Breach in 2018 with the Turtle Dance EP, released on August 17. The EP featured the tracks “Turtle Dance” and “S.O.S.T.” 2019–2020: The Vision

In 2019, Westbeech and American DJ Kon debuted a new collaborative project, The Vision. Their first single, “Heaven / Home”, featuring Andreya Triana, was released on July 19, 2019. It was followed by “Mountains” on March 6, 2020, and “Missing” on October 16, 2020. All three singles blended elements of classic soul, disco, and house, and featured live instrumentation and vocal performances. The Vision’s self-titled debut album was released via Defected Records in November 2020.

=== 2023: New Releases with The Vision and Breach ===
In 2023, The Vision returned with the single “Hallelujah In Heaven” featuring Andreya Triana. A Groove Assassin Extended Edit of the track was released on June 2. That same year, Breach reissued a new version of his earlier hit “Jack” titled “Jack (DC Jack Track)” adapting the track for contemporary club settings.

=== 2025: Return to Solo Work ===
On 16 May 2025, Westbeech released Everything Is Within You, his first solo album in 14 years. The album was issued through Glitterbox Recordings (part of Defected Records), and featured collaborations with artists including Obi Franky, RAHH, Dames Brown, Hot Toddy, Karen Harding, Mousse T, and Davie.

== Personal life ==
Westbeech was briefly engaged to actress Rachel Hurd-Wood.

== Discography ==
=== Albums ===
Title	Album details	Notes
Welcome to the Best Years of Your Life	Released: 2007; Format: Digital download, CD	No. / Title / Length; 1. / "Welcome" / 3:39; 2. / "So Good Today" / 2:59; 3. / "Get Silly" / 3:51; 4. / "Bright Future" / 3:52; 5. / "Nothing Else" / 2:44; 6. / "Gotta Keep On" / 2:56; 7. / "Taken Away From" / 2:49; 8. / "Grey Skies" / 1:49; 9. / "Stop What You're Doing" / 2:49; 10. / "Dance With Me" / 4:02; 11. / "Get Closer" / 4:55; 12. / "Hang Around" / 3:38; 13. / "Pusherman" / 3:16; 14. / "In/Out" / 2:44; 15. / "Beauty" / 4:35
There's More To Life Than This	Released: 2011; Format: Digital download, CD	No. / Title / Length; 1. / "The Book" (produced by Georg Levin); 2. / "Something for the Weekend" (produced by Danny J Lewis); 3. / "Falling" (produced by Lovebirds); 4. / "Same Thing" (produced by Chocolate Puma); 5. / "Justice" (produced by Motor City Drum Ensemble); 6. / "Stronger" (produced by Midland); 7. / "Inflections" (produced by Henrik Schwarz); 8. / "Sugar" (produced by Redlight); 9. / "Let Your Feelings Show" (produced by Georg Levin); 10. / "Butterflies" (produced by Rasmus Faber); 11. / "Summer's Loss" (produced by Rasmus Faber)
The Vision (With Kon)	Released: 2020; Format: Digital download, CD, LP	No. / Title / Length; 1. / "Remember" (featuring by Andreya Triana, Nikki-O) / 4:09; 2. / "Mountains" (featuring by Andreya Triana) / 4:03; 3. / "Down" (featuring by Dames Brown) / 3:41; 4. / "Missing" (featuring by Andreya Triana) / 4:41; 5. / "Time" / 0:50; 6. / "Wasting" (featuring by Roy Ayers) / 4:41; 7. / "Believe" / 4:52; 8. / "Façade" / 0:54; 9. / "Paradise" / 5:09; 10. / "Nebulous" / 2:11; 11. / "Satisfy" (featuring by Andreya Triana, Honey Dijon) / 4:58; 12. / "Heaven" (featuring by Andreya Triana) / 4:58; 13. / "Tenacious" / 0:49; 14. / "Home" (featuring by Andreya Triana) / 3:48
Everything Is Within You	Released: 2025; Format: Digital download, CD, LP	No. / Title / Length; 1. / "All In You" (featuring Obi Franky) / 5:33; 2. / "Do Me Right" (featuring RAHH, Dames Brown) / 3:08; 3. / "Free" (featuring RAHH) / 6:11; 4. / "So Good To Me" (featuring Hot Toddy, Karen Harding) / 4:54; 5. / "Whatever Is Missing In You" (featuring RAHH) / 4:28; 6. / "Take It Back" (featuring Mousse T., Davie) / 3:40; 7. / "Time Are Changing" (featuring RAHH, Dames Brown) / 4:52; 8. / "Your Voice" (featuring RAHH, Dames Brown) / 5:16

=== Singles ===
Year	Title	Peak chart positions				Certifications	Album
Year	Title	UK	UK Dance	IRE	SCO	Certifications	Album
2012	"You Won't Find Love Again"	—	—	—	—		Non-album singles
2012	"101 / Somewhere"	—	—	—	—		Non-album singles
2013	"The Click / Fallout"	—	—	—	—		Non-album singles
2013	"Jack"	9	4	74	12	UK: Silver	Non-album singles
2013	"Everything You Never Had (We Had It All)" (featuring Andreya Triana)	9	2	84	13	UK: Silver	Non-album singles
2014	"The Key" (featuring Kelis)	—	—	—	—		Non-album singles

=== Other songs ===
- "Get Closer" (2006)
- "Get Closer" (Rockers Remix) (2006)
- "So Good Today" / "Beauty" (2006)
- "So Good Today (Domu, Osunlade, Yaruba Remixes) (2006)
- "Dance With Me (MJ Cole / Switch Remixes)" (2007)
- "Hang Around" / "Pusherman" (2007)
- "Hang Around (Aaron Ross / Wahoo Remixes)" (2007)
- "Something for the Weekend" (2011)
- "Falling" (2011)
- "Falling" (Deetron, The 2 Bears, Dark Sky Remixes) (2011)
- "Same Thing" (2012)
- "Let's Get Hot" (2013)
- "You Won't Find Love Again" (2013)
- "Heaven" (2019)
- "Heaven" (Mousse T., Nightmares On Wax, Remixes) (2019)
- "Home" (2019)
- "Mountains" (2020)
- "Mountains" (Danny Krivit, Joey Negro, Paul Wooldord, The Patchouli Brothers Remix) (2020)
- "Missing" (2020)
- "Missing" (Deetron, Maurice Fulton Remixes) (2020)
- "Down" (2020)
- "Down (Riva Starr, Natasha Diggs Remixes) (2020)
- "We Rise Above" (2021)
- "Broke" (Ben Westbeech Remix) (2020)
- "Always On My Mind" (2024)
- "Times Are Changing" (2025)
- "Times Are Changing" (Two Soul Fusion Remix)
- "Do Me Right" (2025)
- "Your Voice" (2025)
- "Your Voice" (Crackazat Remixes) (2025)

=== Samples ===
- "Get Silly" samples Ray Barretto's cover of Stevie Wonder's song Pastime Paradise
- "The Reasons Why" samples Tom Brock's There's Nothing In This World That Can Stop Me From Loving You
- "Stop What You're Doing" samples Dionne Warwick's Wives And Lovers
- "Shame" samples The Jone Girls' When I'm Gone
- "Get Closer" samples Linda Williams' Elevate Your Mind
- "Pusherman" samples Lover's Theme by Bob Cunningham
- "Dance With Me" samples James Brown's Get up (I Feel Like Being A) Sex Machine
