= Something Really Bad =

Single by Dizzee Rascal featuring will.i.am

from the album The Fifth
- Released: 29 September 2013
- Recorded: 2012
- Genre: Grime; electro house
- Length: 3:40
- Label: Dirtee Stank; Island
- Songwriter(s): Dylan Mills; Jean Baptiste; William Adams; Jonas Jeberg
- Producer(s): Jonas Jeberg

Dizzee Rascal singles chronology
"Goin' Crazy" (2013)	"Something Really Bad" (2013)	"Love This Town" (2013)

will.i.am singles chronology
"Fall Down" (2013)	"Something Really Bad" (2013)	"Feelin' Myself" (2013)

"Something Really Bad" is a song by English rapper Dizzee Rascal, featuring vocals from American recording artist will.i.am. The song was written by Dylan Mills, Jean Baptiste, William Adams, and Jonas Jeberg (producer). The song was released on 29 September 2013 as a digital download in the United Kingdom as the second single from his fifth studio album, The Fifth (2013). The single peaked at number ten on the UK Singles Chart.

== Music video ==
The music video for "Something Really Bad" was uploaded to YouTube on 2 September 2013 at a length of three minutes and fifty-two seconds.

== Track listings ==
Digital download
No.	Title	Length
1.	"Something Really Bad" (feat. will.i.am)	3:40

== Credits and personnel ==
- Vocals – Dizzee Rascal, will.i.am, Julie Katske
- Lyrics – Dylan Mills, Jean Baptiste, William Adams, Jonas Jeberg
- Producer – Jonas Jeberg
- Label: Dirtee Stank, Island Records

== Chart performance ==
=== Weekly charts ===
Chart (2013)	Peak position
Belgium (Ultratip Bubbling Under Flanders)	54
Germany (GfK)	65
Scotland (OCC)	9
UK Singles (OCC)	10

== Release history ==
Region	Date	Format	Label
United Kingdom	29 September 2013	Digital download	Dirtee Stank, Island Records
