= Jack (song) =

Single by Breach
- B-side: "Let's Get Hot"
- Released: 12 July 2013
- Genre: Deep house; tech house
- Length: 3:03
- Label: Dirtybird; Warner; Atlantic
- Songwriter: Ben Westbeech
- Producer: Breach

Breach singles chronology
| "The Click / Fallout" (2013) | "Jack" (2013) | "Everything You Never Had (We Had It All)" (2013) |

"Jack" is a song by British record producer Breach. It was released through Dirtybird Records as a single on 12 July 2013, and peaked at number 9 in the UK Singles Chart.

== Music video ==
The official music video was released on 14 June 2013.

The music video follows a woman and a man with a mustache who appear to be lip-synching the song. Next appears a man dressed as a caveman with a furry skirt. He carries a box in with a lever that switches their hair to where there shouldn't have hair and vice versa. The caveman then presses the 'Automatic' button which continues the switching back and forth, also allowing him to perform a tightly choreographed and energetic dance accompanied by a blonde female. After that the man picks the 'Ginger' option. This is followed by a cut-scene in which a red-haired lady climbs all over an orange (ginger), hairy armchair, with huge scissors and hairspray. Then after this scene the video returns to 'Automatic'. The hair reversal ends when the Asian woman blows and pops a piece of bubble gum.

As of 9 November 2021, it has over 14 million views.

== Track listing ==
Digital download - single
| No. | Title | Length |
|---|---|---|
| 1. | "Jack" | 5:13 |

Digital download - EP
| No. | Title | Length |
|---|---|---|
| 1. | "Jack" (Calibre Remix) | 6:34 |
| 2. | "Jack" (Jackapella) | 4:41 |
| 3. | "Jack" (Mak & Pasteman Remix) | 5:57 |

12" vinyl
| No. | Title | Length |
|---|---|---|
| 1. | "Jack" | 5:13 |
| 2. | "Let's Get Hot" | 5:44 |

== In popular culture ==
- The song was featured in the episode "Episode Eight" of the 2015 series You, Me and the Apocalypse.
- The song was adapted by Birmingham City supporters in honour muscular English striker Lee Novak as: I want your body // Everybody wants your body // Lee Novak // Lee Novak.

== Chart performance ==
| Chart (2013) | Peak position |
|---|---|
| Ireland (IRMA) | 74 |
| Scotland Singles (OCC) | 12 |
| UK Dance (OCC) | 4 |
| UK Singles (OCC) | 9 |

=== Year-end charts ===
| Chart (2013) | Position |
|---|---|
| UK Singles (Official Charts Company) | 145 |
