= Goin' Crazy (Dizzee Rascal song) =

Single by Dizzee Rascal featuring Robbie Williams

from the album The Fifth
- Released: 16 June 2013
- Recorded: 2012
- Genre: Grime; dance-pop
- Length: 3:23
- Label: Dirtee Stank; Island
- Songwriter(s): Dylan Mills; Tim Anderson; Jamin Wilcox
- Producer(s): Tim Anderson; J-Man; Nick Cage

Dizzee Rascal singles chronology
"Wild" (2013)	"Goin' Crazy" (2013)	"Something Really Bad" (2013)

Robbie Williams singles chronology
"Be a Boy" (2013)	"Goin' Crazy" (2013)	"Go Gentle" (2013)

Music video
- "Goin' Crazy" ft. Robbie Williams on YouTube

"Goin' Crazy" is a song by Dizzee Rascal, featuring vocals from English singer-songwriter Robbie Williams. The song was written and produced by Tim Anderson and Jamin "J-Man" Wilcox, with additional production by Nick Cage, and co-written by Dizzee Rascal. The song was released on 16 June 2013 as a digital download in the United Kingdom as the lead single from his fifth studio album The Fifth (2013). Dizzee originally had producers Jamin Wilcox and Tim Anderson singing the chorus but the label wanted Robbie Williams as a better business option due to his notoriety. Wilcox however did sing on the song "Life keeps moving on.

== Live performances ==
On 24 May 2013, Dizzee Rascal surprised fans at Radio 1's Big Weekend in Ebrington Square, Derry, County Londonderry, Northern Ireland, by performing the song live with a special guest performance from Robbie Williams.

== Critical reception ==
Robert Copsey of Digital Spy gave the song a mixed review stating:

"In short, the answer is an unfortunate yes. That's not to say the pair themselves aren't surprisingly well-matched – each craving the other's self-assurance and youthful charm – but musically, the effect is far less harmonious. While Rascal raps about dating models and scoring drugs in clubs, Williams admits: "I believe I'm going crazy/ I believe I'm losing my mind," the result a Frankensteinian blend of indie, grime and pop that never quite hits the spot.".

== Track listings ==
Digital download
No.	Title	Length
1.	"Goin' Crazy" (feat. Robbie Williams)	3:23

German CD single
No.	Title	Length
1.	"Goin' Crazy" (feat. Robbie Williams)	3:23
2.	"Goin' Crazy" (Instrumental)	3:23

== Credits and personnel ==
- Vocals – Dizzee Rascal, Robbie Williams
- Lyrics – Dylan Mills, Robbie Williams, Tim Anderson, Jamin Wilcox
- Producer – @Oakwud, Ronald "Flippa" Colson @Flippa123, @PopWansel
- Label: Dirtee Stank, Island Records

== Chart performance ==
=== Weekly charts ===
Chart (2013)	Peak position
Austria (Ö3 Austria Top 40)	57
Belgium (Ultratip Bubbling Under Flanders)	39
Belgium (Ultratip Bubbling Under Wallonia)	38
Denmark (Tracklisten)	35
Germany (GfK)	32
Hungary (Rádiós Top 40)	9
Ireland (IRMA)	25
Scotland (OCC)	4
UK Singles (OCC)	5
UK Airplay (Music Week)	14

=== Year-end charts ===
Chart (2013)	Position
Hungarian Airplay Chart	56
UK Singles (Official Charts Company)	130

== Release history ==
Region	Date	Format	Label
Germany	14 June 2013	CD single	Island Records
United Kingdom	16 June 2013	Digital download	Dirtee Stank, Island Records
