= Everything You Never Had (We Had It All) =

Single by Breach featuring Andreya Triana
- Released: 18 November 2013
- Length: 3:45
- Label: Atlantic; Warner UK
- Songwriter(s): Andreya Triana; Dee Adam; Ben Collier
- Producer(s): Breach

Breach singles chronology
"Jack" (2013)	"Everything You Never Had (We Had It All)" (2013)

Andreya Triana singles chronology
"Song for a Friend" (2013)	"Everything You Never Had (We Had It All)" (2013)

"Everything You Never Had (We Had It All)" is a song by British producer Breach. It features vocals from Andreya Triana. It was released on 18 November 2013, through Atlantic Records. It entered the UK Singles Chart at number nine and the UK Dance Chart at number two on 1 December 2013. The song samples portions of "Think (About It)" by Lyn Collins.

== Music video ==
A music video to accompany the release of "Everything You Never Had (We Had It All)" was first released onto YouTube on 9 October 2013 at a total length of three minutes and thirty seconds. In the video, a woman (professional model/dancer Jo White) walks into a club and starts dancing among the crowd, but in a daydream sequence she imagines herself letting her mind, body and soul go, first by multiplying three times with less clothing, then four more times with the skin, skeletons, and organs becoming visible, and finally appearing as an angel with halo as they all dance in sequence at the same time. When the song ends, the woman returns to reality, dancing among the clubgoers on the floor.

As of December 13, 2021, it has over 11 million views.

== Track listing ==
Digital download - single
No.	Title	Length
1.	"Everything You Never Had (We Had It All)"	2:54

Digital download - EP
No.	Title	Length
1.	"Everything You Never Had (We Had It All)" (Joe Goddard Remix)	5:34
2.	"Everything You Never Had (We Had It All)" (DJ Die's Back To '97 Remix)	5:37
3.	"Everything You Never Had (We Had It All)" (Extended Mix)	7:23

== Chart performance ==
Chart (2013)	Peak position
Scotland (OCC)	13
UK Dance (OCC)	2
UK Singles (OCC)	9

=== Certifications ===
Region	Certification	Certified units/sales
United Kingdom (BPI)	Silver	200,000^{‡}
^{‡} Sales+streaming figures based on certification alone.
