= Ash Gray =

English singer (born 1998)

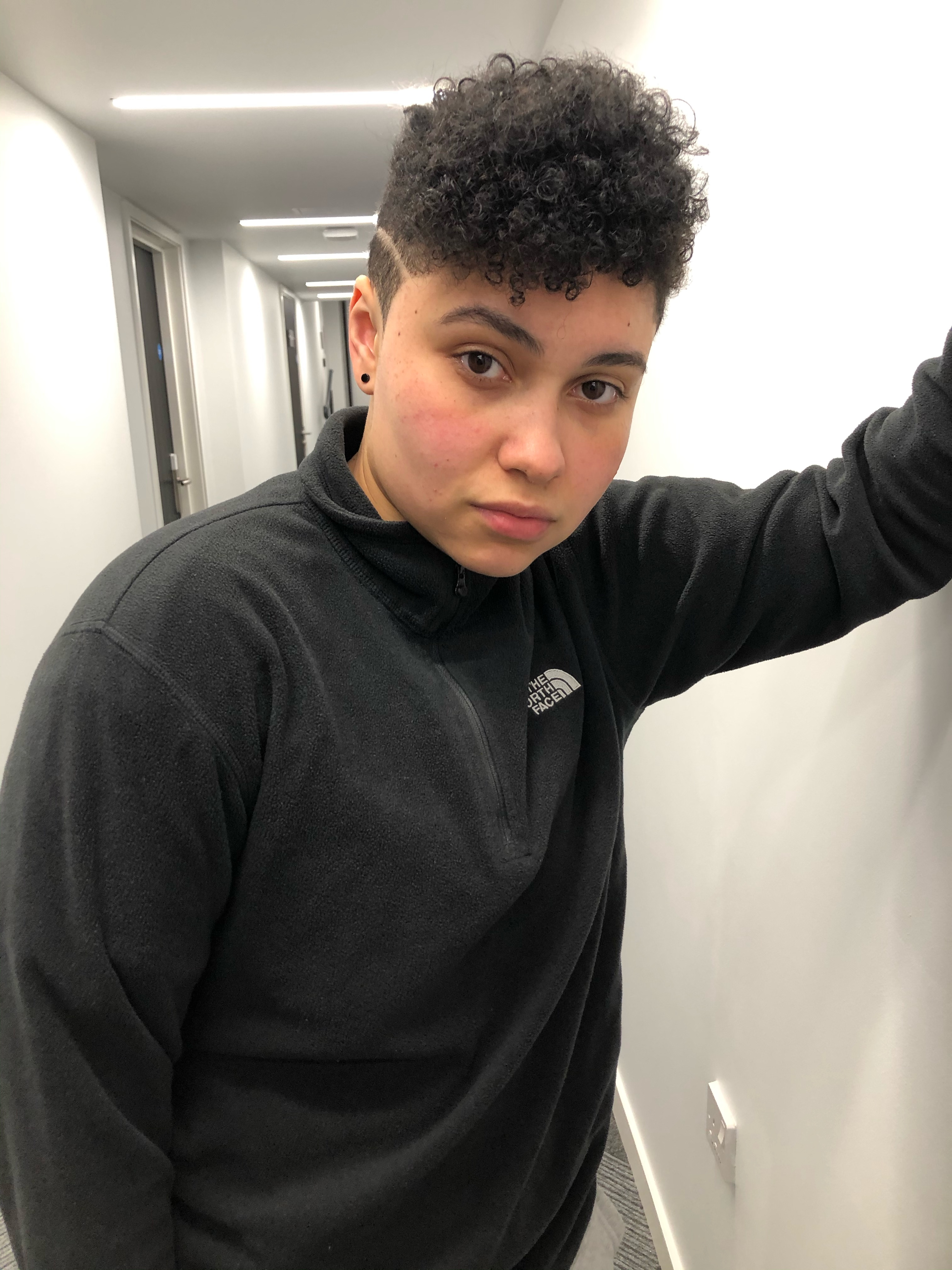
- Ash Gray in 2020

Background information
- Born: 11 December 1998 (age 26); Stevenage, Hertfordshire, England
- Genres: Pop
- Occupation: Singer
- Instruments: Vocals; piano
- Years active: 2013–present
- Labels: Sony; Syco

Ash Gray (born 11 December 1998), sometimes known professionally as Gabz, is an English singer who reached the final of the seventh series of Britain's Got Talent in 2013. Gray released his debut single "Lighters (The One)" under the Gabz name on 30 June 2013, which peaked at number six on the UK Singles Chart.

== Career ==
=== 2013: Britain's Got Talent ===
In his Britain's Got Talent audition, screened on 26 May, Gray who at that time was going by the name Gabz, performed an original song called "The One". When asked beforehand what the song was about, Gray stated that it was about "losing the love of your life". Gray received praise from the judges, with Simon Cowell stating, "I absolutely loved that. I really did. I think that's a cute little song, great chorus, you know, produced properly that song... you may have something there." Gray received four "yes" votes from the judges and was put through to the next round, and subsequently the semi-finals. In the semi-final on 28 May, Gray performed the song again, this time with a backing track and choir. Walliams urged Cowell to make the song available for purchase, predicting it could make number one in the UK Singles Chart. Gray landed in the top three of the night, and with comedian Jack Carroll already through, it was down to the judges to choose between Gardiner and Irish singers Jack and Cormac. All four judges voted for Gray, thus sending him through to the final.

It was Gray's idea to audition, and that his father almost refused to let him audition because of his bad attitude at home, and required Gray to get better, and eventually let him after the deadline was extended. Gray also stated that "It would be amazing to win – I'm not expecting it – I don't think I will. I'm really really happy to get this far, I can't believe it, it's great, I'm just hoping I can get a record deal or something so I can show more of my songs – I've written over 30 now." Gray's hometown also saw support, with banners supplied by businesses around his hometown.

In the final, Gray performed a mash-up of a new song "Lie There" and "The One". Gray finished in seventh place with 3.6% of the vote.

=== 2016 – UP Album & Losing New Sleep Single ===
Cowell stated his intention to give Gray a record deal after Britain's Got Talent. Gray released "The One", renamed "Lighters", on 30 June 2013 via Sony Music.

It was produced by Graham Stack.

The single debuted at number 6 in the UK Singles Chart.

Gray's second single, "Lie There", was released on 3 November 2013. The video was released on 21 October.

A third single "Change the Game" was released on 21 March 2014. Gray's fourth single, "Holiday in Brazil", was released ahead of the 2014 FIFA World Cup in Brazil. It was written by Gray and Paul Baker, with 25 p from every download going to the Make-A-Wish Foundation UK. The video was filmed in London, featuring several of Gray's brothers, two of his cousins and several of his school friends.

In 2016, Gray released his EP titled "Up" which featured five tracks - "Up", "Best Night", "Counting Scars", "Dream Big" and "Friend Zone".

The First Single came from the UP Album was Called Up in July 2016.

Then The Second Single Called Counting Scars came out in August 2016, a Month later after Up the Single Up Came out.

In 2018, The Single "Losing No Sleep" was released in 2018. The music video was subsequently posted on 3 February 2018 to the "GabzOfficialVEVO" YouTube channel. The song and music video is about a couple going through a hard time and how they are struggling to resolve their relationship.

=== 2019: present: Singles ===
On 12 April 2019, Gray released the single 'When I Look At You' and the accompanying music video was posted on 3 May 2019.

In 2020, Gray released his EP "Self Destruct". It featured five tracks - "Crash", "Peak (Interlude)", "Self Destruct", "No Consequences" and "Break up Song".

On 11 June 2021, Gray independently produced and released a remake of his 2013 single "Lighters". This reflected his sexuality as the lyric previously used the term "girlfriend" when referring to a partner he lost and now said "boyfriend".

=== Other media ===
From 2018 to 2019, Gray appeared in the BBC talent series All Together Now, as one of the hundred judges.

== Personal life ==
Gray lives in Stevenage and attended The Nobel School. Gray is a trans man, and uses he/him pronouns.

While Gray still uses the name Gabz on his Spotify and some other social media, his Instagram, Facebook and Twitter use Ash Gray, the name he has used since coming out as transgender, with him tweeting on the name change that while he lost his verification as a result of it, by finally changing his username he is happy.

== Discography ==
=== Extended plays ===
Title	Details
Up	Released: 2 September 2016; Label: Astonishing Records; Format: Digital Download

=== Singles ===
Song	Year	Peak chart positions			Album
Song	Year	UK	IRE	SCO	Album
"Lighters (The One)"	2013	6	10	7	—
"Lie There"	2013	–	–	–	—
"Change the Game"	2014	–	–	–	—
"Holiday in Brazil"	2014	–	–	–	—
"Up"	2016	–	–	–	UP
"Counting Scars"	2016	–	–	–	UP
"Losing No Sleep"	2018	—	—	—	TBA
"When I Look At You"	2019	—	—	—	TBA

=== Music videos ===
List of music videos, with director(s)
Title	Year	Director(s)
"Lighters (The One)"	2013	Greg Francis
"Lie There"	2013	Greg Francis
"Change The Game"	2014	Martin Family
"Holiday In Brazil"	2014	
"Up"	2016	Infinite Film
"Counting Scars"	2016	Infinite Film
"Losing No Sleep"	2018	Chris Booker
"When I Look At You"	2019	
