= So Good to Me =

2013 single by Chris Malinchak

Single by Chris Malinchak
- Released: May 3, 2013
- Genre: House, deep house, R&B
- Length: 5:09
- Label: Ministry of Sound
- Songwriter(s): Chris Malinchak, Marvin Gaye
- Producer(s): Chris Malinchak

Chris Malinchak singles chronology
"There I Was" (2013)	"So Good to Me" (2013)	"If U Got It" (2013)

"So Good to Me" is a song by American DJ and record producer Chris Malinchak. It was released in the United Kingdom on 5 May 2013 by Ministry of Sound. The song samples "If This World Were Mine" (1967) by Marvin Gaye & Tammi Terrell.

"So Good to Me" debuted and peaked at number two in the United Kingdom, failing to prevent "Get Lucky" by Daft Punk featuring Pharrell Williams from spending a third week at the top of the UK Singles Chart. It also peaked at number four in Belgium and the Republic of Ireland and number seven in the Netherlands.

== Background ==
Malinchak told NPR's Metropolis that, living in New York City, he had easy access to old vinyl records, one of which was "If This World Were Mine". He looked in his basement for a vocal sample to use for his track and did not initially realise what was inside the sleeve, which just said, "Motown Accas". After listening to "If This World Were Mine", he felt that the lyrics "said something beautiful".

== Critical reception ==
Lewis Corner of Digital Spy gave the song a positive review, stating: "The result is a masterclass in restrained euphoria, proving that when it comes to Chris Malinchak, less really is more.."

== Music video ==
A music video to accompany the release of "So Good to Me" was first released to YouTube on March 22, 2013 at a total length of two minutes and forty-three seconds. It features a little girl who is trying to find her pet. The pet turns out to be a giraffe (called Stanley), who shows up near the end of the video.

== Track listing ==
Digital download
No.	Title	Length
1.	"So Good To Me" (Radio Edit)	2:38
2.	"So Good To Me" (Extended Mix)	5:09
3.	"So Good To Me" (Zinc Remix)	5:24
4.	"So Good To Me" (MK Remix)	7:35
5.	"So Good To Me" (S. P. Y Remix)	6:28

== Charts and certifications ==
=== Weekly charts ===
Chart (2013)	Peak position
Belgium (Ultratop 50 Flanders)	12
Belgium (Ultratop 50 Wallonia)	40
Germany (GfK)	65
Hungary (Dance Top 40)	17
Hungary (Rádiós Top 40)	13
Ireland (IRMA)	4
Italy (FIMI)	17
Netherlands (Dutch Top 40)	7
Netherlands (Single Top 100)	6
Scotland (OCC)	4
Slovakia (Rádio Top 100)	96
Switzerland (Schweizer Hitparade)	33
UK Singles (OCC)	2
UK Dance (OCC)	2
UK Indie (OCC)	1

=== Year-end charts ===
Chart (2013)	Position
Belgium (Ultratop Flanders)	54
Hungary (Dance Top 40)	60
Hungary (Rádiós Top 40)	27
Netherlands (Dutch Top 40)	54
Netherlands (Single Top 100)	63
UK Singles (OCC)	51

=== Certifications ===
Region	Certification	Certified units/sales
United Kingdom (BPI)	Platinum	600,000^{‡}
^{‡} Sales+streaming figures based on certification alone.

== Release history ==
Region	Date	Format	Label
Belgium	3 May 2013	Digital download	Sony Music
France	3 May 2013	Digital download	Sony Music
Italy	5 May 2013	Digital download	Ego Music
United Kingdom	5 May 2013	Digital download	Ministry of Sound
Netherlands	8 May 2013	Digital download	Spinnin' Records
Germany	17 May 2013	Digital download	Kontor Records, Ministry of Sound
Sweden	21 June 2013	Digital download	Catchy Tunes
Australia	28 June 2013	Digital download	Etcetc
United States	19 November 2013	Digital download	Ultra Records
United States	3 March 2014	Adult album alternative	Ultra Records
