= On My Way (Charlie Brown song) =

Single by Charlie Brown
- Released: 24 March 2013
- Recorded: 2012
- Genre: R&B
- Length: 3:13
- Label: All Around the World
- Songwriter(s): Jerome Williams, Charlie Brown, Kyle "Logik" Burns
- Producer(s): Mushtaq Omar & Timz Aluo (add. Prod)

Charlie Brown singles chronology
"She Makes Me" (2012)	"On My Way" (2013)	"Floodgates" (2013)

"On My Way" is a song by British singer-songwriter Charlie Brown. The song was released in the United Kingdom on 24 March 2013 as a single digital download. The song peaked at number seven on the UK Singles Chart.

== Music video ==
A music video to accompany the release of "On My Way" was first released onto YouTube on 18 January 2013 at a total length of three minutes and sixteen seconds. The video features Brown depicting his childhood as he grows up listening to a music player appearing to write lyrics in a school book in which at the end of the video he is seen with his friends who listen to the track and seem to approve then receiving a CD with Brown's label on the front and Brown appearing to go on stage at the end.

== Versions of the song ==
The following versions of the song are available for sale as digital downloads:

Digital download
No.	Title	Length
1.	"On My Way" (Radio Edit)	3:15
2.	"On My Way" (MNEK Mix Edit)	3:41
3.	"On My Way" (Mike Delinquent Project Remix)	4:44
4.	"On My Way" (Streets Amplified Mix)	3:21
5.	"On My Way" (Sunwalkerz Soul Mix)	4:21
6.	"On My Way" (Supasound Club Mix)	5:27
7.	"On My Way" (LMC Remix)	5:22

== Chart performance ==
The song entered at number seven on the UK Singles Chart on 31 March 2013 ― for the week ending dated 6 April 2013.

=== Weekly charts ===
Chart (2013)	Peak position
Australia (ARIA)	73
Belgium (Ultratip Bubbling Under Flanders)	8
Czech Republic (Rádio – Top 100)	35
Ireland (IRMA)	75
Scotland (OCC)	10
Slovakia (Rádio Top 100)	26
UK Singles (OCC)	7

=== Year-end charts ===
Chart (2013)	Position
UK Singles Chart	149

== Release history ==
Region	Date	Format	Label
United Kingdom	24 March 2013	Digital download	All Around the World
