= Chris Malinchak =

American DJ

- Birth name: Chris Malinchak
- Born: 24 December 1989 (age 35)
- Origin: Brooklyn, New York City, United States
- Genres: House, deep house
- Occupation(s): Electronic musician, DJ, record producer
- Website: www.chrismalinchak.com

Chris Malinchak is an American electronic musician, DJ and record producer best known for his 2013 debut single "So Good to Me", a hit in the United Kingdom.

== Music career ==
Malinchak has produced several songs since 2012, all of which are available on YouTube. His track "So Good to Me" was released as his debut single on May 12, 2013 with an accompanying music video. This song entered the UK Singles Chart at number two, only beaten by Daft Punk's "Get Lucky" in its third week at the top of the chart. The track sold about 73,000 copies in its debut week and on July 22, 2013 acclaimed silver certification, selling over 200,000 copies in the UK. On August 22, 2013, Malinchak released "So into You", a remix of "Don't Disturb this Groove", a 1987 hit by the System. Malinchak's second single, "If U Got It" was released January 24, 2014 and peaked at number 23 in the UK. His third single titled "Stranger" was released in February 2014.

== Discography ==
=== Albums ===
- Night Work (2021)

=== EP ===
- Weird Kid EP (2018) (Chris Malinchak & Kiesza)
- Wash My Soul EP (2019)
- Photograph EP (2019)

=== Singles ===
Year	Title	Peak chart positions								Album
Year	Title	UK	UK Dance	BEL	GER	IRE	NL	SCO	SWI	Album
2013	"So Good to Me"	2	2	12	65	4	6	4	33	Non-album singles
2014	"If U Got It"	23	7	71	—	—	—	33	—	Non-album singles
2014	"Stranger" (featuring Mikky Ekko)	45	—	56	—	—	—	—	—	Non-album singles
2015	"Dragonfly" (featuring Max Schneider)	—	—	—	—	—	—	—	—	Non-album singles
2018	"Mother" (vs. Kiesza)	—	—	—	—	—	—	—	—	Non-album singles
2018	"Crash"	—	—	—	—	—	—	—	—	Non-album singles
2020	"Somebody"	—	—	—	—	—	—	—	—	Night Work
2020	"When The World Stops Turning"	—	—	—	—	—	—	—	—	Night Work
2020	"Happiness (Eternal Moment Mix)"	—	—	—	—	—	—	—	—	Night Work
2020	"Pick You Up"	—	—	—	—	—	—	—	—	Night Work
2021	"Cellophane"	—	—	—	—	—	—	—	—	Night Work
2021	"The Wah Wah Song"	—	—	—	—	—	—	—	—	Night Work
