= Lighters (The One) =

2013 single by Gray

Single by Ash Gray
- Released: 30 June 2013
- Recorded: 2013, London
- Genre: Pop
- Length: 2:44
- Label: Sony
- Songwriter(s): Ash Gray
- Producer(s): Graham Stack

Ash Gray singles chronology
"Lighters (The One)" (2013)	"Lie There" (2013)

"Lighters (The One)", originally called "The One", is a song by British singer Ash Gray, released as his debut single on 30 June 2013 in the United Kingdom under his previous name "Gabz". Gray wrote the song and was produced by Graham Stack. The song entered at number six on the UK Singles Chart.

== Background ==
Gray, aged 14 at the time, premiered the self-written song at his audition for the 2013 series of Britain's Got Talent, in front of judges Simon Cowell, Amanda Holden, Alesha Dixon and David Walliams. He explained that the song is about heartbreak, but as he had not experienced it personally, he took inspiration from films. Gray performed the song at a piano, and it was praised by Cowell who said, "I think that's a cute little song, great chorus, you know, produced properly, that song, you may have something there." Gray performed the song again during the live semi-finals, this time with a backing track and choir. Walliams urged Cowell to make the song available for purchase, predicting it could make number one in the UK Singles Chart. In the live final, Gray performed a medley of "Lighters (The One)" with another self-written song, "Lie There". Each verse contains a rap.

On 19 June 2013, it was announced that "The One", now renamed to "Lighters (The One)", would be released as a single on 30 June, on the Sony record label. He recorded it in London and it was produced by Graham Stack. Gray said, "I'm really excited about my single being released, I'm so happy, it's a dream come true!" It was reported that the rush release of the single was due to "exceptional demand".

== Music video ==
The music video for "Lighters (The One)" was released on 27 June 2013. It was directed by Greg Francis, who explained that the video focuses on Gray and shows the feelings of first love and heartbreak. He said he was trying to make the video look "cool" and "arty", with an "edge to it". Gray kept his own style for the video, wearing a variety of onesies, trainers and caps with clashing colours.

== Track listing ==
Digital download
No.	Title	Length
1.	"Lighters (The One)"	2:44

== Chart performance ==
=== Weekly charts ===
Chart (2013)	Peak position
Ireland (IRMA)	10
Scotland (OCC)	7
UK Singles (OCC)	6

=== Year-end charts ===
Chart (2013)	Peak position
UK Singles (Official Charts Company)	192

== Release history ==
Country	Release date	Format	Label
United Kingdom	30 June 2013	Digital download	Sony Music Entertainment
