= Daniel Pearce (singer) =

English singer and songwriter (born 1978)

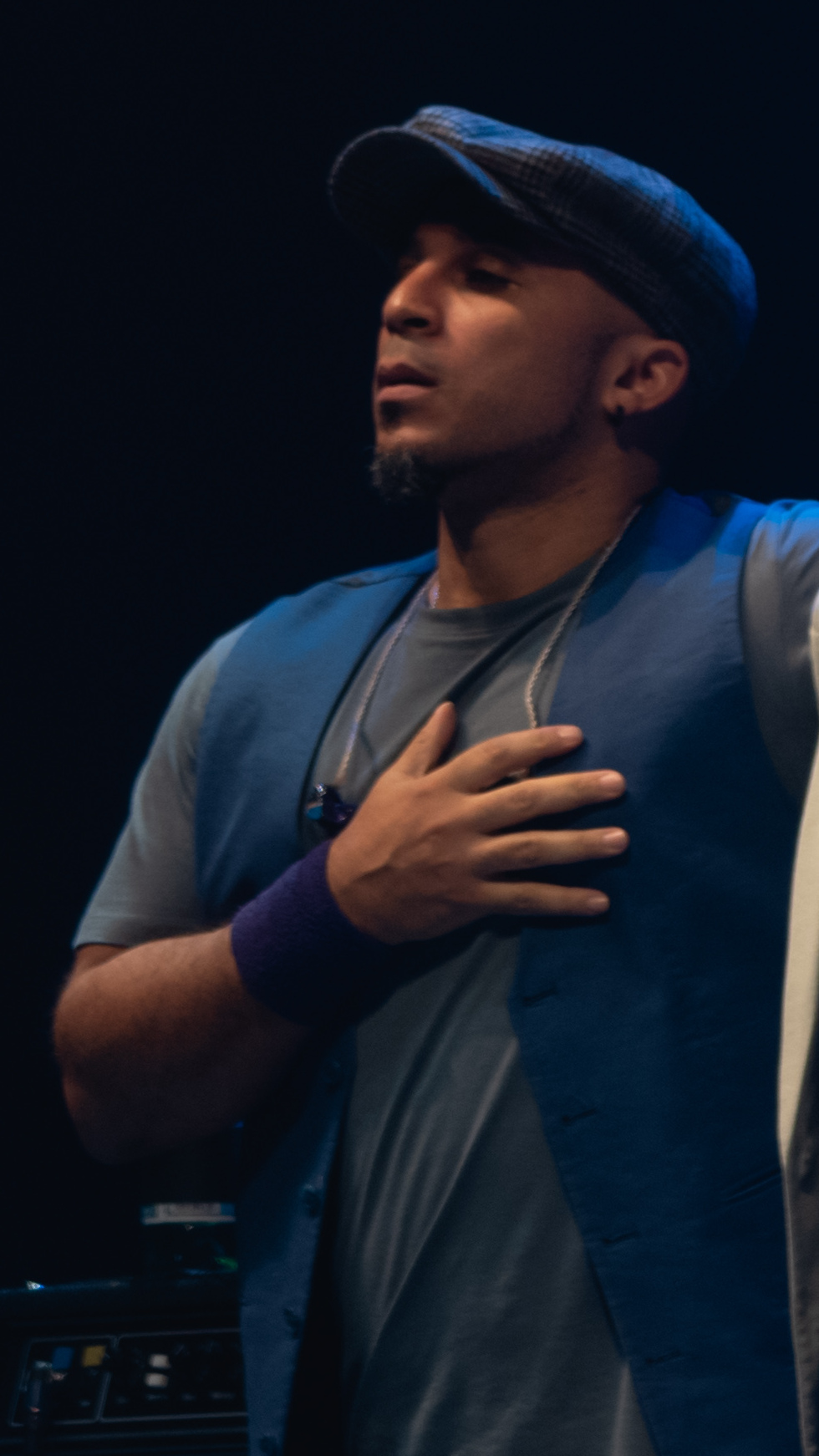
- Pearce with Genesis in 2022

Background information
- Born: Daniel Pearce; 29 May 1978 (age 48)
- Origin: Ashford, Kent, England
- Genres: Pop; hip hop; drum and bass
- Occupations: Singer; songwriter; actor
- Instrument: Vocals
- Years active: 2002–present

Daniel Pearce (born 29 May 1978) is an English singer, songwriter and actor who was a finalist on the ITV reality TV show Popstars: The Rivals. He won a place in the British boy band One True Voice, who subsequently released two top ten singles, "Sacred Trust"/"After You're Gone" and "Shakespeare's (Way With) Words". Pearce, an arranger and co-writer of some of their songs, left the group in summer 2003, shortly before the band split up. In September 2009, he auditioned for the 2009 series of The X Factor, but failed to progress as far as the live finals.

In 2010, he returned as backing vocalist on a hit entitled "Dirtee Disco", a UK No. 1 single by Dizzee Rascal, featuring Pearce. Since 2011, he has provided vocals and percussion for the English funk band Shuffler. In 2014, Pearce provided lead vocals for "Nobody to Love", the UK number-one single from DJs Sigma.

== Career ==
=== 2002: Popstars: The Rivals ===
In 2002, Pearce took part in Popstars: The Rivals.

- Week 1, he sang "Against All Odds". He progressed.
- Week 3, he sang "Celebration". He progressed.
- Week 5, he sang "For Once in My Life". He progressed.
- Week 7, in the boys' final, he sang "Candle in the Wind".

Host Davina McCall announced the names of the five contestants who had qualified. Keith Semple was the first member to be announced followed by Matt Johnson. Third was Pearce and fourth Anton Gordon. The last available place went to Jamie Shaw whereas Chris Park was eliminated from the boys competition. Pearce and the four other contestant winners (Anton Gordon, Matthew Johnson, Keith Semple and Jamie Shaw) went on to form the group One True Voice. The show also produced the girl group Girls Aloud.

=== 2002–03: One True Voice ===
Pearce became a member of One True Voice, a British boy band created on the ITV television series Popstars: The Rivals. The band was created by the public, who voted for their favourite hopefuls each week. The group, whose name was later shortened to OTV, was made up of Pearce, Anton Gordon, Matt Johnson, Keith Semple and Jamie Shaw.

Their debut single, Sacred Trust/After You're Gone, went head-to-head with Girls Aloud on 16 December 2002, for the Christmas number one spot. One True Voice lost out to the girls and had to settle for the number 2 position. One more Top 10 hit followed, in the form of Shakespeare's (Way With) Words, which reached number 10 in the UK, in June 2003. A few weeks later, it was announced that Daniel Pearce, who as arranger and co-writer of some of their songs had quit the group to pursue a solo career. The next day the group disbanded. The group also appeared at number 32 in Chantelle's Top 50 Reality TV Stars, ahead of both Phixx and Clea who also appeared in Popstars: The Rivals.

He appeared briefly in several roles mainly playing himself as member of One True Voice in TV Burp, Kelly, V Graham Norton (all in 2002) and Smile, Loose Women, Lose Lips (in 2003) and in Hell's Kitchen and The Weakest Link.

=== 2003–09: Post-split ===
After the split-up of the band, Pearce appeared as the lead in Jailhouse Rock, the West End musical in London, and provided back-up vocals for Craig David. He continued to perform as a gigging musician and singer.

=== 2009: The X Factor ===
Pearce auditioned for the 2009 series of The X Factor, where he made it through the first round of auditions to the bootcamp stage. In the audition, he sang Seal's "Kiss from a Rose" and Prince's "Purple Rain" at the boot camp. He was selected one of the final 24 acts, in the "Over 25s" category, mentored by Simon Cowell. He sang George Michael's "Praying for Time", at the "judges' house" phase but he was not selected for the live finals.

Another former One True Voice band member, Keith Semple, attempted a similar comeback in 2010 on the ninth season of the American Idol. He was given a "golden ticket" to Hollywood but was disqualified because of his residency status in the United States.

=== Collaborations ===
Pearce sang with Dizzee Rascal on the 2009 Christmas and New Year editions of Top of the Pops, singing Rascal's song "Holiday". He also appeared with Dizzee Rascal on Later...with Jools Holland on 31 December 2009 as one of the back-up singers singing "Holiday". More recently he has been seen as a backing singer for Dizzee Rascal singing on the hit "Dance wiv Me". Pearce also co-wrote and collaborated with Rascal on his last UK number 1 with the single "Dirtee Disco". He appeared with Dizzee on 30 April 2010 on Friday Night with Jonathan Ross singing backing vocals and playing the drums on the song. He also performed "Dance wiv Me" with Rascal at Reading and Leeds Festival 2010.

In May and June 2013, Pearce sang with Rascal as support on Muse's UK dates for their Unsustainable Tour. In June 2013, Daniel again supported Rascal, on the Pyramid Stage at Glastonbury. In January 2014, British drum and bass duo Sigma released a bootleg remix of "Bound 2" by Kanye West and Charlie Wilson as a free download. After the song received radio support from major radio stations, it was reworked into an original track, with Pearce covering Wilson's vocals. The song reached number one on the UK Singles Chart, though Pearce was uncredited on the single cover. Pearce performed the song with Sigma at the Capital Jingle Bell Ball. He has toured with the drum & bass duo ever since. Pearce is one of the UK's most successful hit vocalists with numerous contributions to hit chart and club tracks in recent years. This includes including three number 1's, with one being a Brit and another being a Grammy nomination.

=== 2021: Genesis tour ===
In September 2021, Pearce joined Genesis' The Last Domino? Tour as backing vocalist. Lead singer Phil Collins had suffered with declining health for years and was supported by backing vocalists for the first time in the band's career.

=== Shuffler ===
In 2011, Pearce co-founded the funk, rock and soul band Shuffler alongside three members of British jazz funk music band Jamiroquai, bassist Paul Turner, guitarist and songwriter Rob Harris and drummer Derrick McKenzie. Pearce is the lead vocalist of the band, who play both original material and covers and completed a debut self-titled album Shuffler in 2013. The album has yet to be officially released.

== Personal life ==
Pearce was born in Kent, England to an English mother and Nigerian father. He was married in 2004 to fellow singer Charlotte Hodson and they had two sons. After 12 years of marriage, they divorced in 2016. Pearce was adopted as a baby. His late biological mother, Maryanne Morgan, was a songwriter who penned songs for groups such as Sugababes.

== Discography ==
=== Albums ===
With Shuffler

- 2013: Shuffler

=== Singles ===
With One True Voice

- 2002: "Sacred Trust / After You're Gone" - UK #2
- 2003: "Shakespeare's (Way with) Words" - UK #10

==== As solo singer ====
Title	Year	Album	Lead vocals	Backing vocals
"Oh My Gosh"	2005	Basement Jaxx – The Singles		check
"U Don't Know Me"	2005	Basement Jaxx – The Singles		check
"Dirtee Disco"	2010	Dizzee Rascal – Tongue n' Cheek		check
"Infinity 2012"	2012	Guru Josh – "Infinity 2012" (single)	check	check
"Yeah Yeah"	2012	Willy Moon – Here's Willy Moon		check
"Every Day"	2012	Eric Prydz – "Opus"	check	check
"Searching"	2013	Kove – "Searching" (single)	check	check
"Right Here" (featuring Foxes)	2013	Rudimental – Home		check
"So Good to Me"	2013	Chris Malinchak – "So Good to Me" (single)	check	
"Nobody to Love"	2014	Sigma – Life	check	
"Close"	2014	Sub Focus – Torus	check	check
"I Got U"	2014	Duke Dumont – EP1		check
"Make Me Feel Better"	2015	Alex Adair – "Make Me Feel Better" (single)		check
"Sometimes I Feel So Deserted"	2015	The Chemical Brothers – Born in the Echoes	check	
"Let Me Be Your Fantasy"	2022	MODE12 – "Let Me Be Your Fantasy" (single)	check	
