= Shuffler =

English funk band

- Origin: London, England
- Genres: Funk; rock; soul
- Years active: 2011–present
- Members: Daniel Pearce; Paul Turner; Derrick McKenzie; Rob Harris

Shuffler are an English funk band formed in London in 2011 with a debut concert at the Jazz Café. The collective recorded their self-titled debut studio album, Shuffler in 2013. It has yet to be officially released although some promotional copies were distributed. The band is made up of Daniel Pearce on lead vocals and percussions, Paul Turner on bass, Rob Harris on guitar and Derrick McKenzie on drums. It has following in both United Kingdom and Europe.

The members of the band, that play original materials as well as stylized covers, have experience playing music.

Daniel Pearce was in Popstars: The Rivals in 2002 and part of the boy band that resulted from the show called One True Voice. In 2009, he auditioned for the 2009 series of The X Factor, but failed to progress as far as the live finals. He collaborated with British rapper Dizzee Rascal to co-write and sing on Dizzee's last UK number 1 hit "Dirtee Disco". He was also the hit vocalist on the drum n bass duo Sigma's platinum selling number 1 smash hit in 2014. To date, Pearce has been the hit vocalist on more than a dozen chart and club hits since 2010.

The other three have known each other through their work in the British funk and acid jazz band Jamiroquai. Paul Turner was a bassist with them before joining Shuffler. He was also involved in the eclectic progressive rock trio The Dark Sinatras. Derrick McKenzie and Rob Harris were drummer and guitarist in Jamoroquai. Harris is also a songwriter and record producer. During 2007–08, he co-wrote and co-produced the debut studio album, Stitch Me Up for Universal Music Group artist Julian Perretta with success in France and Germany.

== Discography ==
=== Albums ===
- 2013: Shuffler [unreleased]
