= Hold on Me (Phixx song) =

2003 single by Phixx

Single by Phixx

from the album Electrophonic Revolution
- Released: 27 October 2003
- Length: 4:04
- Label: Concept Music
- Songwriters: John McLaughlin; Dave James; Nikk Mager; Peter Smith; Chris Park; Andrew Kinlochan; Mikey Green
- Producers: Dave James; John McLaughlin

Phixx singles chronology
"Hold on Me" (2003)	"Love Revolution" (2004)

"Hold on Me" is a song by British pop group Phixx, released on 27 October 2003 in the United Kingdom. It was their debut release via Concept Music and the lead single taken from the band's debut album, "Electrophonic Revolution". A music video was for "Hold on Me" was released and features the band shirtless and performing dance routines. The band performed the single on Top of the Pops, complete with sexualised dance routines. The performance caused controversy with viewers and Ofcom ruled it was unsuitable for broadcast in the evening timeslot for its depictions of bondage. The single debuted and peaked at number ten on the UK Singles Chart and remained on the chart for four weeks.

== Background ==
"Hold on Me" is the debut single from the boyband Phixx, who were formed from the male finalists who were voted off the series, Popstars: The Rivals. They all signed a contract with Concept Music label in London. Band member Nikk Mager described the group's musical sound as being an 80s style offering, similar to music released by the groups Duran Duran and Depeche Mode. The song was announced in early September 2003, alongside its release date. "Hold on Me" was released in the United Kingdom on 27 October 2003. The song was featured on the compilation release "Now That's What I Call Music! 56".

== Critical reception ==
Sunderland Echo's Wil Marlow described "Hold on Me" as a "80s-tinged debut single". Simon Sadler from Music Week praised the song, writing "The Phixx track surprised us at how good it is. One True Voice must are kicking themselves." Shelley Dyer from Halifax Evening Courier branded the song "as dire as One True Voice's offerings". Dyer praised a remixed version by Roger Taylor, titled "Roger Taylor's Orgasmatron-ixx mix" for its "hard edged 80s blend of diverse sounds". Liz Ellis from West Lancashire Evening Gazette echoed Dyer's sentiment, calling it "as poor as One True Voice's offerings" and also praised the Taylor remix.

== Chart performance ==
"Hold on Me" debuted at number ten on the UK Singles Chart for the week ending 8 November 2003. It remained in the top one hundred for four weeks until the week ending 28 November 2003, which it placed at fifty-three before dropping out of the chart. It debuted at number two on the UK Indie Chart for the week ending 8 November 2003 and remained for seven weeks until 20 December 2003. It peaked at number eight on the Scottish Singles Chart dated also dated 8 November 2003.

== Music video ==
A music video for "Hold on Me" was released and featured the band performing a strip routine. All band members agreed to perform in the video without their shirts because they wanted to differentiate themselves from the usual "bland boy-band fare". The video began gaining popularity during October 2003. It rose to twenty-one on the television airplay charts after music channels began playing it more frequently.

== Live performances ==
To promote the single, Phixx performed it on the BBC music show Top of the Pops during the 7 November 2003 episode. It featured them doing a similar strip routine as featured in the song's music video. Mager described the routine featured on stage as a "risky performance" with a "few surprises". The performance caused controversy because of the sexualised dance routines the band performed, with a writer from Sunday World calling it a "bondage appearance". Eight viewers complained to the broadcasting regulatory authority, Ofcom. They complained that the dancing was unsuitable for children. In February 2004, Ofcom's investigation deemed the performance unsuitable for broadcast in its timeslot because of younger viewers. They criticised the BBC for allowing it to air and likened it to something better suited to a "bondage show". They noted that Phixx's dance routines contained choreographed hitting, hair pulling and strangulation. In the segment, the members had chains wrapped around their necks and torsos. The BBC responded by accepting that the performance could lead viewers to believe such forms of restraint were toys. On 1 November 2003, the band performed "Hold on Me" on Channel 4's music show Popworld. In August 2004, the band performed the song during a concert at the McAlpine Stadium in Huddersfield.

== Track listings ==
UK CD1

1. "Hold on Me" (radio edit) – 4:04
2. "Hold on Me" (EuropaXL Vocal Mixx) – 6:30
3. "Creepin"
4. "Hold on Me" (video)

UK CD2

1. "Hold on Me" (radio edit) – 4:04
2. "Eyes Wide Open"
3. "Hold on Me" (Happy Rocker extended mix)

== Charts ==
Chart (2003)	Peak position
Scottish Singles Sales (Official Charts)	8
UK Singles (Official Charts)	10
UK Indie (Official Charts)	2
