= Electrophonic Revolution =

Studio album by Phixx
- Released: 1 November 2004
- Recorded: 2003–2004
- Genre: Pop
- Length: 53.01
- Label: Concept

Singles from Electrophonic Revolution
- 1. "Hold on Me" Released: October 2003; 2. "Love Revolution" Released: March 2004; 3. "Wild Boys" Released: June 2004; 4. "Strange Love" Released: January 2005

Electrophonic Revolution is the debut and only studio album released by English-Irish boy band Phixx, formed from the five runners-up of the ITV reality television series Popstars: The Rivals who failed to make it into the boy band One True Voice. It was released in the United Kingdom on 1 November 2004, but despite the four singles from the album—"Hold on Me", "Love Revolution", "Wild Boys" and "Strange Love"—all making the top 20, the album failed to chart. Just after the release of "Wild Boys", Peter Smith left the group to pursue a solo career and to give him more time to write music.

== Background ==
In February 2003, Phixx signed to Hyperactive Management, who had previously been successful with Liberty X.

The videos and dance routines for their first two singles aroused media attention for their content, as they often featured the band topless or naked, often in sexually suggestive and aggressive situations with other men.

In autumn 2004, Phixx toured South Africa, where they were already popular. There they released Electrophonic Revolution and it became the best-selling album for their South African record company Sheer Music. The band co-wrote some of the songs for the album with Lee Ryan from Blue, Brian McFadden (formerly of Westlife), Alistair Griffin, Ultra, and Theo from Liberty X. All the tracks were produced by John McLaughlin, who had previously worked with Busted.

In December 2004, the band recorded a Christmas song written by Matt Baker for the children's show Blue Peter. This song was available as a free download from the Blue Peter website in the weeks leading up to Christmas, but it was never released for sale.

== Singles ==
- In October 2003, they released their first single, "Hold on Me", on the Concept Records label, which charted at number 10 on the UK Singles Chart, selling over 60,000 copies.
- March 2004 saw the release of their second single "Love Revolution", which sold over 50,000 copies and charted at number 13.
- The third single, released in June 2004, was a cover of Duran Duran's "Wild Boys". During the release week, one version of the single was disqualified from the chart for being a few seconds too long, so the single dropped from the midweek chart position of 9, to number 23; however, an appeal was made to the chart regulators and both versions were eventually counted, giving a final position of number 12. The single sold over 65,000 copies.
- In January 2005, they released their fourth UK single, "Strange Love" (written by Judie Tzuke), which entered the UK Singles Chart at number 19.

== Track list ==
Track	Song	Length
1.	"Hold on Me"	3:45
2.	"Love Revolution"	3:53
3.	"Wild Boys"	3:47
4.	"Strange Love"	4:07
5.	"Original Sin"	4:03
6.	"Superstar"	3:44
7.	"Judgement Day"	4:15
8.	"Red Light"	2:48
9.	"Relentless"	3:39
10.	"Voyeur"	3:42
11.	"Temptation"	3.39
12.	"Let's Go All the Way" (Sly Fox cover)	3.26
13.	"City of Night"	3:43
14.	"When I Fall"	4:30
15.	"Don't Walk Out"	4:00

== Release history ==
Country	Date	Format	Label
United Kingdom	1 January 2004	CD	Concept Records
