= Keith Semple =

Northern Irish singer and musician (born 1981)

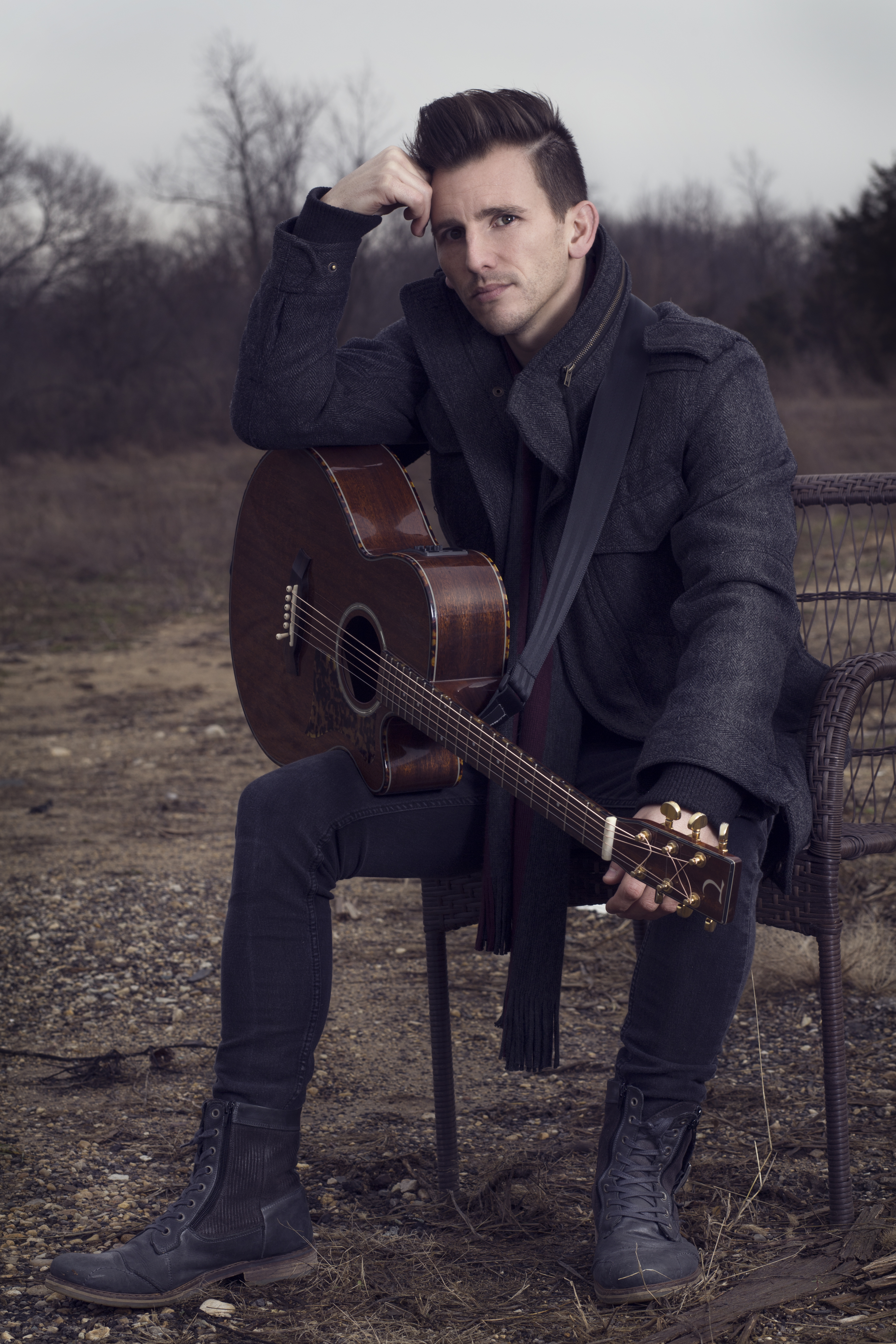
- Semple in 2015

Background information
- Born: 20 September 1981 (age 44); Larne, Northern Ireland United Kingdom
- Genres: Pop, rock, Progressive rock
- Occupations: Musician, singer, songwriter
- Instruments: Vocals, guitar, keyboard
- Years active: 2001–present
- Member of: SEMPLE; The Cyberiam
- Formerly of: One True Voice; Keith Semple Band; Alibi; 7th Heaven; Adam Levine; Manny Cabo; Dustin Christensen; Jordan Smith
- Website: keithsemple.net thecyberiam.com

Keith Semple (born 20 September 1981) is a British singer and musician from Larne, Northern Ireland. He originally had his own band Keith Semple Band. In 2002, he took part and was a winner in Popstars: The Rivals, consequently becoming a member of the boyband One True Voice (OTV). After the split-up of the band, Semple had a solo career before joining the Chicago-based rock band 7th Heaven in 2006 as their lead singer. In 2010, he took a shot at the ninth season of American Idol but lost his "golden ticket" place due to his legal status and residency considerations. In October 2012, Semple announced he would be leaving 7th Heaven to pursue his original music and announced the formation of his new band, SEMPLE. In September 2015, he auditioned for season 9 of The Voice as part of Team Adam. He was eliminated from competition after the top 24 round. In 2016, he formed the progressive rock band, The Cyberiam, where he serves as lead singer and guitarist.

== Career ==
=== 2002: Popstars: The Rivals ===
Semple took part in the ITV television series Popstars: The Rivals, a British singing competition.

- Week 1, he sang "Reach Out I'll Be There" from The Four Tops. He was safe.
- Week 3, he sang "Over My Shoulder" from Mike + The Mechanics. He was safe.
- Week 5, he sang "Sorry Seems to Be the Hardest Word" from Elton John and Bernie Taupin. He was safe.
- Week 7, in the boys' final, he sang "You Are So Beautiful" from Joe Cocker.

Host Davina McCall announced the names of the five contestants who had qualified for the boy band. Semple was the first member to be announced followed by Matt Johnson. Third was Daniel Pearce and fourth Anton Gordon. The last available place went to Jamie Shaw whereas Chris Park was eliminated from the boys competition.

Semple and the four other contestant winners (Anton Gordon, Matthew Johnson, Daniel Pearce and Jamie Shaw) went on to form the group One True Voice.

The same show had also produced the girl group Girls Aloud also won the competition.

=== 2002–2003: One True Voice ===
Semple became a band member of the boyband One True Voice created as a results of the competition. The line up of the band was decided by public vote, who voted for their favourite male hopefuls each week to form the boyband. The name of the band was later shortened to OTV.

One True Voice was made up of:

- Anton Gordon (from London, England)
- Matt Johnson (from Deeside, Wales)
- Daniel Pearce (from Kent, England)
- Keith Semple (from Larne, Northern Ireland)
- Jamie Shaw (from Cardiff, Wales)

Their debut single, a double A side hit single "Sacred Trust/After You're Gone" went head-to-head with Girls Aloud on 16 December 2002, for the Christmas number one spot. One True Voice lost out to the girls and had to settle for the UK Christmas No. 2 position. The group's manager, Pete Waterman, has speculated that the show was fixed against OTV, but has not said how.. In any case, the single "Sacred Trust/After You're Gone" reached gold record status.

One more Top 10 hit followed, in the form of "Shakespeare's (Way with) Words", which reached No. 10 in the UK, in June 2003. A few weeks later it was announced that Daniel Pearce, who as arranger and co-writer of some of their songs had quit the group to pursue a solo career. The next day the group disbanded.

The group appeared at number 32 in Chantelle's Top 50 Reality TV Stars, ahead of both Phixx and Clea who also appeared in Popstars: The Rivals.

=== 2003–2008: Solo career ===
After the split, Semple continued his musical career reforming his pre-OTV band, the Keith Semple Band, then fronted the band Alibi.

=== 2006–2012: 7th Heaven ===
In 2006, Semple moved to the United States and joined Chicago-based rock band 7th Heaven as their lead singer. This resulted in a critically acclaimed album USA-UK alluding to the co-operation of this UK act in an American band.

During Semple's membership, the band consisted of members:

- Keith Semple – guitars, vocals (lead singer), keyboard
- Richard Hofherr – guitars, vocals, keyboard
- Mike Mooshey – drums
- Mark Kennetz – bass, vocals
- Nick Cox – guitar, vocals
- Tamara Mooshey – vocals

With Semple the band released a number of studio and live albums: Medley CD (2007), U.S.A – U.K. (2008), Unplugged (2009), Pop Medley 2 (2009), Medley CD/DVD (2010), Jukebox (2010), Merry Christmas in Chicago (2010) and Pop Media (2011). He left the band in 2012.

In 2012, Semple left the band and was replaced by Anthony Fedorov, a contestant finalist on the fourth season of American Idol.

=== 2010: American Idol ===
In January 2010, Semple successfully auditioned for the ninth season of American Idol. He was put in the intro to the Chicago episode of the American Idol.

Semple said Simon Cowell was reportedly "unhappy" he did not tell his band members 7th Heaven in advance about his audition. But Fox Chicago affiliate offered to film Semple telling his band 7th Heaven and allowed them to perform together on Fox, thus giving him a fresh chance.

At the actual Chicago auditions, he sang the Bryan Adams' song "Heaven". Simon Cowell said "I'm going to pass", but the three other judges Kara DioGuardi, Randy Jackson and guest judge Shania Twain approved him going to the next round on a golden ticket.

But after the broadcast, it was revealed there was an immigration snafu about Semple's residency status, and that he being in the United States on a work visa and not as a permanent resident would disqualify him from applying to American Idol that stipulates that non-Americans applying to the show should at least have a permanent residency status, not a temporary working visa permit. The American Idol producers pulled the plug on Semple continuing with the competition and disqualified him.

Another former One True Voice band member Daniel Pearce had attempted a comeback less than a year earlier in 2009 on the sixth season of the UK The X Factor. Pearce was picked for the Final 24 but failed to make it to the Final 12.

=== 2013–present: SEMPLE and The Cyberiam ===
SEMPLE
- Origin: United States
- Genres: Rock
- Years active: 2013–present
- Members: Keith Semple; Johnny Jannotti; Joshua Patterson; Valentine Bennett
- Past members: Amy Jay; Charley Bredrup; Paulie Felice; Stevie Craig; Drew Johnson

The Cyberiam
- Origin: United States
- Genres: Progressive rock
- Years active: 2016–present
- Members: Keith Semple; Frank Lucas; Tommy Murray; Brian Kovacs

After announcing his resignation as the lead singer of 7th Heaven in October 2012, Semple introduced his new band, SEMPLE. With members Johnny Jannotti (formerly of Chasing the Day), Drew Johnson (formerly of Ordinary Outcasts), Amy Jay (formerly of Cat Fight) and Charley Bredrup (Fletcher Rockwell and The JR Miller Project).

At the end of 2013, Amy announced she would be leaving the band to pursue her post grad education. One year later, the band, functioning as a four-piece, mutually parted ways with Charley Bredrup. Following interim guitarists Paulie Felice (of Lexington, KY) and Stevie Craig, the position was permanently filled by Valentine Bennett (of McHenry, IL).

SEMPLE focuses on the original music Keith Semple has been writing and recording for years, as well as new material the band is working on together.

In 2016, Semple founded the progressive rock band The Cyberiam with keyboardist, Frank Lucas, and Lateralus drummer Tommy Murray. Along with bassist Brian Kovacs, they have released two studio albums, one EP, and two live albums to date. The Cyberiam have played at several progressive rock festivals, Progtoberfest IV in 2018, ProgStock in 2019, Marillion Couch Convention in 2020, and ProgPower USA in 2022 receiving a host of accolades. Keith and Brian toured as The Cyberiam Duo opening for Riverside in 2022.

=== U.S. The Voice ===
In 2015, he auditioned for season 9 of the American series The Voice. In the debut episode of the season broadcast on 21 September 2015, he sang "I'll Be There For You" with two of the four judges, Adam Levine and Gwen Stefani turning their chairs. Semple chose to be part of Team Adam.

Semple was paired against Manny Cabo in the Battle Rounds. They both sang The Who's "Baba O'Riley". Semple was declared the winner of the battle, thus advancing to the knockout rounds, where he was paired against Team Adam's Dustin Christensen, with Semple singing Foreigner's "I Want to Know What Love Is" while Christensen opted the song "Free" from Zac Brown Band, with Adam Levine choosing Semple as winner of the Knockout and moving forward to the Live Shows.

On 9 November 2015, in the first round of live shows broadcast, he sang "To Be with You", but failed to attract the top 2 votes of Team Adam finalists, and failed to be saved by Levine and was eliminated from competition on 11 November 2015.

Stage	Song	Original Artist	Date	Order	Result
Blind Audition	"I'll Be There For You"	Bon Jovi	21 September 2015	1.3	Adam Levine and Gwen Stefani turned Joined Team Adam
Battle Rounds (Top 48)	"Baba O'Riley" (vs. Manny Cabo)	The Who	13 October 2015	8.1	Saved by Coach
The Knockouts (Top 32)	"I Want to Know What Love Is" (vs. Dustin Christensen)	Foreigner	27 October 2015	12.2	Saved by Coach
Live Playoffs (Top 24)	"To Be with You"	Mr. Big	9 November 2015	15.3	Eliminated

Non Competition Performances:

Order	Friend	Song
1.75	Amy Vachal, Chance Peña, Blaine Mitchell, Shelby Brown, Jordan Smith	"Diamonds"

== Discography ==
=== Albums with 7th Heaven ===
- 2007: Medley CD
- 2008: U.S.A – U.K.
- 2009: Unplugged
- 2010: Pop Medley 2 (2009)
- 2010: Medley CD/DVD
- 2010: Jukebox
- 2010: Merry Christmas in Chicago
- 2011: Pop Media

=== Singles with One True Voice ===
- 2002: "Sacred Trust / After You're Gone" , (reached No. 2 in the British Singles Chart)
- 2003: "Shakespeare's (Way with) Words" (reached No. 10 in the British Singles Chart)

=== Albums with SEMPLE ===
- 2013: Not for Radio
- 2013: Live At H.O.M.E.
- 2015: Learn How to Fly
- 2016: Anytime Anywhere
- 2017: For One Night Only
- 2018: 5 O'clock

=== Albums with The Cyberiam ===
- 2018: The Cyberiam
- 2019: The Butterfly Effect
- 2019: Live in the Cyberiam
- 2020: Forging Nations Live!
- 2021: Connected
- 2024: Unobtainium
- 2025: Durty & Live
