= 7th Heaven (band) =

American rock band

- Origin: Chicago, Illinois, U.S.
- Years active: 1985–present
- Label: NTD Records
- Members: Richard Hofherr; Adam Heisler; Mark Kennetz; Nick Cox; Frankie Harchut
- Past members: Tony DiGiulio; Michael Mooshey; Tony Golec; Danny Weymouth; Andrew Blake; Dan Miller; Mark Jones; Matt Clark; Erica Heiden; Stephen Jensen; Alby Odum; Dave Carozzo; Dean Cutenelli; Chris Senior; Keith Semple; Anthony Fedorov

7th Heaven is a Chicago, Illinois-based rock band created by guitarist Richie Hofherr, Tony Di Giulio, and Michael Mooshey. Formed in 1985, it has continued up to present day with changing band members. The band was named by co-founder Michael Mooshey in 1985. The band name 7th Heaven was named after the line "we'll be right in 7th heaven" from the song "Rock Around the Clock" by Bill Haley & His Comets.

== Biography ==
7th Heaven is currently managed by NTD Management and signed to NTD Records. They were previously managed by Alec John Such of Bon Jovi and James Young of Styx in 1997-1998. They have sold 100,000 CDs to date. Their acclaimed Silver 30-tracks double CD released in 2004 was a popular release.

The title of their 2008 release 14-track album USA-UK came from the joining of Northern Ireland singer Keith Semple. Semple was in Popstars: The Rivals, a UK singing competition and became a member of boy band One True Voice during the period 2002-2003, before the group broke up. Semple had a gold record with One True Voice through their double A-side hit "Sacred Trust / After You're Gone" that reached No. 2 on the UK Singles Chart.

7th Heaven released the album Jukebox in 2010, the 25th anniversary of the band. It contains 15 CDs with almost 300 of the band's songs recorded throughout their career. They also recorded another Semple-led album entitled Pop Media in 2011 containing 22 new songs.

In January 2013, Semple left the band and was replaced by Anthony Fedorov as lead singer. In June of that year, they released the album Synergy. On August 22, 2013 the band announced that Fedorov was no longer in the band. After Federov's departure, Semple returned as the band's temporary lead vocalist.

On December 1, 2014, Adam Blair Heisler was announced as the new lead singer. Heisler had also been in bands such as Dot Dot Dot, Adam and the Go Comets, and the Fabulous Janes. Dot Dot Dot was featured on FOX's The Next Great American Band.

Besides performing around 200 shows a year in the Chicago area, 7th Heaven performs on the "Chicago Music Cruise" every January in the Caribbean; as well as Las Vegas every couple years.

== Members ==
=== Current members ===
- Richard Hofherr - guitars, vocals, keyboards (co-founder)
- Adam Heisler - lead vocals, guitar
- Mark Kennetz - bass, vocals
- Nick Cox - guitar, vocals
- Frankie Harchut - drums

=== Former members ===
- Tony DiGiulio (co-founder)
- Michael Mooshey (co-founder)
- Tony Golec
- Danny Weymouth
- Andrew Blake
- Dan Miller
- Mark Jones
- Matt Clark
- Erica Heiden
- Stephen Jensen
- Alby Odum
- Dave Carozzo
- Dean Cutenelli
- Chris Senior
- Keith Semple
- Anthony Fedorov
- Tamara Mooshey
- Tony Davis
- Carl Cichanski
- Dan O'Brien
- Scot Coogan
- James Bluthardt
- Chris Mosher

== Discography ==
=== Studio albums ===
- 1990: The Time Has Come
- 1998: Media Overkill
- 1999: Pop Life
- 2000: Faces Time Replaces
- 2003: Silver
- 2008: U.S.A. - U.K.
- 2011: Pop Media
- 2013: Synergy
- 2014: Spectrum
- 2015: Next
- 2017: Luminous
- 2018: Color in Motion
- 2020: Be Here

=== Live albums ===
- 2005: Live at Durty Nellies (included in the Live at Durty Nellies DVD)

=== Christmas albums ===
- 2004: Christmas CD
- 2012: Merry Christmas in Chicago (includes new songs and different versions of the songs which were also included on Christmas CD)
- 2018: Christmas 2018 (includes new songs and different versions of the songs which were also included on Christmas CD and Merry Christmas in Chicago)

=== Remix albums ===
- 2013: Dance Media (includes dance remixes of some songs of the studio album Pop Media)

=== Cover albums ===
- 2004: Sampler – Vol. 1 (includes the "Rock Medley" and eight cover songs)
- 2007: Medley CD (includes "Pop Medley 1" and "Rock Medley")
- 2009: Pop Medley 2 (medley of several pop and rock songs)
- 2009: Unplugged (not really an unplugged album, includes also non-unplugged songs)
- 2015: Pop Medley 3 (medley of several pop and rock songs)
- 2017: Pop Medley 4 (medley of several pop and rock songs)
- 2019: Covered

=== Compilations ===
- 2010: Medley CD/DVD (includes "Pop Medley 1", "Pop Medley 2" and "Rock Medley")
- 2010: Jukebox (consists of 15 CDs with almost 300 hundred songs and one DVD of 700 songs)
- 2015: The Best of 1985–2015

== Videography ==
=== DVDs and Blu-rays ===
- 2005: Live at Durty Nellies (includes also an audio CD of the concert)
- 2010: Live at Soldier Field
- 2011: Live at Schaumburg Septemberfest
- 2014: Return to Schaumburg Live
- 2015: Live on the Oasis of the Seas
- 2018: Live on the Harmony of the Seas 2017
