= The Wild Boys (song) =

1984 song by Duran Duran

Single by Duran Duran

from the album Arena
- B-side: "(I'm Looking For) Cracks in the Pavement" (1984)
- Released: 18 October 1984 (US); 22 October 1984 (UK)
- Recorded: July 1984
- Studio: Maison Rouge (London)
- Genre: Dance-punk; pop; synth-pop
- Length: 4:18
- Label: EMI
- Songwriters: Simon Le Bon; John Taylor; Roger Taylor; Andy Taylor; Nick Rhodes
- Producer: Nile Rodgers

Duran Duran UK singles chronology
| "The Reflex" (1984) | "The Wild Boys" (1984) | "A View to a Kill" (1985) |

Duran Duran US singles chronology
| "The Reflex" (1984) | "The Wild Boys" (1984) | "Save a Prayer" (1985) |

Music video
- "The Wild Boys" on YouTube

"The Wild Boys" is a song by the English pop rock band Duran Duran, released on 18 October 1984 as the only single from their live album Arena (1984).

The song was the only studio track on the band's live album Arena (1984), and was produced by Nile Rodgers, who had previously remixed the band's previous single "The Reflex". It was recorded at the end of July 1984 at Maison Rouge Studios in London.

== Background ==
The idea for the song came from longtime Duran Duran video director Russell Mulcahy, who wanted to make a full-length feature film based on the surreal and sexual 1971 novel The Wild Boys: A Book of the Dead by William S. Burroughs. He suggested that the band might create a modern soundtrack for the film in the same way that Queen would later provide a rock soundtrack for Mulcahy's 1986 film Highlander. Lead vocalist Simon Le Bon began writing some lyrics based on Mulcahy's quick synopsis of the book, and the band created a harsh-sounding instrumental backdrop for them, taking inspiration from the groove of the hit single "Relax" by Frankie Goes to Hollywood.

The single was issued with six separate collectible covers – one featuring each individual band member and one of the band collectively.

== Critical reception ==
Cash Box called the song "a rolling pop tune with a tribal intensity". Billboard suggested that it sounds like "'Reflex' revisited".

== Chart performances ==
"The Wild Boys" became one of the band's highest-charting singles, peaking at number two on the US Billboard Hot 100 for four weeks, while reaching the top spot on the US Cash Box Top Singles chart and in Germany and South Africa. It peaked at number two on the UK Singles Chart and on the Irish Singles Chart, as well as in several European countries. It also became the band's highest-peaking single in Australia, reaching number three. As of October 2021, "The Wild Boys" is the 10th-most streamed Duran Duran song in the UK.

== Music video ==
The music video for "The Wild Boys" was directed by Russell Mulcahy. The cost totalled around US$1 million, a staggering sum for music videos at the time, as his design filled one entire end of the "007 Stage" at Pinewood Studios with a metal pyramid and a windmill over a deep enclosed pool, and called for a lifelike robotic face, dozens of elaborate costumes, prosthetics, and make-up effects, and then-cutting-edge computer graphics. The choreography of dance routines was undertaken by Arlene Phillips, including intricate stunts and fire effects added to the cost. Mulcahy meant the video to be a teaser for his full-length Burroughs film, demonstrating his vision to the movie studios he was wooing, but that project was never made. Mulcahy later recalled a ten-day shoot on a "gigantic set" at Shepperton Studios, and John Taylor said that Mulcahy had optioned the book, the film fell through in development, and the ideas developed for it were used in the video instead.

The video featured all of the band members imprisoned and in peril, wearing uncharacteristically rough and ragged outfits similar to the pieced-together clothing of the film Mad Max 2 (1981). John Taylor was strapped to the roof of a car suffering a psycho-torture with pictures of his childhood and early past; Nick Rhodes was caged with a pile of computer equipment; Roger Taylor was put in a hot-air balloon that was dangling from the ceiling, leaving him high off the ground; Andy Taylor was bound (guitar and all) to a ship's figurehead; and Simon Le Bon was strapped to a blade of the windpump, his head dunked in water as the blade passed through the pool.

"The Wild Boys" was named British Video of the Year at the 1985 Brit Awards.

== Remixes and B-sides ==
The 8:00 12" "Wilder Than Wild Boys" extended mix, the only official contemporaneous remix, is actually the full length version. It continues after the album/single version's fade out with another instrumental section, then repeats the chorus to fade. This mix was also used for the full length promo video.

To promote the release of the compilation album Greatest in 1998, EMI commissioned a number of remixes, including two mixes of "The Wild Boys" that were released only on promo discs:

- "The Wild Boys [ASAP & PM Project Remix]" (3:42) appeared on a one-track promo CD in Spain
- "Wild Boys 98 [4 on da Floor Remix]" (3:10) appeared on a one-track promo CD in Belgium

In 2004, noted remixer Paul Dakeyne and the Mitchell Project produced the 7:30 "Wicked 'n Wild Dub" for DMC, the UK-based remix service.

The original single B-side, "(I'm Looking For) Cracks in the Pavement" (1984), was recorded at the 5 March 1984 show at Maple Leaf Gardens in Toronto. This is the same concert where the video for "The Reflex" was filmed.

== Formats and track listings ==
7": Parlophone / Duran 3 UK

1. "The Wild Boys" (45) – 4:14
2. "(I'm Looking For) Cracks in the Pavement" (1984) – 4:00
- Track 2 recorded live at Maple Leaf Gardens, Toronto, 5 March 1984.
- Also released in sleeves featuring individual band members (DURANC 3)

12": Parlophone / 12 Duran 3 UK

1. "The Wild Boys" (Wilder Than the Wild Boys) (extended mix) – 8:00
2. "The Wild Boys" (45) – 4:16
3. "(I'm Looking For) Cracks in the Pavement" (1984) – 4:08
- Track 3 recorded live at Maple Leaf Gardens, Toronto, 5 March 1984.

7": Capitol / B-5417 US

1. "The Wild Boys" (45) – 4:14
2. "(I'm Looking For) Cracks in the Pavement" (1984) – 4:00
- Track 2 recorded live at Maple Leaf Gardens, Toronto, 5 March 1984.

12": Capitol / V-6817 US

1. "The Wild Boys" (Wilder Than the Wild Boys) (extended mix) – 8:00
2. "The Wild Boys" (45) – 4:16
3. "(I'm Looking For) Cracks in the Pavement" (1984) – 4:08
- Track 3 recorded live at Maple Leaf Gardens, Toronto, 5 March 1984.

CD: Part of Singles Box Set 1981–1985

1. "The Wild Boys" (45) – 4:16
2. "(I'm Looking For) Cracks in the Pavement" (1984) – 4:08
3. "The Wild Boys" (Wilder Than the Wild Boys) (extended mix) – 8:00
- Track 2 recorded live at Maple Leaf Gardens, Toronto, 5 March 1984.

== Charts ==
=== Weekly charts ===
Weekly chart performance for "The Wild Boys"
| Chart (1984–1985) | Peak position |
|---|---|
| Australia (Kent Music Report) | 3 |
| Austria (Ö3 Austria Top 40) | 2 |
| Belgium (Ultratop 50 Flanders) | 2 |
| Canada Top Singles (RPM) | 2 |
| Europe (European Top 100 Singles) | 4 |
| Finland (Suomen virallinen lista) | 4 |
| France (IFOP) | 9 |
| France (SNEP) | 13 |
| Ireland (IRMA) | 2 |
| Israel (Israeli Singles Chart) | 2 |
| Italy (Musica e dischi) | 2 |
| Netherlands (Dutch Top 40) | 2 |
| Netherlands (Single Top 100) | 3 |
| New Zealand (Recorded Music NZ) | 5 |
| Norway (VG-lista) | 6 |
| South Africa (Springbok Radio) | 1 |
| Spain (AFYVE) | 3 |
| Spain Airplay (Top 40 Radio) | 18 |
| Sweden (Sverigetopplistan) | 19 |
| Switzerland (Schweizer Hitparade) | 2 |
| UK Singles (Official Charts) | 2 |
| US Billboard Hot 100 | 2 |
| US Dance Club Songs (Billboard) | 27 |
| US Cash Box Top 100 | 1 |
| West Germany (GfK) | 1 |

=== Year-end charts ===
1984 year-end chart performance for "The Wild Boys"
| Chart (1984) | Position |
|---|---|
| Australia (Kent Music Report) | 79 |
| Belgium (Ultratop 50 Flanders) | 48 |
| Canada Top Singles (RPM) | 38 |
| Netherlands (Dutch Top 40) | 45 |
| Netherlands (Single Top 100) | 20 |
| UK Singles (Gallup) | 33 |

1985 year-end chart performance for "The Wild Boys"
| Chart (1985) | Position |
|---|---|
| Austria (Ö3 Austria Top 40) | 24 |
| Belgium (Ultratop 50 Flanders) | 100 |
| Canada Top Singles (RPM) | 88 |
| South Africa (Springbok Radio) | 15 |
| Switzerland (Schweizer Hitparade) | 27 |
| US Billboard Hot 100 | 36 |
| US Cash Box Top 100 Singles | 82 |
| West Germany (Official German Charts) | 11 |

== Certifications ==
Certifications for "The Wild Boys"
| Region | Certification | Certified units/sales |
|---|---|---|
| Canada (Music Canada) | Gold | 50,000^{^} |
| Germany (BVMI) | Gold | 500,000^{^} |
| United Kingdom (BPI) | Silver | 250,000^{^} |
| United States (RIAA) | Gold | 500,000^{^} |
^{^} Shipments figures based on certification alone.

== Phixx version ==
"Wild Boys"

Single by Phixx

from the album Electrophonic Revolution
- Released: June 2004
- Length: 4:04
- Label: Concept
- Songwriters: Simon Le Bon; John Taylor; Roger Taylor; Andy Taylor; Nick Rhodes

Phixx singles chronology
| "Love Revolution" (2004) | "Wild Boys" (2004) | "Strange Love" (2005) |

English-Irish boy band Phixx released their version in 2004 which peaked at No. 12 on the UK Singles Chart.

== See also ==
- List of number-one hits of 1984 (Germany)
- List of number-one hits of 1985 (Italy)
- List of Cash Box Top 100 number-one singles of 1984
