= Dirtee Cash =

Single by Dizzee Rascal

from the album Tongue n' Cheek
- Released: 21 September 2009
- Recorded: 2008–09
- Genre: Grime; house
- Length: 3:16 (radio edit); 4:21 (extended mix)
- Label: Dirtee Stank; Liberation
- Composer(s): Nick Cage
- Lyricist(s): Dylan Mills
- Producer(s): Nick Denton

Dizzee Rascal singles chronology
"Holiday" (2009)	"Dirtee Cash" (2009)	"You Got the Dirtee Love" (2010)

"Dirtee Cash" is a song recorded by the British rapper Dizzee Rascal and was released as the fourth single from his fourth studio album Tongue n' Cheek. It was released digitally on 21 September 2009 and follows his No. 1 hits "Holiday" and "Bonkers". It is his first solo song from the album and has to date reached No. 10 in the UK.

The song samples "Dirty Cash (Money Talks)" by the British dance act The Adventures of Stevie V. Dizzee told The Sun that the song is about "how if you ain't got money, but you still spend it anyway, life is gonna bite you in the arse".

== Music video ==
On 4 October 2009, Dizzee said in an interview on The Radio 1 Chart Show that a music video had been filmed in London for the single. He said that the music video was based around The Wicker Man. The video contains political extremes and caricatures of things and people of Britain's history. These include Margaret Thatcher, Princess Diana and events such as the suffragette movement. In the conclusion of the video, books are burnt and, in the final shot, the text of William Blake's "And did those feet in ancient time" is destroyed like rubbish. This may be a reflection on the value of things past and how in the event of other circumstances may be lost to humanity forever.

The video premiered on 4Music on 20 October 2009.

== Commercial performance ==
"Dirtee Cash" entered the UK Singles Chart at No. 11 on 27 September 2009 via downloads alone and peaked at No. 10 the following week. The single was released physically on 23 November 2009, placing at No. 38 that week. It was the first single from Tongue 'N Cheek not to reach No. 1 on the UK Singles Chart.

The single was released through Dizzee's own Dirtee Stank label and distributed by PIAS Recordings, therefore it qualified for the UK Indie Chart, where it reached No. 1 for two consecutive weeks.

== Track listing ==
- Digital download
1. "Dirtee Cash" (radio edit) – 3:16
2. "Dirtee Cash" (extended mix) – 4:21
3. "Dirtee Cash" (BBC Radio One Live Lounge edit) – 3:39
4. "Dirtee Cash" (Sub Focus mix) – 4:05
5. "Dirtee Cash" (Phonat mix) – 3:06
6. "Dirtee Cash" (music video) – 3:47
- CD single
1. "Dirtee Cash" (radio edit) – 3:18
2. "Dirtee Cash" (extended mix) – 4:22
3. "Dirtee Cash" (BBC Radio One Live Lounge edit) – 3:42
4. "Dirtee Cash" (Sub Focus mix) – 4:07
- 12" vinyl
1. "Dirtee Cash" (radio edit) – 3:18
2. "Dirtee Cash" (Sub Focus mix) – 4:07

== Charts ==
=== Weekly charts ===
Weekly chart performance for "Dirtee Cash"
Chart (2009)	Peak position
Australian ARIA Club Chart	3
UK Singles (OCC)	10
UK Indie (OCC)	1

=== Year-end charts ===
Year-end chart performance for "Dirtee Cash"
Chart (2009)	Position
UK Singles Chart	134

== Certifications ==
Certifications for "Dirtee Cash"
Region	Certification	Certified units/sales
United Kingdom (BPI)	Silver	200,000^{‡}
^{‡} Sales+streaming figures based on certification alone.

== Release history ==
Release history and formats for "Dirtee Cash"
Region	Date	Format	Label
United Kingdom	21 September 2009	Digital download	Dirtee Stank; Liberation
United Kingdom	23 November 2009	CD single	Dirtee Stank; Liberation

== See also ==
- "You Got the Dirtee Love"
