= Dirtee Disco =

2010 single by Dizzee Rascal

Single by Dizzee Rascal

from the album Tongue n' Cheek Deluxe Edition
- Released: 23 May 2010
- Recorded: 2009–2010
- Genre: Hip house; nu-disco
- Length: 3:40
- Label: Dirtee Stank
- Songwriter: Dizzee Rascal

Dizzee Rascal singles chronology
""You Got the Dirtee Love"" (2010)	"Dirtee Disco" (2010)	"Shout" (2010)

"Dirtee Disco" is the fifth single from English rapper Dizzee Rascal's fourth studio album Tongue n' Cheek, although the song only appears in the deluxe edition of the album. It features background vocals from former One True Voice member Daniel Pearce and samples The Staple Singers' 1972 track, "I'll Take You There". It was released on 23 May 2010 by digital download.

== Content ==
The song overlaps thematically with Rascal's earlier singles "Holiday" and "Dance wiv Me", discussing nights out and good times.

== Critical reception ==
Robert Copsey of Digital Spy gave the song a negative review, stating:

'Dirtee Disco' is a '70s-influenced party tune on which Dizz raps about doing the robot, drinking JD and Coke and wrapping his hands around the nearest girl's waist over some oh-so-groovy beats. Featuring vocals from none other than One True Voice alumnus and former X Factor hopeful Daniel Pearce, it's more likely to remind you of your local Flares nightclub than the hedonistic heyday of Studio 54. Close to the start of the track, Dizz warns: "If you can't say something nice, then keep quiet." We'd better keep our lips firmly shut then..

== Music video ==
In the comedic music video, Rascal and his accomplices enter the setting of a disco in a typical British church or village hall. The hall used for the video is St Hilda's Church Hall in South East London, pictured.

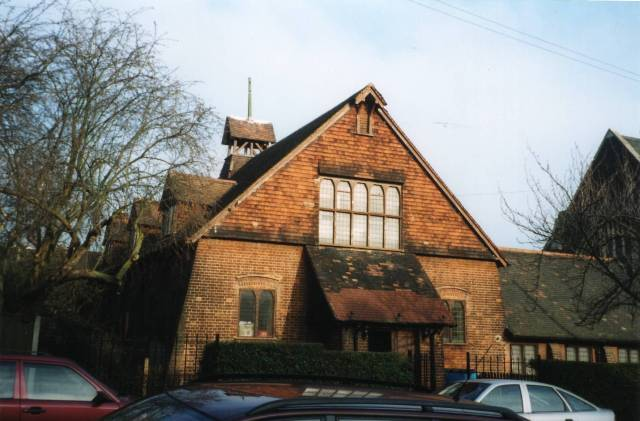
St Hilda's church hall, Courtrai Road - geograph.org.uk - 221147

The disco is hosted by older Mobile DJ character, played by DJ Derek, in aid of a church fundraiser. The disco is rather quiet until Rascal and his comrades gatecrash, arriving in a stretched Limousine Hummer, the party then gets going. He is accompanied by a number of attractive women that are much younger than the other dancers, they are all dressed for clubbing.

The older people are initially shocked at Rascal and the women he is with. The party then escalates with various dancing and everyone involved taking part. As the song ends, the DJ announces "OK, that was Dizzee Rascal and Dirtee Disco. Some wicked moves out there. Well it's nearly 10 o'clock, and the night is almost over. So it's time to slow things down a bit." The DJ then puts on a slow song and everyone waltzes for the remainder of the video.

Rascal told the NME about the video: "There's no Saturday Night Fever influence. That's not John Travolta strutting, that's me, wearing a £2,000 Gucci suit. The moves are more influenced by You Don't Mess with the Zohan. Keep an eye out for the models – I chose them. The video's about being able to have a good time wherever you go, whether it's a club or a church hall."

== Commercial performance ==
"Dirtee Disco" debuted on the UK Singles Chart at number one on 30 May 2010, marking Dizzee Rascal's fourth number one hit in the country. The single also managed to debut on the Irish Singles Chart at number twenty-one on 28 May 2010. Despite being a No. 1 in the UK, it became the lowest-selling one of the year.

== Track listings ==
UK iTunes digital download

1. "Dirtee Disco" (Radio Edit) – 3:40
2. "Dirtee Disco" (Club Mix) – 4:46

== Charts ==
Chart performance for "Dirtee Disco"
Chart (2010)	Peak position
Australia (ARIA)	68
Ireland (IRMA)	21
Scotland Singles (OCC)	1
UK Singles (OCC)	1
UK Indie (OCC)	1
UK Hip Hop/R&B (OCC)	1

=== Year-end charts ===
Year-end chart performance for "Dirtee Disco"
Chart (2010)	Position
UK Singles (OCC)	111

== Certifications ==
Certifications for "Dirtee Disco"
Region	Certification	Certified units/sales
United Kingdom (BPI)	Silver	200,000^{^}
^{^} Shipments figures based on certification alone.
