= Tongue n' Cheek =

Studio album by Dizzee Rascal
- Released: 20 September 2009
- Recorded: 2008–2009
- Genres: Dance; hip-hop
- Length: 41:32
- Labels: Dirtee Stank; Liberation
- Producers: Cage; Tiësto; Shy FX; Calvin Harris; Danja; Armand Van Helden

Dizzee Rascal chronology
Maths + English (2007)	Tongue n' Cheek (2009)	The Fifth (2013)

Singles from Tongue n' Cheek
- 1. "Dance wiv Me" Released: 30 June 2008; 2. "Bonkers" Released: 17 May 2009; 3. "Holiday" Released: 23 August 2009; 4. "Dirtee Cash" Released: 21 September 2009; 5. "You Got the Dirtee Love" Released: 17 February 2010; 6. "Dirtee Disco" Released: 23 May 2010

Tongue n' Cheek is the fourth studio album by British rapper Dizzee Rascal. The album was released on 20 September 2009 and includes the number one singles, "Dance wiv Me", "Bonkers", "Holiday" and "Dirtee Disco". It has been certified platinum by the BPI for sales of over 300,000, making it the best-selling album of Rascal's career.

== Background ==
Its release was announced on Friday Night with Jonathan Ross when, in an interview, Rascal revealed details including track information and production. He confirmed in an interview on Radio 1 that he is leaving his grime roots behind, in favour of more mainstream pop music. On 23 May 2009, Calvin Harris revealed on his Twitter that he was producing a Dizzee track. At the Evolution Festival in Newcastle upon Tyne, he confirmed that there will be two new singles from the album called "Road Rage" and "Dirtee Cash". Dirtee Cash heavily samples The Adventures of Stevie V song "Dirty Cash.". Samples are also used on "Can't Tek No More" ("Warrior's Charge" by Aswad from the film Babylon) and "Chillin' Wiv da Man Dem" ("Oh Honey" by Delegation).

In early August the track listing was confirmed in a preview of the album by music website NME.

Notably, Rascal designed a Nike-distributed Tongue n' Cheek shoe, to be in released at the same time as the album. The proceeds from these shoes going to Tower Hamlets Summer University of which Rascal is a patron.

== Release and chart performance ==
On 27 September 2009, Tongue n' Cheek entered the UK Albums Chart at number 3, charting behind Muse's The Resistance and Madonna's Celebration.

== Critical reception ==
Professional ratings
Aggregate scores
Source	Rating
Metacritic	75/100
Review scores
Source	Rating
AllMusic	4/5 stars
Drowned in Sound	6/10
The Guardian	4/5 stars
musicOMH	4/5 stars
NME	7/10
Pitchfork	7.5/10
PopMatters	8/10
Slant Magazine	3.5/5 stars
The Telegraph	4/5 stars
The Times	4/5 stars

Tongue n' Cheek received positive reviews from music critics. At Metacritic, which assigns a normalised rating out of 100 to reviews from mainstream critics, the album received an average score of 75 based on 14 reviews, which indicates "generally favorable reviews". The Guardian gave the album 4 out of 5 stars, opining: "If it's less wilfully uncommercial than his earlier oeuvre, which frequently made the listener feel like they were being mugged in the middle of an amusement arcade, its distorted synthesisers are still edgily thrilling". Pitchfork's Ian Cohen gave the album 7.5/10, saying that "He sounds damn good over trashy, flashy electro that manages to keep pace with cadences as hyperactive as his own, and, above all, he's way more fun than he's often given credit for".

NME gave the album 7/10 and wrote that "The beats on Tongue N' Cheek are still raw, clamorous and unpredictable, but in a springy, primary-coloured way". Q magazine gave it a favourable review, saying "It's been a long time coming, but Brit-rap's first genuinely huge album is here". musicOMH gave it 4 out of 5 stars and wrote: "There's a party to be had and Dizzee's in charge, but don't forget to engage your brain for at least some of it". Observer Music Monthly gave it 4 out of 5 stars, writing: "It unquestionably adds up to a pop record sharp enough to be the bratty but irresistible younger brother of Lily Allen's "It's Not Me, It's You". RapReviews gave the album 8.5/10 and judged: "All in all, Dizzee hasn't gone all out to make an artistic masterpiece, but it doesn't make the slightest bit of difference".

== Track listing ==
All tracks are written by Dizzee Rascal.

Tongue n' Cheek – Standard edition
No.	Title	Producer	Length
1.	"Bonkers"	Armand Van Helden	2:57
2.	"Road Rage"	Aaron LaCrate; Debonair Samir	3:14
3.	"Dance wiv Me"	Calvin Harris	3:24
4.	"Freaky Freaky"	Cage	3:42
5.	"Can't Tek No More"	Shy FX	3:28
6.	"Chillin' wiv da Man Dem"	Cage	4:39
7.	"Dirtee Cash"	Cage	4:21
8.	"Money, Money"	Cage; Dizzee Rascal	3:23
9.	"Leisure"	Cage; Footsie	4:13
10.	"Holiday"	Calvin Harris	3:40
11.	"Bad Behaviour"	Tiësto; Danja	4:31
Total length:			41:32

Tongue N' Cheek – Dirtee Deluxe edition (bonus disc)
No.	Title	Writer(s)	Length
1.	"Dirtee Disco"	Dizzee Rascal; Armand Van Helden	3:58
2.	"Nuffin' Long"		4:07
3.	"Marks Outta Ten"		3:55
4.	"Heavy"		3:35
5.	"Doin' It Big"		4:05
6.	"You Got the Dirtee Love" (Recorded live at the 2010 BRIT Awards)		3:38
7.	"Brand New Day" (Recorded live at the BBC Electric Proms 2009)		4:52
8.	"Fix Up Look Sharp" (Recorded live at the BBC Electric Proms 2009)		5:47
9.	"Bonkers" (Remixed by Doorly)		4:32
10.	"Holiday" (Remixed by Laidback Luke)		7:10

Foot n' Mouth – HMV exclusive (bonus disc)
No.	Title	Length
1.	"Introduction"
2.	"DJ Semtex and Dizzee Rascal" (skit)
3.	"Butterfly" (snippet)
4.	"Holiday" (snippet, featuring Chrome)
5.	"Dance wiv Me" (snippet, featuring Calvin Harris and Chrome)
6.	"Bonkers" (snippet, with Armand Van Helden)
7.	"DJ Semtex interviews Newham Generals" (Newham Generals, skit)
8.	"Hard" (Newham Generals, snippet)
9.	"Mind is a Gun" (Newham Generals, snippet)
10.	"DJ Semtex interviews Smurfie Syco"
11.	"Laugh" (Smurfie Syco)
12.	"Dizzee Rascal talks about forthcoming Dirtee Stank project 'Manic Music'"
13.	"Warrior Within" (featuring D Double E and Footsie)
14.	"Dizze Rascal, D Double E, Footsie and Smurfie Syco" (freestyle)
Total length:		27:54

Notes

- A bonus disc entitled "Foot n' Mouth" came free with the album when purchased from HMV.

== Charts ==
=== Weekly charts ===
Chart (2009)	Peak position
Australian Albums (ARIA)	18
Belgian Albums (Ultratop Flanders)	24
Irish Albums (IRMA)	20
New Zealand Albums (RMNZ)	9
UK Albums (Official Charts)	3
UK R&B Albums (Official Charts)	1

=== Year-end charts ===
Chart (2009)	Position
UK Albums (OCC)	64
Chart (2010)	Position
UK Albums (OCC)	86

== Certifications ==
Country	Provider	Certification	Sales
United Kingdom	BPI	Platinum	300,000
