= Sacred Trust / After You're Gone =

2002 single by One True Voice

"Sacred Trust" / "After You're Gone"

Single by One True Voice
- Released: 16 December 2002
- Recorded: 2002
- Genre: Pop
- Length: 4:45 ("Sacred Trust"); 4:08 ("After You're Gone")
- Label: Jive, Ebul
- Songwriters: Barry, Robin and Maurice Gibb ("Sacred Trust"); Steve Parker, Pete Waterman, Daniel Pearce ("After You're Gone")
- Producer: Work in Progress

One True Voice singles chronology
"Sacred Trust" / "After You're Gone" (2002)	"Shakespeare's (Way with) Words" (2003)

Music video
- "Sacred Trust" on YouTube

Music video
- "After You're Gone" on YouTube

"Sacred Trust" and "After You're Gone" are two songs by British boy band One True Voice, the male winners of Popstars: The Rivals. The two songs were issued as a double-A side single on 16 December 2002, the same day that female winners Girls Aloud released their single "Sound of the Underground". The two singles competed for the coveted Christmas number one spot on the UK Singles Chart. "Sacred Trust" / "After You're Gone" reached number two on that chart, beaten to the top by "Sound of the Underground". The double A-side also reached number nine in Ireland.

"Sacred Trust" is a cover version of a song originally written and produced by the Bee Gees from their 2001 album This Is Where I Came In.

== Release and reception ==
One True Voice were formed in November 2002 on the ITV1 programme Popstars: The Rivals. The concept of the programme was to produce a boyband and a girl group who would be 'rivals' and compete for the Christmas number one single in 2002. The five boys who made it into the group which was to be managed by Pete Waterman were Daniel Pearce, Matt Johnson, Keith Semple, Jamie Shaw, and Anton Gordon. The boy band were managed by Pete Waterman. The two groups competed for the number one position in the Christmas week issue of the UK Singles Chart, and Girls Aloud came out on top with their song "Sound of the Underground". Girls Aloud later released their own version of "Sacred Trust" on the rarities disc of their 2006 greatest hits album The Sound of Girls Aloud.

== Chart performance ==
"Sacred Trust" / "After You're Gone" debuted at number two on the UK Singles Chart on 22 December 2002, the same day as their rivals Girls Aloud reached number one with "Sound of the Underground". The single sold 147,000 copies compared to first week sales of 213,000 for "Sound of the Underground". In Ireland, it charted at number nine while Girls Aloud entered the chart at number two. It remained in both charts for six weeks.

== Track listing ==
No.	Title	Writers	Length
1.	"Sacred Trust"	Robin Gibb, Barry Gibb, Maurice Gibb	4:45
2.	"After You're Gone (I'll Still Be Loving You)"	Steve Parker, Pete Waterman, Daniel Pearce	4:08

== Charts ==
=== Weekly charts ===
Chart (2002–2003)	Peak position
Europe (Eurochart Hot 100)	3
Ireland (IRMA)	9
Scotland Singles (OCC)	2
UK Singles (OCC)	2
UK Airplay (Music Week)	21
UK Indie (OCC)	1

=== Year-end charts ===
Chart (2002)	Position
UK Singles (OCC)	38

Chart (2003)	Position
UK Singles (OCC)	147

== Certifications ==
Region	Certification	Certified units/sales
United Kingdom (BPI)	Gold	400,000^{^}
^{^} Shipments figures based on certification alone.
