= Phixx =

British boy band

- Origin: United Kingdom
- Genres: Pop, electropop
- Years active: 2003–2006
- Labels: Concept Records, Sheer Music
- Past members: Mikey Green; Andrew Kinlochan; Nikk Mager; Chris Park; Peter Smith

Phixx were a British boy band formed in 2003 from the five runners up on British TV show Popstars: The Rivals. The original members were Andrew Kinlochan, Chris Park, Mikey Green, Peter Smith, and Nikk Mager. Between 2003 and 2005, they achieved four top 20 singles in the UK. They broke up in 2006.

In February 2003, they signed to Hyperactive Management, who had previously been successful with Liberty X. In October 2003, they released their first single, "Hold on Me", on the Concept Records label, which charted at number 10 in the UK, selling over 60,000 copies.

In 2024, Nikk Mager was announced as a new member of the Bucks Fizz spin-off The Fizz, alongside Matthew Pateman of Let Loose and Bad Boys Inc.

The band's albums include Electrophonic Revolution. Singles include a version of "Wild Boys"

== Members ==
- Mikey Green (2003–2006)
- Andrew Kinlochan (2003–2006)
- Nikk Mager (2003–2006)
- Chris Park (2003–2006)
- Peter Smith (2003–2004)

== Discography ==
=== Studio albums ===
- Electrophonic Revolution (2004)

=== Singles ===
- "Hold on Me"
- "Wild Boys"
- "Love Revolution"
- "Strange Love"
