= Holiday (Dizzee Rascal song) =

2009 single by Dizzee Rascal

Single by Dizzee Rascal

from the album Tongue n' Cheek
- Released: 23 August 2009
- Recorded: April 2009
- Genre: Hip house
- Length: 3:39
- Label: Dirtee Stank
- Songwriters: Dizzee Rascal; Calvin Harris; Nick Detnon
- Producer: Calvin Harris

Dizzee Rascal singles chronology
"Bonkers" (2009)	"Holiday" (2009)	"Dirtee Cash" (2009)

"Holiday" is a song by English rapper Dizzee Rascal, released as the third single from his fourth studio album, Tongue n' Cheek. It was produced by Calvin Harris, with chorus vocals by R&B singer Chrome. Harris originally wrote the song for girl group, The Saturdays, but it was rejected. The song was released digitally on 23 August 2009, with a physical copy that followed on 31 August 2009. The single debuted in the UK at number-one upon initial release, bringing Dizzee's total of number-one singles to three (four including charity singles), as well as marking the fourth top ten hit and twelfth top forty hit from the rapper.

== Critical reception ==
Vicki of BBC Chart Blog gave the song a positive review stating:

"'Holiday' is a totally cheesy but totally harmless, fun song. It's designed to give people that are on holiday a great excuse to dance madly and us folks back home in Britain who need that holiday an even greater one. This song hasn't got the explosive feel that 'Bonkers' has and thus it doesn't have the same sense of longevity, but what it does have is a very now feel (not least because this song wouldn't have worked so well in November...)

Looking out the window now as I reach the end of this review, I'm amazed to see it has stopped raining and that the sun is trying to peep through the clouds. But then, maybe I shouldn't be that surprised – after all, this has officially been Dizzee's summer and this song is a little ray of sunshine." The song was awarded a 4 star.

== Track listing ==
- CD single
1. "Holiday" (Radio Edit) – 3:41
2. "Holiday" (Extended Mix) – 6:02
3. "Holiday" (R'n'B Mix) – 3:25
4. "Live, Large N' In Charge" – 3:51
- 12" single
1. "Holiday" (Radio Edit)
2. "Holiday" (R'n'B Mix)
3. "Live, Large N' In Charge"
4. "Holiday" (Acappella)
5. "Holiday" (Instrumental)
- iTunes Australian single
1. "Holiday" (Radio Edit)
2. "Holiday" (Extended Mix)
3. "Live Large 'N' In Charge"
- iTunes UK EP
1. "Holiday" (Radio Edit)
2. "Holiday" (Extended Mix)
3. "Holiday" (R'n'B Mix)
4. "Live Large 'N' In Charge"
5. "Holiday" (Music Video)

== Credits and personnel ==
- Writers: Dylan Mills, Calvin Harris, Nick Detnon
- Producer: Calvin Harris
- Mastering Mike Marsh
- Instruments performed and arranged by Calvin Harris
- Mixing: Calvin Harris
- Lyrics written and performed by Dizzee Rascal
- Chorus vocals performed by Chrome
- Vocals recorded and produced by Nick Cage

== Charts ==
=== Weekly charts ===
Chart (2009)	Peak position
Australia (ARIA)	30
Belgium (Ultratop 50 Flanders)	20
Netherlands (Single Top 100)	68
Germany (GfK)	78
Ireland (IRMA)	5
New Zealand (Recorded Music NZ)	6
UK Singles (Official Charts)	1
UK Indie (Official Charts)	1

=== Year-end charts ===
Chart (2009)	Position
UK Singles Chart	57

== Certifications ==
Certification for "Holiday"
Region	Certification	Certified units/sales
Australia (ARIA)	Gold	35,000^{‡}
New Zealand (RMNZ)	Platinum	30,000^{‡}
United Kingdom (BPI)	2× Platinum	1,200,000^{‡}
^{‡} Sales+streaming figures based on certification alone.

== Release history ==
Region	Date	Format	Label
United Kingdom	23 August 2009	Digital download	Dirtee Stank
Australia	28 August 2009	Digital download	Liberation
United Kingdom	31 August 2009	CD single	Dirtee Stank
