= Shakespeare's (Way with) Words =

2003 single by One True Voice

Single by One True Voice
- Released: 2 June 2003
- Length: 3:38
- Label: Jive, Ebul
- Songwriters: Rick Astley, Kevin Hughes
- Producers: Pete Waterman, Mark Topham, Karl Twigg

One True Voice singles chronology
"Sacred Trust / After You're Gone" (2002)	"Shakespeare's (Way with) Words" (2003)

Music video
- "Shakespeare's (Way with) Words" on YouTube

"Shakespeare's (Way with) Words" is a song by Popstars: The Rivals male winners One True Voice, released on 2 June 2003. The song was the second and final release by the band, as they split up in August 2003 without having released an album. The song reached number 10 on the UK Singles Chart and number 39 in Ireland.

== Track listings ==
UK CD1

1. "Shakespeare's (Way with) Words" (radio edit)
2. "(In My Own) Simple Way"
3. "Shakespeare's (Way with) Words" (WIP 12-inch mix)
4. "Shakespeare's (Way with) Words" (video)

UK CD2

1. "Shakespeare's (Way with) Words" (radio edit)
2. "Sacred Trust" (WIP 12-inch mix)
3. Behind the scenes at the video shoot

UK cassette single

1. "Shakespeare's (Way with) Words" (radio edit)
2. "(In My Own) Simple Way"
3. "Shakespeare's (Way with) Words" (WIP 12-inch mix)

== Charts ==
Chart (2003)	Peak position
Europe (Eurochart Hot 100)	35
Ireland (IRMA)	39
Scottish Singles Sales (Official Charts)	8
UK Singles (Official Charts)	10
UK Indie (Official Charts)	6
