= Popstars: The Rivals =

British television talent show series

- Genre: Reality competition
- Presented by: Davina McCall
- Judges: Pete Waterman; Louis Walsh; Geri Halliwell
- Country of origin: United Kingdom
- Original language: English
- No. of series: 1
- No. of episodes: 18

Production
- Executive producers: Nigel Hall; Duncan Gray
- Producers: Claudia Rosencrantz; Nicholas Steinberg
- Running time: 30–60 minutes (inc. adverts)
- Production company: LWT

Original release
- Network: ITV
- Release: 7 September – 22 December 2002

Related
- Popstars

Popstars: The Rivals is a British television talent show series, broadcast on ITV in late 2002. It was the second British series of the international Popstars franchise. Unlike Popstars, which resulted in the formation of one winning group, Hear'Say (the other finalists went on to form Liberty X), Popstars: The Rivals created two rival groups, Girls Aloud and One True Voice, who competed for the Christmas number one spot on the UK Singles Chart. Girls Aloud won and went on to achieve 20 consecutive top-ten hits, including four number ones, and six top-ten albums, two of which reached number one. Group member Cheryl has achieved five solo number-one singles and two number-one albums.

Popstars: The Rivals aired on ITV on Saturday nights from 7 September 2002, beginning with three pre-recorded episodes of preliminary audition rounds before switching to live broadcasts of studio performances. During the rounds of the live show, viewers voted for their favourite performers by telephone and the Red Button on digital television remote controls. In the final weeks, five women and five men were chosen by viewers to form the two groups, boy band One True Voice and girl group Girls Aloud. The final episode of Popstars: The Rivals aired live on 22 December 2002. During the broadcast, Pepsi Chart Show presenter Neil Fox revealed in a live link-up that "Sound of the Underground", recorded by Girls Aloud, had reached number one on the Singles Chart, thereby becoming the Christmas number one. One True Voice's double A-side single "Sacred Trust/After You're Gone" entered the chart at number two.

The series was hosted by Davina McCall, with the performances judged by Pete Waterman, Louis Walsh and Geri Halliwell. In addition to the main show, Popstars: The Rivals Extra aired on both ITV2 after the main ITV show on Saturdays and also as a teatime show on ITV during the week. Both versions of the show were presented by pop star Dane Bowers and Pop Idol finalist Hayley Evetts.

== Judges and presenters ==
=== Judges ===
On the judging panel, neither Nigel Lythgoe, Paul Adam nor Nicki Chapman, the three judges from the first series of Popstars, returned for Popstars: The Rivals. Lythgoe had left ITV to work with Simon Fuller at 19 Entertainment and become the executive producer of Pop Idol and American Idol, although he initially expressed an interest in appearing. Chapman also went to 19, where she managed the careers of Pop Idol winner and runner-up Will Young and Gareth Gates. Adam turned down the opportunity to return as he was too busy working as a music executive at RCA Records.

The judges for Popstars: The Rivals were announced as record producer and songwriter Pete Waterman, who worked with Kylie Minogue, Jason Donovan, Rick Astley and Steps amongst others as part of 1980–90s production trio Stock Aitken Waterman, Geri Halliwell, who rose to fame as part of the Spice Girls and later had a career as a solo popstar; and Chris Evans, who had presented breakfast shows on BBC Radio 1 and Virgin Radio, and The Big Breakfast and TFI Friday on Channel 4. Evans later decided not to appear, and after approaching Sharon Osbourne, producers chose Louis Walsh, a music manager who had represented Boyzone, Samantha Mumba, Ronan Keating and Westlife, and who had judged on the 2001 Irish edition of Popstars as the third judge.

=== Presenters ===
The series was presented by Davina McCall, who had hosted the Popstars finale in 2001, and also hosted Big Brother, God's Gift, Streetmate and Don't Try This at Home as well as hosting the Brit Awards in 2000 and 2003. Former Another Level singer Dane Bowers and former Popstars and Pop Idol contestant Hayley Evetts presented Popstars: The Rivals Extra on ITV2.

== Production ==
Popstars: The Rivals drew on the success of the first series of Popstars, which aired during early 2001, and Pop Idol, which aired in the winter months of 2001–2002. Popstars resulted in the formation of one winning pop group, Hear’Say, who was selected solely by the judges, but Pop Idol made extensive use of viewer interactivity with the home audience voting for their favourite act to win the competition either via the show's official website or by calling premium-rate telephone numbers. In the months since Popstars finished, the five runners-up of the show had formed their own group, Liberty X, and were enjoying more commercial success than Hear’Say. The British media had also begun to create a rivalry between the two groups.

The Popstars producers drew upon this rivalry for Popstars: The Rivals to create two winning pop groups, a boy band and a girl group, in a "battle of the sexes", to vie for the Christmas number one spot in the UK Singles Chart, a traditionally competitive time in the British music market. To further the rivalry, members of the public were to select who would remain in the show by voting for their favourite acts using premium-rate telephone numbers, text messaging, via the Popstars website, and with the Red Button on digital television remote controls. Each week, the singer with the fewest public votes would be eliminated from the competition until five men and five women remained, who would then form the two rival groups. Elements of Channel 4's Big Brother were used in Popstars: The Rivals when the final ten boys and final ten girls moved into two houses and lived together, watched by television cameras.

== Selection process ==
=== Applications and auditions ===
Initial auditions began on 9 August 2002 at the Wembley Conference Centre in London. and continued in a number of cities around the United Kingdom. This stage of the competition was broadcast over three episodes, with auditions taking place in London, Glasgow, Leeds and Manchester. Most contestants were invited to audition after sending in video tapes of themselves singing, but open auditions were also held at Wembley Conference Centre in Wembley, London on 9 August 2002 and at the Lowry Hotel in Manchester a week later. This was in response to the massive demand of the original Popstars series which had seen thousands turned away due to time restraints. Just two of the hopefuls advanced from the London open auditions.

The open auditions were broadcast across 3 episodes. Around 100 contestants made it through to the next round of the competition.

=== Bootcamp ===
The 102 remaining contestants had to travel to London for the bootcamp stage, where they were met by Davina McCall. With only 50 places available in the next round, the judges had tough decisions to make. The contestants were put through various workshops to test both their singing and dancing abilities. All contestants were able to choose a song to perform, while choreographers judged them on their dancing.

After two days of the workshop, 52 contestants failed to progress and left the competition. 13-year-old Stephanie McMichael was eliminated after producers discovered she had lied about her age and was below the age limit.

The final 50 were next reduced to 30 through another series of workshops. Pete Waterman mentored the boys, Louis Walsh oversaw the girls and Geri Halliwell acted as an intermediary between the two groups. After much deliberation, the judges called contestants to see them individually and deliver their verdicts.

=== Judges' visits ===
The last two episodes before the live shows saw the final 30 being reduced to a final 20, with five boys and five girls failing to make the cut. The three judges were assigned contestants to visit separately in their respective homes and deliver the good or bad news of whether they had reached the live finals. The remaining contestants would move into a house together for the live stages of the competition.

The ten eliminated acts were:

Boys – Justin Webb, Sean Haven, Owen Doyle, Jacob Thompson, Jeremy Medcalf

Girls – Kimberley Walsh, Pollyanna Woodward, Nicola Roberts, Annika Gabbitas, Charlie Houston

== Finalists ==
Ten men and ten women finalists were chosen to perform in the live shows. There was some controversy as one of the original finalists, Hazel Kaneswaran, was forced to pull out of the show because she was 10 days too old at the time of the auditions. The show had an age limit of 24 and Hazel had just turned 25. Her situation was further complicated by the fact that she was eight months pregnant. She had the baby in October 2002. Kimberley Walsh, one of the girls who did not make the final 10, took Kaneswaren's place for the live shows. A special half-hour episode was broadcast on 6 October 2002 to show these changes, with Geri Halliwell informing Hazel of her elimination and Louis Walsh inviting Kimberley back onto the show.

Nicola Roberts, who also failed to make it through, replaced 19-year-old Nicola Ward, who quit the show over what she considered "exploitation" of contestants by the producers.

=== Final 10 Boys ===
| Finalist | Age* | From | Status |
|---|---|---|---|
| Andrew Kinlochan | 23 | London | Eliminated 1st in Week 1 |
| Peter Smith | 25 | Dublin | Withdrew in Week 3 |
| Nikk Mager | 18 | Halifax | Eliminated 2nd in Week 3 |
| Michael "Mikey" Green | 22 | Manchester | Eliminated 3rd in Week 5 |
| Chris Park | 20 | Newcastle upon Tyne | Eliminated 4th in Week 7 |
| Jamie Shaw | 17 | Cardiff | Qualified |
| Anton Gordon | 19 | North London | Qualified |
| Daniel Pearce | 24 | Ashford | Qualified |
| Matthew "Matt" Johnson | 17 | North Wales | Qualified |
| Keith Semple | 21 | Larne | Qualified |

=== Final 10 Girls ===
| Finalist | Age* | From | Status |
|---|---|---|---|
| Lynsey Brown | 19 | Salford | Eliminated 1st in Week 2 |
| Emma Beard | 19 | Northampton | Eliminated 2nd and 3rd in Week 4 |
| Chloe Staines | 18 | Chelmsford | Eliminated 2nd and 3rd in Week 4 |
| Aimee Kearsley | 16 | Southport | Eliminated 4th in Week 6 |
| Javine Hylton | 20 | Ladbroke Grove | Eliminated 5th in Week 8 |
| Sarah Harding | 20 | Stockport | Qualified |
| Kimberley Walsh | 20 | Bradford | Qualified |
| Nadine Coyle | 17 | Derry | Qualified |
| Nicola Roberts | 17 | Runcorn | Qualified |
| Cheryl Tweedy | 19 | Newcastle upon Tyne | Qualified |

* as of week 1 (boys) and week 2 (girls)

== Live shows ==
=== Results summary ===
Colour key

| – | Contestant was in the bottom two but was declared safe. |
| – | Contestant was in the bottom three but was declared safe. |
| – | Contestant was in the bottom four but was declared safe. |
| – | Contestant was eliminated. |
| – | Contestant withdrew from the competition. |
| – | Contestant qualified for One True Voice or Girls Aloud. |

Boys

Weekly results per contestant
| Contestant | Week 1 | Week 3 | Week 5 | Week 7 (Final) |
|---|---|---|---|---|
| Keith Semple | Safe | Safe | Safe | Qualified |
| Matt Johnson | Safe | Safe | Bottom two | Qualified |
| Daniel Pearce | Safe | Safe | Safe | Qualified |
| Anton Gordon | Safe | Safe | Bottom three | Qualified |
| Jamie Shaw | Bottom three | Safe | Safe | Bottom two - Qualified |
| Chris Park | Bottom two | Bottom two | Safe | Eliminated |
| Mikey Green | Safe | Safe | Eliminated | Eliminated (week 5) |
| Nikk Mager | Safe | Eliminated | Eliminated (week 3) | |
| Peter Smith | Safe | Withdrew (week 3) | | |
| Andrew Kinlochan | Eliminated | Eliminated (week 1) | | |

Girls

Weekly results per contestant
| Contestant | Week 2 | Week 4 | Week 6 | Week 8 (Final) |
|---|---|---|---|---|
| Cheryl Tweedy | Safe | Bottom four | Bottom two | Qualified |
| Nicola Roberts | Safe | Safe | Safe | Qualified |
| Nadine Coyle | Safe | Safe | Safe | Qualified |
| Kimberley Walsh | Bottom three | Bottom four | Bottom four | Qualified |
| Sarah Harding | Safe | Safe | Bottom four | Bottom two - Qualified |
| Javine Hylton | Safe | Safe | Safe | Eliminated |
| Aimee Kearsley | Safe | Safe | Eliminated | Eliminated (week 6) |
| Chloe Staines | Safe | Eliminated | Eliminated (week 4) | |
| Emma Beard | Bottom two | Eliminated | Eliminated (week 4) | |
| Lynsey Brown | Eliminated | Eliminated (week 2) | | |
| Eliminated | Lynsey Brown; Fewest votes to save | Emma Beard; Fewest votes to save | Aimee Kearsley; Fewest votes to save | Javine Hylton; Fewest votes to qualify for the band |
| Eliminated | Lynsey Brown; Fewest votes to save | Chloe Staines; Fewest votes to save | Aimee Kearsley; Fewest votes to save | Javine Hylton; Fewest votes to qualify for the band |

=== Live show details ===
The live shows took on a format where the girls and boys performed on alternate weeks. After the performances had ended the public voted via telephone or the red button to save their favourite act. The live shows were broadcast in two parts, with the performances in the first episode and the results in the second. In the initial episodes, the three contestants with the lowest number of votes made up a bottom three. One was immediately told they were safe and the other two had a nervous wait before one was saved and the other left the competition. In weeks 3 and 4, two contestants were eliminated from each category. The person who was knocked out had to sing again at the end of the show after seeing a montage of their competition journey.

In the final, the six remaining male and female singers performed. Five of the boys formed One True Voice and five of the girls formed Girls Aloud.

The first live show was broadcast on ITV on 12 October 2002. The live final took place over two weeks, a couple of weeks before Christmas on 23 November for the boys and 30 November for the girls.

==== Week 1 (12 October 2002) ====
Category performing: Boys

Boys' performances on the first live show
| Artist | Order | Song (Original artist) | Results |
|---|---|---|---|
| Keith Semple | 1 | "Reach Out I'll Be There" (Four Tops) | Safe |
| Chris Park | 2 | "More Than a Woman"(The Bee Gees) | Bottom two |
| Jamie Shaw | 3 | "When You're in Love with a Beautiful Woman" (Dr. Hook) | Bottom three |
| Daniel Pearce | 4 | "Against All Odds" (Phil Collins) | Safe |
| Andrew Kinlochan | 5 | "Hard to Say I'm Sorry" (Chicago) | Eliminated |
| Anton Gordon | 6 | "Same Old Song" (Four Tops) | Safe |
| Matt Johnson | 7 | "Amazed" (Lonestar) | Safe |
| Nikk Mager | 8 | "A Little Bit More" (911) | Safe |
| Peter Smith | 9 | "Since I Don't Have You" (The Skyliners) | Safe |
| Mikey Green | 10 | "Drive" (The Cars) | Safe |

Bottom three: Jamie Shaw, Chris Park and Andrew Kinlochan received the lowest number of votes and ended up in the bottom three. Jamie was told that he was safe, leaving Andrew and Chris in the bottom two. Andrew was eliminated.

==== Week 2 (19 October 2002) ====
Category performing: Girls

Girls' performances on the second live show
| Artist | Order | Song (Original Artist) | Results |
|---|---|---|---|
| Sarah Harding | 1 | "Build Me Up Buttercup" (The Foundations) | Safe |
| Kimberley Walsh | 2 | "Baby Can I Hold You" (Tracy Chapman) | Bottom three |
| Chloe Staines | 3 | "Where Do Broken Hearts Go" (Whitney Houston) | Safe |
| Nicola Roberts | 4 | "River Deep Mountain High" (Tina Turner) | Safe |
| Aimee Kearsley | 5 | "Never Had a Dream Come True" (S Club 7) | Safe |
| Nadine Coyle | 6 | "Show Me Heaven" (Maria McKee) | Safe |
| Cheryl Tweedy | 7 | "Baby Now That I've Found You" (The Foundations) | Safe |
| Lynsey Brown | 8 | "All Around the World" (Lisa Stansfield) | Eliminated |
| Emma Beard | 9 | "You Might Need Somebody" (Randy Crawford) | Bottom two |
| Javine Hylton | 10 | "(You Make Me Feel Like) A Natural Woman" (Aretha Franklin) | Safe |

Bottom three: Emma Beard, Kimberley Walsh and Lynsey Brown received the lowest number of votes and ended up in the bottom three. Kimberley was told that she was safe, leaving Lynsey and Emma in the bottom two. Lynsey was eliminated.

==== Week 3 (26 October 2002) ====
Category performing: Boys

Boys' performances on the third live show
| Artist | Order | Song (Original artist) | Results |
|---|---|---|---|
| Daniel Pearce | 1 | "Celebration" (Kool & the Gang) | Safe |
| Matt Johnson | 2 | "Everything I Own" (Bread) | Safe |
| Nikk Mager | 3 | "Will You Still Love Me Tomorrow" (Carole King) | Eliminated |
| Keith Semple | 4 | "Over My Shoulder" (Mike and the Mechanics) | Safe |
| Anton Gordon | 5 | "Cherish" (Kool & the Gang) | Safe |
| Jamie Shaw | 6 | "I Only Have Eyes for You" (Art Garfunkel) | Safe |
| Chris Park | 7 | "You Take My Breath Away" (Rex Smith) | Bottom two |
| Peter Smith | 8 | "I Just Called to Say I Love You" (Stevie Wonder) | Withdrew* |
| Mikey Green | 9 | "I Want You Back" (Jackson 5) | Safe |

*Note: Two of the male contestants were due to be eliminated via the public vote in this show. However, during the results show, Peter Smith announced that he was too old to be involved in the competition and left the show. This meant that only one of the singers would be voted out by the television audience.

Bottom two: Chris Park and Nikk Mager received the lowest number of votes and ended up in the bottom two. Nikk was eliminated.

==== Week 4 (2 November 2002) ====
Category performing: Girls

Girls' performances on the fourth live show
| Artist | Order | Song (Original artist) | Results |
|---|---|---|---|
| Javine Hylton | 1 | "Let's Stay Together" (Al Green) | Safe |
| Cheryl Tweedy | 2 | "You're Still the One" (Shania Twain) | Bottom four |
| Emma Beard | 3 | "Be My Baby" (The Ronettes) | Eliminated |
| Chloe Staines | 4 | "Rescue Me" (Fontella Bass) | Eliminated |
| Nicola Roberts | 5 | "Shout" (Lulu) | Safe |
| Aimee Kearsley | 6 | "I Only Want to Be with You" (Dusty Springfield) | Safe |
| Kimberley Walsh | 7 | "Un-Break My Heart" (Toni Braxton) | Bottom four |
| Sarah Harding | 8 | "Anyone Who Had a Heart" (Dionne Warwick) | Safe |
| Nadine Coyle | 9 | "Fields of Gold" (Sting) | Safe |

Bottom four: The girls were split into two groups and were told that one girl would be eliminated from each group. From group one, Cheryl Tweedy and Emma Beard received the lowest number of votes and ended up in the bottom two. Emma was eliminated. From group two, Chloe Staines and Kimberley Walsh received the lowest number of votes and ended up in the bottom two. Chloe was eliminated.

==== Week 5 (9 November 2002) ====
Category performing: Boys

Boys' performances on the fifth live show
| Artist | Order | Song (Original artist) | Results |
|---|---|---|---|
| Matt Johnson | 1 | "Pray" (Take That) | Bottom two |
| Mikey Green | 2 | "Hello" (Lionel Richie) | Eliminated |
| Daniel Pearce | 3 | "For Once in My Life" (Stevie Wonder) | Safe |
| Keith Semple | 4 | "Sorry Seems to Be the Hardest Word" (Elton John) | Safe |
| Anton Gordon | 5 | "You Can't Hurry Love" (Phil Collins) | Bottom three |
| Chris Park | 6 | "If You Don't Know Me By Now" (Simply Red) | Safe |
| Jamie Shaw | 7 | "Working My Way Back to You" (The Four Seasons) | Safe |

Bottom three: Anton Gordon, Matt Johnson and Mikey Green received the lowest number of votes and ended up in the bottom three. Anton was told that he was safe, leaving Matt and Mikey in the bottom two. Mikey was eliminated.

==== Week 6 (16 November 2002) ====
Category performing: Girls

Girls' performances on the sixth live show
| Artist | Order | Song (Original artist) | Results |
|---|---|---|---|
| Nadine Coyle | 1 | "When I Fall in Love" (Doris Day) | Safe |
| Kimberley Walsh | 2 | "Emotion" (Samantha Sang) | Bottom four |
| Nicola Roberts | 3 | "Wind Beneath My Wings" (Bette Midler) | Safe |
| Aimee Kearsley | 4 | "You Keep Me Hanging On" (The Supremes) | Eliminated |
| Sarah Harding | 5 | "I'll Be There" (Jackson 5) | Bottom four |
| Cheryl Tweedy | 6 | "Nothing Compares 2 U" (Sinéad O'Connor) | Bottom two |
| Javine Hylton | 7 | "End of the Road" (Boyz II Men) | Safe |

Bottom four: Aimee Kearsley, Cheryl Tweedy, Kimberley Walsh and Sarah Harding received the lowest number of votes and ended up in the bottom four. Sarah and Kimberley were told that they were safe, leaving Aimee and Cheryl in the bottom two. Aimee was eliminated.

==== Week 7 – Boys final (23 November 2002) ====
Boys' performances on the seventh live show
| Artist | Order | Song (Original artist) | Results |
|---|---|---|---|
| Matt Johnson | 1 | "I'll Be There for You" (The Rembrandts) | Qualified |
| Daniel Pearce | 2 | "Candle in the Wind" (Elton John) | Qualified |
| Chris Park | 3 | "With a Little Help from My Friends" (The Beatles) | Eliminated |
| Anton Gordon | 4 | "I Believe I Can Fly" (R.Kelly) | Qualified |
| Keith Semple | 5 | "You Are So Beautiful" (Joe Cocker) | Qualified |
| Jamie Shaw | 6 | "Everybody Hurts" (R.E.M) | Bottom two - qualified |

Results: Keith Semple was announced as the first member of the band, followed by Matt Johnson, Daniel Pearce and Anton Gordon, leaving Chris Park and Jamie Shaw as the bottom two. Davina revealed that Jamie was the final member of the band, and Chris was eliminated.

==== Week 8 – Girls final (30 November 2002) ====
Girls' performances on the eighth live show
| Artist | Order | Song (Original artist) | Results |
|---|---|---|---|
| Sarah Harding | 1 | "Holding Out for a Hero" (Bonnie Tyler) | Bottom two - Qualified |
| Nadine Coyle | 2 | "I Wanna Dance with Somebody (Who Loves Me)" (Whitney Houston) | Qualified |
| Kimberley Walsh | 3 | "Chain Reaction" (Diana Ross) | Qualified |
| Nicola Roberts | 4 | "I'm So Excited" (The Pointer Sisters) | Qualified |
| Javine Hylton | 5 | "I'm Every Woman" (Chaka Khan) | Eliminated |
| Cheryl Tweedy | 6 | "Right Here Waiting" (Richard Marx) | Qualified |

Results: Cheryl Tweedy was announced as the first member of the band, followed by Nicola Roberts, Nadine Coyle and Kimberley Walsh, leaving Javine Hylton and Sarah Harding as the bottom two. Davina revealed that Sarah was the final member of the band, and Javine was eliminated.

== Winners' singles ==
=== Battle for Christmas Number One ===
After the two bands had been formed, three further episodes were broadcast as the two rival bands battled it out for the coveted Christmas Number One. On 7 December 2002, a live show featured both bands premiering their debut singles. One True Voice released the double A-side "Sacred Trust/After You're Gone", whilst Girls Aloud released "Sound of the Underground" as their song. On 14 December, a pre-recorded episode was aired, going behind the scenes of both band's first official few weeks together, filming their music videos and undergoing a nationwide tour of TV and radio stations to promote their singles.

=== The Christmas No. 1 Showdown ===
On 22 December 2002, the final episode of series, entitled The Christmas No. 1 Showdown, was a live show to reveal which of the two groups (if either) had made it to number one in the UK Singles Chart.

The show linked up with Neil Fox at the Pepsi Chart Show studios around halfway through the programme, where he ran down the top 10 singles before revealing the act that had charted highest. Girls Aloud were the lucky ones, reaching number one with first week sales of around 213,000. One True Voice went straight in at number two having sold close to 137,000 copies, while another Popstars: The Rivals act, The Cheeky Girls charted at number three. "Sound of the Underground" remained at number one for four weeks in total, stretching into 2003. The girls performed their new single live together for the second time shortly after it had been announced that they had reached number one.

The show also featured special performances from both The Cheeky Girls and from Hazel Kaneswaran, who had to leave the competition before the live shows after she was over the age limit. One True Voice and Girls Aloud also sang a special group version of "Winter Wonderland" and closed the series with a group performance of "White Christmas", joined at the climax by all of the contestants who had participated in the live shows.

== Post Popstars: The Rivals ==
=== Winners ===
==== Girls Aloud ====
After the success of their first single "Sound of the Underground", Girls Aloud spent five months recording the follow-up single and their debut album. Sound of the Underground was released in May 2003, reaching number two on the UK Albums Chart. Over the next five years, Girls Aloud released four additional studio albums and a greatest hits collection – What Will the Neighbours Say? (2004), Chemistry (2005), The Sound of Girls Aloud: The Greatest Hits (2006), Tangled Up (2007), and Out of Control (2008). All of their albums have been certified platinum, while The Sound of Girls Aloud has sold over a million copies. Their albums have produced 20 consecutive UK top ten singles, including four number ones. Girls Aloud have been nominated for four BRIT Awards, winning Best Single in 2009 for "The Promise".

In 2009, Girls Aloud took a hiatus to explore solo endeavours. Cheryl Tweedy became Cheryl and proceeded to release four studio albums – 3 Words (2009), Messy Little Raindrops (2010), A Million Lights (2012) and Only Human (2014), which reached number-one, number-one, number-two, and number-seven, respectively. Collectively, the albums included ten singles, five of which – "Fight for This Love", "Promise This", "Call My Name", "Crazy Stupid Love" and "I Don't Care" – reached the top position on the UK Singles Chart. Cheryl became the first British female solo artist to have five number-one singles in the UK, and held the record for the British female solo artist with the most UK number-one singles until 2018.

Nadine Coyle and Nicola Roberts also released solo material. Coyle released her debut album Insatiable through a partnership with Tesco in November 2010, while Roberts released Cinderella's Eyes in 2011. Both albums failed to make a major impact on the charts. Coyle later took part in the nineteenth series of I'm a Celebrity...Get Me Out of Here! in 2019, being the eighth contestant to be voted out. Consequently, Roberts now writes for friend and former bandmate, Cheryl. Roberts also created Dainty Doll, a make-up range aimed at fair-skinned individuals like herself. She has become vocal in her support of laws preventing minors from using sunbeds, in addition to highlighting the dangers of tanning in a BBC Three documentary Nicola Roberts: The Truth About Tanning. In 2010, she filmed a guest appearance on Britain's Next Top Model. She continued her television work by appearing as a judge on the Rihanna-produced series Styled to Rock in 2012. In 2020, Roberts took part in the first series of the UK version of The Masked Singer, which she won as "Queen Bee". In August 2020, Roberts performed The Captive's Hymn at a VJ Day concert at Horse Guards Parade, London.

Sarah Harding and Kimberley Walsh both turned their attention to acting and modeling during the hiatus. Following an appearance in the BBC television film Freefall, Harding had a starring role in the film St. Trinian's 2: The Legend of Fritton's Gold, Harding recorded three solo songs for the soundtrack. Harding also modelled for Ultimo lingerie and presented Sky Living reality TV show 'Dating in the Dark' for a time. In 2011, Harding went to rehab for alcohol and prescription drug abuse. She also appeared in the ITV soap Coronation Street in 2015 for a guest stint of five episodes, as well as taking part in the BBC gymnastics show Tumble in 2014, finishing as runner-up, and also participated in the Channel 4 winter sports show The Jump in 2016, where she was forced to withdraw after four weeks due to injury. Harding also took part in Celebrity Big Brother in August 2017, which she won. Meanwhile, Walsh co-hosted Viva's Suck My Pop and presented coverage of the 63rd British Academy Film Awards for MTV. Musically, Walsh has featured on Aggro Santos's "Like U Like". In 2012 Walsh made her West End theatre debut, playing Princess Fiona in the London production of Shrek the Musical. Walsh has also modelled for the fashion chain New Look, Schwarzkopf hair products, and Puma AG. In 2012, Walsh took part in series ten of Strictly Come Dancing, finishing as runner-up to Louis Smith.

In 2012, after a three-year hiatus, Girls Aloud reunited to celebrate their tenth anniversary as a band. They released the single "Something New", which donated proceeds to Children in Need, and the greatest hits anthology Ten. In 2013, the group embarked on Ten - The Hits Tour 2013. This was the band's final tour before they permanently went their separate ways, announcing their split online just moments after their final show of the tour in Liverpool.

Sarah Harding was diagnosed with advanced breast cancer in August 2020, and revealed in March 2021 that her prognosis was terminal and that she would not see another Christmas. Harding died on 5 September 2021, aged 39. In July 2022, the rest of the band came back together to participate in a 5 km Race for Life event in her memory at Hyde Park in London. Cheryl, Roberts and Coyle took part in person, with Walsh taking part remotely.

In November 2023, Girls Aloud announced they were to reunite for a new arena tour entitled, The Girls Aloud Show, in May and June 2024, which is billed as a celebration of both their music and their late bandmate Harding.

==== One True Voice ====
One True Voice, the winning male group, had a very different level of success. After the disappointment of missing out on the top spot with their debut single and despite the Popstars: The Rivals joint tour with Girls Aloud being cancelled due to poor sales, they released a further single entitled "Shakespeare's (Way With) Words" which only just reached the top 10 in the summer of 2003. Daniel Pearce quit the group at the beginning of June 2003 and, despite the band denying reports that the group was going to split, they broke up in August 2003. Pearce later went on to audition for the 2009 series of The X Factor, reaching the judges' houses stage before being eliminated. He has since gone onto to tour as a backing vocalist with Dizzee Rascal, performing with him at festivals and TV shows including Top of the Pops and Later... with Jools Holland, and in 2014, he also provided (uncredited) guest vocals on "Nobody to Love", which was a UK number one hit for the British dance production outfit Sigma, who he has also toured and performed with. Keith Semple moved to the United States and became the lead singer of Chicago-based rock band 7th Heaven. He auditioned for the ninth season of American Idol, but lost his "golden ticket" place due to his legal status and residency considerations. Years later, Semple auditioned for the ninth season of The Voice, and landed a spot on Adam Levine's team, making it to the live shows.

=== Other contestants ===
A number of the contestants who failed to make it into One True Voice or Girls Aloud have managed to achieve some level of success outside of the show. The five boys who did not make it into One True Voice formed the group Phixx after being given a £500,000 record deal with independent record label Concept Records, the label of Popstars rejects Liberty X. Four of the five girls who failed to qualify for Girls Aloud created CLEA (the name comes from each girl's initials). Javine Hylton decided to pursue a career as a solo artist, with a debut single Real Things reaching the top 10 in the United Kingdom. She was also chosen to represent the United Kingdom at the Eurovision Song Contest 2005, where she performed a song called "Touch My Fire".

Two girls from Romania who did not make it past the auditions, identical twins Monica and Gabriela Irimia, were given a record deal to release songs as The Cheeky Girls. They charted one place behind One True Voice in the 2002 Christmas countdown with "The Cheeky Song (Touch My Bum)" and released an album entitled PartyTime. They went on to release several more singles, including "Take Your Shoes Off" and "Hooray Hooray It's a Cheeky Holiday".

When CLEA disbanded, members Aimee Kearsley and Emma Beard formed a group named LoveShy and attempted to be the British entry for the 2008 Eurovision Song Contest but were knocked out by another girl group, The Revelations. Former Phixx member Nikk Mager auditioned for The X Factor in 2008, in front of Cheryl from Girls Aloud. He failed to advance through the audition stages. Stephanie McMichael, a contestant who pretended she was 16 but then revealed she was 13, later went on and appeared as a contestant on Big Brother 9 in 2008. She was the first to be evicted, and later released a single called "Camera Shy", and went on to audition for the ninth series of The X Factor in 2012 as part of the duo "Poisonous Twin".

== Reception ==
=== Ratings ===
| Episode | Air date | Official ITV1 rating | Weekly rank |
|---|---|---|---|
| Auditions 1 | 7 September | 7.66 | 19 |
| Auditions 2 | 14 September | 7.63 | 13 |
| The Final 100 | 21 September | 6.88 | 15 |
| The Final 50 | 28 September | 7.00 | 14 |
| The Final 10 Revealed (Boys) | 5 October | 7.76 | 12 |
| The Final 10 Revealed (Girls) | 5 October | 6.47 | 17 |
| Special Edition | 6 October | 5.27 | 24 |
| Live show 1 (Boys Final 10) | 12 October | 6.64 | 16 |
| Live results 1 | 12 October | Under 4.39 | Outside Top 30 |
| Live show 2 (Girls Final 10) | 19 October | 7.24 | 16 |
| Live results 2 | 19 October | Under 4.68 | Outside Top 30 |
| Live show 3 (Boys Final 9) | 26 October | 7.44 | 15 |
| Live results 3 | 26 October | 7.41 | 16 |
| Live show 4 (Girls Final 9) | 2 November | 7.16 | 15 |
| Live results 4 | 2 November | 6.83 | 19 |
| Live show 5 (Boys Final 7) | 9 November | 6.88 | 19 |
| Live results 5 | 9 November | Under 4.87 | Outside Top 30 |
| Live show 6 (Girls Final 7) | 16 November | 7.30 | 17 |
| Live results 6 | 16 November | Under 4.58 | Outside Top 30 |
| Live show 7 (Boys Final 6) | 23 November | 7.18 | 16 |
| Live results 7 (Boys Band Reveal) | 23 November | 8.90 | 10 |
| Live show 8 (Girls Final 6) | 30 November | 7.29 | 14 |
| Live results 8 (Girls Band Reveal) | 30 November | 8.54 | 10 |
| The Two Bands Launch | 7 December | 7.20 | 16 |
| Behind the Scenes of The Two Bands | 14 December | 5.43 | 24 |
| The Christmas No. 1 Showdown | 22 December | 6.01 | 20 |

=== Controversy and criticism ===
As well as contestants being forced out for being over and under the age limit, ITV was met with controversy amid claims that the voting had been rigged in the girls final. London radio station Capital FM received complaints from viewers during their news bulletin, but Red Fig, the company who handled the voting, denied the viewers claims. A spokesman for the show also said they were "satisfied" with the procedure.

== Sponsorship ==
McDonald's sponsored the show in a £4 million deal which covered the programmes on ITV and ITV2 and the official website. The sponsorship provided promotion for the show nationwide in McDonald's restaurants whilst the sponsorship bumpers during the programmes centred on a fictional puppet band called "The Happy Hyenas". Martin Strowde, the sponsorship director at Granada Television said "We're delighted that McDonald's has teamed up with us for what promises to be the most exciting hit this autumn".

== See also ==
- Popstars (UK)
- Pop Idol
- Fame Academy
- The X Factor (UK)
- Popstars (UK) discography

== Notes ==
- ^{A} Peter Smith left the competition in week 4 after admitting that he lied about his age. As a result, there was no bottom 3.
