= One True Voice =

2002–2003 British boy band

- Origin: United Kingdom
- Genres: Pop
- Years active: 2002–2003
- Past members: Anton Gordon; Matt Johnson; Daniel Pearce; Keith Semple; Jamie Shaw

One True Voice were a British boy band created on the ITV television series Popstars: The Rivals.

== Popstars: The Rivals ==
In the show, single gender pop groups were created through a public vote and competed on the UK Singles Chart for the 2002 Christmas number one single. One True Voice's debut single was the double A-side "Sacred Trust / After You're Gone" which competed against girl group Girls Aloud and their debut song "Sound of the Underground". Upon release, Girls Aloud topped the chart and One True Voice reached number two.

=== After Popstars: The Rivals ===
In June 2003, Daniel Pearce left the group to pursue a solo career. The band released a further single in 2003 but cancelled a tour due to poor ticket sales, topping a poll for "Britain's Worst Group". By August 2003, they had fully disbanded without releasing an album.

== Members ==
- Anton Gordon auditioned for The X Factor in 2006, but did not make it through the preliminary screening. He continues with musical projects under the name of Anton Romero, including a joint single with Winta entitled "Hot Romance (Rok with You)".
- Matt Johnson signed a solo contract with Jive Records after One True Voice, but left the label after being unhappy with the music direction and is currently signed to his own record label Tristar Records which has a distribution deal with Believe Digital since 2013. He released the single "Get Over You" on 29 July 2016, produced by Steve Power.
- Daniel Pearce (born 29 May 1978, 46 years old) played a lead role in the musical Jailhouse Rock in London's West End. Pearce auditioned for the 6th series of The X Factor in 2009, by singing Seal's "Kiss from a Rose". He made it through the auditions, boot camp (singing Prince's "Purple Rain") and eventually made it to Judges' Houses (singing George Michael's "Praying for Time"). His mentor Simon Cowell, however, did not choose him for the finals. He was a backing singer for Dizzee Rascal when he performed on Jools Holland's 2009/2010 Hootenanny and also on Top of the Pops in 2009 when he sang on the track "Holiday". He continues to be a backing singer for Dizzee Rascal and appeared on his No. 1 hit "Dirtee Disco".
- Keith Semple (born 20 September 1981, 43 years old) initially reformed his pre-OTV band, the Keith Semple Band, then fronted the band Alibi. After moving to Chicago, he performed with the band 7th Heaven between 2006 and 2012. In 2010, he successfully auditioned for the ninth season of American Idol, singing "Heaven" by Bryan Adams. But due to immigration status problems, he lost his spot on the program due to US legal status and residency considerations. In 2013, he launched his own new band SEMPLE focusing on his original music and in 2015 appeared in season 9 of the American series The Voice as part of Team Adam. In the Battle Round, Semple paired against Manny Cabo. In the Knockout Round, Semple paired against Dustin Christensen.
- Jamie Shaw (12 February 1985, 39 years old) continued to produce music. On 28 April 2006, he released his solo single "Different" through Rockin' Nation Music. In the UK, he supported the Backstreet Boys for some of their live dates. In May 2006, he was on tour in Germany and Austria with boyband US5 for 18 shows. He moved from music into television and has worked for the BBC since 2014. He currently works as Executive Publicity Assistant on works in Cardiff on the BBC programmes Doctor Who and its spin-off Class.

== Discography ==
=== Singles ===
Year	Single	Peak chart positions		Certifications (sales threshold)	Album
Year	Single	UK	IRE	Certifications (sales threshold)	Album
2002	"Sacred Trust / After You're Gone"	2	9	UK: Gold	Non-album singles
2003	"Shakespeare's (Way with) Words"	10	39		Non-album singles

== Media ==
A Sky One documentary One True Voice: Pop Go the Rivals? followed the group on their 2003 publicity tour, and their search for a paid manager to replace Pete Waterman, inherited from the television competition.
