= Skepta discography =

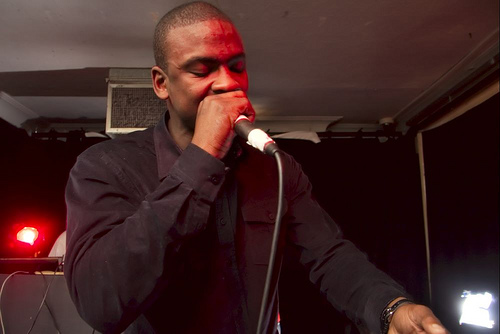
- Studio albums: 6
- Extended plays: 3
- Singles: 28
- Mixtapes: 4

The following is a discography of Skepta, a British MC from Tottenham, London. He is a producer and DJ commonly associated with the North London grime scene, including Roll Deep and Boy Better Know. Skepta released his debut album Greatest Hits on 17 September 2007. It was released on the Boy Better Know label. Skepta self-released the first single "Rolex Sweep" in September 2008, which reached number 89 on the UK Singles Chart. He released the album Microphone Champion on 1 June 2009. The single "Too Many Man", with Jme, Wiley, Frisco and Shorty, charted at number 79.

Skepta has released five singles off his third studio album Doin' It Again (first with a major label): "Bad Boy", "Rescue Me", "Cross My Heart" featuring Preeya Kalidas, "So Alive" and "Amnesia", as well as a video for "Hello Good Morning" (Grime Remix). Three singles reached the Top 40 of the UK Singles Chart, with "Rescue Me" being the most successful at number 14. "Cross My Heart" came in at number 31 and dropped out of the Top 40 a week later. Doin' it Again spent three weeks in the top 100 album charts and debuted and peaked at number 19 on its first week of release. In 2012, Skepta released two singles from his forthcoming fourth album.

Skepta's second major label album, The Honeymoon, was intended to be released in the fourth quarter of 2011, but was delayed until 2012. After a disappointing response from the first two singles Skepta decided to release a purchasable mixtape, titled Blacklisted. This was released on 2 December 2012 along with music videos to support the release. In March 2014, Skepta provided a verse for the remix of "German Whip" by Meridian Dan. In the same month, he debuted his new single, "That's Not Me", featuring his brother, Jme. Released on 8 June 2014, the song peaked at number 21 on the UK Singles Chart.

== Albums ==
=== Studio albums ===
List of studio albums, with selected details and chart positions
Title	Details	Peak chart positions										Certifications
Title	Details	UK	AUS	BEL (Fl)	CAN	IRE	NL	NZ	SWE	SWI	US	Certifications
Greatest Hits	Released: 17 September 2007; Label: Boy Better Know; Formats: CD, digital download	—	—	—	—	—	—	—	—	—	—	
Microphone Champion	Released: 1 June 2009; Label: Boy Better Know; Formats: CD, digital download	103	—	—	—	—	—	—	—	—	—	
Doin' It Again	Released: 31 January 2011; Label: AATW, Universal Island; Formats: CD, digital download	19	—	—	—	—	—	—	—	—	—	BPI: Silver
Konnichiwa	Released: 6 May 2016; Label: Boy Better Know; Formats: CD, LP, digital download	2	13	68	51	13	31	27	54	38	160	BPI: Gold
Ignorance Is Bliss	Released: 31 May 2019; Label: Boy Better Know; Formats: CD, LP, digital download	2	15	17	67	6	14	23	—	26	—	BPI: Gold
The Fork and Knife	Released: 6 November 2026; Label: Big Smoke, Epic; Formats: CD, LP, digital download	4	—	127	—	32	—	12	—	46	—	
"—" denotes an album that did not chart or was not released in that territory.

=== Collaborative albums ===
List of collaborative albums, with selected details and chart positions
Title	Details	Peak chart positions					Certifications
Title	Details	UK	BEL (Fl)	IRE	NL	SWI	Certifications
Insomnia (with Chip and Young Adz)	Released: 27 March 2020; Label: SKC M29; Formats: CD, digital download, streaming	3	84	19	88	81	BPI: Silver

=== Mixtapes ===
List of mixtapes, with selected details
Title	Details	Peak chart positions	Certifications
Title	Details	UK	Certifications
Joseph Junior Adenuga	Released: 2006; Label: Self-released; Formats: Digital download	—	
Been There Done That	Released: 1 February 2010; Label: Boy Better Know; Formats: Digital download	—	
Community Payback	Released: 29 April 2011; Hosted by: DJ Whoo Kid; Label: Boy Better Know; Formats: Digital download	—	
Blacklisted	Released: 2 December 2012; Label: 3 Beat, AATW; Formats: CD, digital download	72	BPI: Silver
The Tim Westwood Mix	Released: 9 September 2015; Label: Boy Better Know; Formats: Digital download	—	
"—" denotes a mixtape that did not chart or was not released in that territory.

== EPs ==
List of extended plays, with selected details
Title	Details	Peak chart positions		
Title	Details	UK	BEL (Fl)	NZ
Vicious	Released: 31 October 2017; Label: Boy Better Know; Format: Digital download	—	—	—
All In	Released: 30 July 2021; Label: Boy Better Know; Format: Digital download, streaming	—	174	—
Skepta .. Fred (with Fred Again)	Released: 29 August 2025; Label: Epic; Format: Digital download, streaming	72	—	26
"—" denotes an EP that did not chart or was not released in that territory.

== Singles ==
=== As lead artist ===
Title	Year	Peak chart positions										Certifications	Album
Title	Year	UK	UK R&B	AUS	BEL Tip	CAN	IRE	NZ Hot	SWI	US	US R&B/ HH	Certifications	Album
"Rolex Sweep"	2008	86	—	—	—	—	—	—	—	—	—		Microphone Champion
"Sunglasses at Night"	2009	64	—	—	—	—	—	—	—	—	—		Microphone Champion
"Too Many Man" (with Wiley featuring Boy Better Know)	2009	79	—	—	—	—	—	—	—	—	—		Microphone Champion
"Lush" (featuring Jay Sean)	2009	—	—	—	—	—	—	—	—	—	—		Microphone Champion
"Bad Boy"	2010	26	8	—	—	—	—	—	—	—	—		Doin' It Again
"Rescue Me"	2010	14	6	—	—	—	—	—	—	—	—	BPI: Silver	Doin' It Again
"Cross My Heart" (featuring Preeya Kalidas)	2010	31	8	—	—	—	—	—	—	—	—		Doin' It Again
"So Alive" (vs. N-Dubz)	2011	99	26	—	—	—	—	—	—	—	—		Doin' It Again
"Amnesia"	2011	—	—	—	—	—	—	—	—	—	—		Doin' It Again
"Hold On"	2012	31	9	—	—	—	—	—	—	—	—		Non-album singles
"Make Peace Not War"	2012	29	8	—	—	—	—	—	—	—	—		Non-album singles
"That's Not Me" (featuring JME)	2014	21	—	—	—	—	—	—	—	—	—	BPI: 2× Platinum; RMNZ: Gold	Konnichiwa
"Shutdown"	2015	39	9	—	—	—	—	—	—	—	—	BPI: Platinum; RMNZ: Platinum	Konnichiwa
"Ladies Hit Squad" (featuring D Double E and ASAP Nast)	2016	89	28	—	—	—	—	—	—	—	—		Konnichiwa
"Man"	2016	34	7	—	—	—	—	—	—	—	—	BPI: Gold; RMNZ: Gold	Konnichiwa
"No Security"	2017	—	—	—	—	—	—	—	—	—	—	BPI: Silver	Vicious
"Hypocrisy"	2017	—	—	—	—	—	—	—	—	—	—		Vicious
"Ding-a-Ling" (with Stefflon Don)	2017	64	33	—	—	—	—	—	—	—	—		Hurtin' Me – The EP
"Pure Water"	2018	78	—	—	—	—	—	—	—	—	—		Ignorance Is Bliss
"Energy (Stay Far Away)" (with Wizkid)	2018	59	37	—	—	—	—	—	—	—	—	BPI: Platinum; RMNZ: Gold	Non-album singles
"Stay with It" (featuring Suspect & SHAILAN)	2018	—	—	—	—	—	—	—	—	—	—		Non-album singles
"Neighbourhood Watch" (featuring LD)	2018	—	—	—	—	—	—	—	—	—	—		Non-album singles
"The Answer" (with Daisy Maybe)	2018	—	—	—	—	—	—	—	—	—	—		Non-album singles
"Wish You Were Here"	2019	—	—	—	—	—	—	—	—	—	—		Non-album singles
"Bullet from a Gun"	2019	32	13	—	—	—	61	25	—	—	—	BPI: Silver	Ignorance Is Bliss
"Greaze Mode" (with Nafe Smallz)	2019	18	5	—	—	—	41	23	—	—	—	BPI: Platinum; ARIA: Gold; RMNZ: Gold	Ignorance Is Bliss
"Love Me Not" (featuring Cheb Rabi and B Live)	2019	—	24	—	—	—	—	—	—	—	—		Ignorance Is Bliss
"Kiss and Tell" (with AJ Tracey)	2019	31	—	—	—	—	53	33	—	—	—	BPI: Silver	Non-album singles
"Papi Chulo" (with Octavian)	2020	37	21	85	14	99	37	—	66	—	—	BPI: Gold; RMNZ: Platinum	Non-album singles
"Waze" (with Chip and Young Adz)	2020	18	10	—	—	—	71	—	—	—	—		Insomnia
"Show Out" (with Kid Cudi and Pop Smoke)	2020	37	7	—	—	42	29	5	—	54	12	BPI: Silver; RMNZ: Gold	Man on the Moon III: The Chosen
"Cancelled" (with Slowthai)	2021	39	22	—	—	—	—	—	—	—	—		Tyron
"Nirvana" (featuring J Balvin)	2021	38	13	—	—	—	85	13	—	—	—		All In
"Plugged In" (with Fumez the Engineer)	2021	93	—	—	—	—	—	—	—	—	—		Non-album singles
"Can't Play Myself (A Tribute to Amy)"	2023	28	—	—	—	—	87	21	—	—	—		Non-album singles
"Skeptacore Pt. 3" (with Ryder)	2023	88	—	—	—	—	83	37	—	—	—	BPI: Silver	Non-album singles
"Gas Me Up (Diligent)"	2024	32	10	—	—	—	90	9	—	—	—		The Fork and Knife
"Tony Montana" (with Portable and Jae5)	2024	—	—	—	—	—	—	23	—	—	—		Non-album singles
"Miss Independent" (with R2R Moe)	2024	—	—	—	—	—	—	30	—	—	—		Non-album singles
"Why Lie?" (with Flo Milli)	2024	74	—	—	—	—	—	13	—	—	—		Non-album singles
"Alpha Omega" (with Lex Luger)	2024	—	—	—	—	—	—	—	—	—	—		Non-album singles
"Cops & Robbers" (with Sammy Virji)	2025	36	—	—	—	—	—	7	—	—	—	BPI: Silver	Same Day Cleaning
"Victory Lap" (with Fred Again & PlaqueBoyMax)	2025	4	1	3	—	75	14	—	—	—	—	BPI: Platinum; ARIA: 2× Platinum; RMNZ: 2× Platinum	The Fork and Knife & USB
"Friendly Fire"	2025	—	—	—	—	—	—	—	—	—	—		Non-album singles
"Round 2"	2025	—	—	—	—	—	—	24	—	—	—		Non-album singles
"On the Low" (with Tiwa Savage)	2025	—	—	—	—	—	—	—	—	—	—		This One Is Personal
"Sirens (From Ireland)"	2025	66	21	—	—	—	75	14	—	—	—		Non-album single
"Outside" (with J Hus)	2025	86	14	—	—	—	—	—	—	—	—		Half Clip
"Innocent Smile" (featuring Suggs and Chase & Status)	2026	—	—	—	—	—	—	26	—	—	—		The Fork and Knife
"Danger Danger" (with Dom Dolla and Solomun)	2026	—	—	69	—	—	—	—	—	—	—		Non-album singles
"Chiltern Firehouse" (with Fakemink)	2026	—	—	—	—	—	—	18	—	—	—		Non-album singles
"Pandora's Box"	2026	—	—	—	—	—	—	—	—	—	—		The Fork and Knife
"—" denotes a single that did not chart or was not released in that territory.

=== As featured artist ===
Title	Year	Peak chart positions										Certifications	Album
Title	Year	UK	UK R&B	AUS	CAN	DEN	IRE	NZ	SWI	US	US R&B/ HH	Certifications	Album
"Get Busy" (Rude Kid featuring Skepta)	2012	—	—	—	—	—	—	—	—	—	—		Non-album single
"Can You Hear Me? (Ayayaya)" (Wiley featuring Skepta, JME & Ms D)	2012	3	—	—	—	—	26	—	—	—	—	BPI: Platinum	The Ascent
"Supposed to Do" (Ace Hood featuring Skepta)	2014	—	—	—	—	—	—	—	—	—	—		The Beast of the South
"Ojuelegeba (Remix)" (WizKid featuring Drake & Skepta)	2015	—	—	—	—	—	—	—	—	—	—		Non-album single
"Red Eye to Paris" (Flatbush Zombies featuring Skepta)	2015	—	—	—	—	—	—	—	—	—	—		RedEye to Paris
"50 Grand" (Devlin featuring Skepta)	2015	—	—	—	—	—	—	—	—	—	—		The Devil In
"I Win" (Lethal Bizzle featuring Skepta)	2017	—	—	—	—	—	—	—	—	—	—		You'll Never Make a Million from Grime
"2 Cars" (Esco featuring Skepta, D Double E & Chronik)	2017	—	—	—	—	—	—	—	—	—	—		Non-album singles
"Excuse Me" (CEONRPG featuring Skepta)	2017	—	—	—	—	—	—	—	—	—	—		Non-album singles
"Check It Out" (Remix) (Xavier Wulf featuring Skepta)	2018	—	—	—	—	—	—	—	—	—	—		Non-album singles
"One Way" (Suspect featuring Skepta & Jesse James Solomon)	2018	—	—	—	—	—	—	—	—	—	—		Still Loading
"Nang" (D Double E featuring Skepta)	2018	—	—	—	—	—	—	—	—	—	—		Jackuum
"Praise the Lord (Da Shine)" (A$AP Rocky featuring Skepta)	2018	18	8	33	16	22	30	11	14	45	22	BPI: 2× Platinum; ARIA: 2× Platinum; IFPI DEN: Gold; RIAA: 3× Platinum; RMNZ: 7× Platinum; SNEP: Gold	Testing
"Jumpy Remix" (Ambush Buzzworl featuring Skepta & Chip)	2018	81	—	—	—	—	—	—	—	—	—	BPI: Silver	Non-album single
"Money Right" (Dizzee Rascal featuring Skepta)	2018	68	—	—	—	—	—	—	—	—	—		Don't Gas Me
"Like to Party" (BOJ featuring Skepta & Teezee)	2018	—	—	—	—	—	—	—	—	—	—		Non-album singles
"Certy" (Double S featuring Skepta)	2019	—	—	—	—	—	—	—	—	—	—		Non-album singles
"Bet" (Octavian featuring Skepta & Michael Phantom)	2019	44	—	—	—	—	—	—	—	—	—	RMNZ: Gold	Endorphins
"Back to Basics" (Headie One featuring Skepta)	2019	42	27	—	—	—	—	—	—	—	—	BPI: Silver	Music x Road
"How Far?" (Gorillaz featuring Tony Allen & Skepta)	2020	—	—	—	—	—	—	—	—	—	—		Song Machine, Season One: Strange Timez (Deluxe edition)
"Dimension" (Jae5 featuring Skepta and Rema)	2021	58	38	—	—	—	—	—	—	—	—		Non-album singles
"London Tonight Freestyle" (Dean Blunt featuring Skepta, Novelist and ASAP Rocky)	2022	—	—	—	—	—	—	—	—	—	—		Non-album singles
"Gut Genug" (Remix) (KitschKrieg featuring Blumengarten and Skepta)	2026	—	—	—	—	—	—	—	—	—	—		Non-album singles
"—" denotes a single that did not chart or was not released in that territory.

=== Promotional singles ===
Title	Year	Peak chart positions		Certifications	Album
Title	Year	UK	UK R&B	Certifications	Album
"All Over the House" (featuring Shorty)	2011	—	—		Doing it Again
"Lay Her Down" (featuring Kano)	2013	—	—		Non-album single
"It Ain't Safe" (featuring Young Lord)	2014	102	32	BPI: Silver; RMNZ: Platinum	Konnichiwa
"—" denotes a single that did not chart or was not released in that territory.

== Other charted and certified songs ==
Title	Year	Peak chart positions			Certifications	Album
Title	Year	UK	UK R&B	NZ Hot	Certifications	Album
"I Spy" (featuring Jammer)	2007	—	—	—	BPI: Gold	Greatest Hits
"Ace Hood Flow"	2012	—	—	—	BPI: Silver	Blacklisted
"Konnichiwa"	2016	41	11	—	BPI: Silver	Konnichiwa
"Lyrics" (featuring Novelist)	2016	62	17	—		Konnichiwa
"Numbers" (featuring Pharrell Williams)	2016	69	19	—		Konnichiwa
"Corn on the Curb" (featuring Wiley and Chip)	2016	73	21	—		Konnichiwa
"Crime Riddim"	2016	88	25	—		Konnichiwa
"Detox"	2016	—	35	—		Konnichiwa
"Text Me Back"	2016	—	38	—		Konnichiwa
"Skepta Interlude" (Drake featuring Skepta)	2017	35	9	—		More Life
"Inglorious" (Slowthai featuring Skepta)	2019	50	—	—		Nothing Great About Britain
"Redrum" (featuring Key)	2019	—	20	27		Ignorance Is Bliss
"No Sleep"	2019	—	29	—		Ignorance Is Bliss
"What Do You Mean?" (featuring J Hus)	2019	14	3	24	BPI: Gold	Ignorance Is Bliss
"Going Through It"	2019	—	27	—		Ignorance Is Bliss
"Same Old Story"	2019	—	26	—		Ignorance Is Bliss
"Animal Instinct" (featuring Lancey Foux)	2019	—	38	—		Ignorance Is Bliss
"Glow in the Dark" (featuring Lay-Z & WizKid)	2019	—	33	—	BPI: Silver	Ignorance Is Bliss
"Gangsta" (featuring Boy Better Know)	2019	—	35	—		Ignorance Is Bliss
"Mains" (with Chip and Young Adz)	2020	32	—	—		Insomnia
"Demons" (with Chip and Young Adz featuring Dirtbike LB)	2020	47	—	—		Insomnia
"Lane Switcha" (with Pop Smoke featuring ASAP Rocky, Juicy J and Project Pat)	2021	—	—	9		F9 soundtrack
"Bellator"	2021	—	—	26		All In
"Peace of Mind" (featuring Teezee and Kid Cudi)	2021	—	—	29		All In
"Smoke in Your Eyes" (with Ossie featuring Harry Stone)	2023	—	—	26		NYE 2024 (DJ Mix)
"Toxic" (with Playboi Carti)	2025	21	—	—		Music
"Back 2 Back" (with Fred Again)	2025	54	—	5		Skepta .. Fred
"London" (with Fred Again)	2025	70	—	8		Skepta .. Fred
"Last 1s Left" (with Fred Again)	2025	—	—	11		Skepta .. Fred
"21 Years" (with Fred Again)	2025	—	—	12		Skepta .. Fred
"Secrets of Patriarchy"	2026	—	—	20		The Fork and Knife
"Cold Shower" (featuring Project Pat)	2026	—	—	25		The Fork and Knife
"Currency"	2026	50	11	14		The Fork and Knife
"Broken Hearts" (featuring Central Cee and Jorja Smith)	2026	54	15	10		The Fork and Knife
"—" denotes a song that did not chart or was not released in that territory.

== Guest appearances ==
List of guest appearances, with other performing artists, showing year released and album name
Title	Year	Artist(s)	Album
"Hospital"	2010	JME, Shorty, Frisco & Jammer	Blam!
"My Crew"	2012	Chip, DJ Drama	London Boy
"God Bless Me"	2015	Wiki, Sporting Life	Lil Me
"I Know There's Gonna Be (Good Times)" (Skepta Remix)	2015	Jamie xx, Popcaan, Frisco	Non-album remix
"Raving Tonight"	2016	Frisco, Wiley	System Killer
"See No Evil"	2016	Key!	Before I Scream!
"Back from the Dead"	2016	Riff Raff, DJ Afterthought	Balloween
"U Were Always, Pt. 2"	2016	Wiley	Godfather
"Put That on My Set"	2016	ASAP Mob, ASAP Rocky	Cozy Tapes Vol. 1: Friends
"Skepta Interlude"	2017	Drake	More Life
"Lean 4 Real"	2018	Playboi Carti	Die Lit
"Dyed 2wice"	2018	Lancey Foux	Pink II
"Inglorious"	2019	Slowthai	Nothing Great About Britain
"Welcome to the Party" (Remix)	2019	Pop Smoke	Meet the Woo (Deluxe)
"Dem Man Are Dead"	2019	JME	Grime MC
"Nang"	2019	JME	Grime MC
"Little Demon"	2019	Frank Ocean	Non-album remix
"Cancelled"	2021	Slowthai	Tyron
"IC3"	2021	Ghetts	Conflict of Interest
"WokStar"	2021	YSL Records, Strick	Slime Language 2 and Strick Land
"Ten"	2025	Central Cee	Can't Rush Greatness
"Toxic"	2025	Playboi Carti	Music
"Less Is More"	2025	PlaqueBoyMax, 5STAR	London

== Production discography ==
=== 2007 ===
Skepta – Greatest Hits

- 1. "The Journey"
- 2. "I'm There"
- 3. "Duppy (Doin' It Again)" (featuring Bearman, Bossman, Footsie, Jme, Jammer, MC Creed, Trim and Wiley)
- 4. "Listen Up"
- 9. "In a Corner" (featuring Flowdan and Trigga)
- 11. "Sweet Mother"
- 12. "Shape Shifting"
- 13. "Blood, Sweat and Tears" (featuring Jme and Shorty)
- 14. "Cold Turkey"

=== 2008 ===
Kano - 140 Grime St

- 5. "These MC's" (featuring Skepta)

=== 2014 ===
Wiley - Snakes & Ladders

- 2. "On a Level"

=== 2016 ===
Skepta - Konnichiwa

- 1. "Konnichiwa" (produced with Ragz Originale)
- 2. "Lyrics" (featuring Novelist)
- 3. "Corn on the Curb" (featuring Wiley and Chip)
- 5. "It Ain't Safe" (featuring Young Lord)
- 6. "Ladies Hit Squad" (featuring D Double E and ASAP Nast) (produced with Jason Adenuga)
- 7. "Numbers" (featuring Pharrell Williams) (produced with Pharrell Williams)
- 8. "Man"
- 9. "Shutdown" (produced with Ragz Originale)
- 10. "That's Not Me" (featuring Jme)

=== 2017 ===
Skepta - Vicious

- 1. "Still"
- 2. "Sit Down" (featuring Lil B)
- 4. "Worst" (featuring Smoke Boys)
- 5. "Hypocrisy"
- 6. "Ghost Ride" (featuring ASAP Nast and ASAP Rocky)

=== 2018 ===
ASAP Rocky - Testing

- 5. "Praise the Lord (Da Shine)" (featuring Skepta)

=== 2019 ===
Skepta - Ignorance Is Bliss

- 1. "Bullet from a Gun" (produced with Ragz Originale)
- 2. "Greaze Mode"
- 3. "Redrum" (featuring Key!)
- 4. "No Sleep"
- 5. "What Do You Mean?" (featuring J Hus) (produced with iO)
- 6. "Going Through It" (produced with IndigoChildRick)
- 7. "Same Old Story"
- 8. "Love Me Not" (featuring Cheb Rabi and B Live)
- 9. "Animal Instinct" (featuring Lancey Foux) (produced with Trench)
- 11. "You Wish"
- 12. "Gangsta" (featuring Boy Better Know)
- 13. "Pure Water"

=== 2020 ===
Skepta, Chip, and Young Adz - Insomnia

- 1. "Mains"
- 5. "St Tropez"

== DJ Mixes ==
- Rinse:04 (2008)
