= NME Awards 2017 =

2017 British awards ceremony

- Date: 15 February 2017
- City: London, England, United Kingdom
- Venue: Brixton Academy
- Host: Huw Stephens

The NME Awards 2017 were held in London, England, on 15 February 2017, at the Brixton Academy and was hosted by English comedian Huw Stephens. Beyoncé led the nominations with five, followed by the 1975, Bastille, Christine and the Queens and Skepta with four nominations each.

== Winners and nominees ==
=== Best British Band ===
- Wolf Alice
- The 1975
- Bastille
- Years & Years
- Biffy Clyro
- The Last Shadow Puppets

=== Best International Band ===
- Tame Impala
- Kings of Leon
- Green Day
- Metallica
- A Tribe Called Quest
- Tegan and Sara

=== Best British Female ===
- Dua Lipa
- Adele
- Charli XCX
- MIA
- Kae Tempest
- PJ Harvey

=== Best International Female ===
- Sia
- Lady Gaga
- Beyoncé
- Solange
- Christine and the Queens
- Tove Lo

=== Best International Male ===
- Kanye West
- Drake
- The Weeknd
- Frank Ocean
- Kendrick Lamar
- Chance the Rapper

=== Best British Male ===
- Skepta
- Zayn Malik
- Kano
- Jamie T
- Michael Kiwanuka
- Richard Ashcroft

=== Best New Artist ===
- Blossoms
- Zara Larsson
- Sunflower Bean
- Christine and the Queens
- Dua Lipa
- Anderson .Paak

=== Best Album ===
- Kanye West – The Life of Pablo
- Skepta – Konnichiwa
- The 1975 – I Like It When You Sleep, for You Are So Beautiful yet So Unaware of It
- Radiohead – A Moon Shaped Pool
- Bastille – Wild World
- Beyoncé – Lemonade

=== Best Track ===
- Tove Lo – "Cool Girl"
- Charli XCX – "After the Afterparty"
- Skepta – "Man"
- Bastille – "Good Grief"
- The 1975 – "Somebody Else"
- Christine and the Queens – "Tilted"

=== Best Live Band ===
- Bastille
- Slaves
- The 1975
- Bring Me the Horizon
- Christine and the Queens
- Wolf Alice

=== Best Video ===
- Kanye West – "Famous"
- Beyoncé – "Formation"
- Radiohead – "Burn the Witch"
- Slaves – "Consume or Be Consumed"
- Rat Boy – "Get Over It"
- Wolf Alice – "Lisbon"

=== Best TV Series ===
- Stranger Things
- Fleabag
- Game of Thrones
- Black Mirror
- HUM∀NS
- People Just Do Nothing

=== Best Festival ===
- Glastonbury
- Reading & Leeds Festivals
- Download Festival
- Isle of Wight Festival
- Primavera
- V Festival

=== Best Film ===
- Deadpool
- My Scientology Movie
- Captain America: Civil War
- Suicide Squad
- Everybody Wants Some!!
- Hunt for the Wilderpeople

=== Best Music Film ===
- Oasis: Supersonic
- Nick Cave and the Bad Seeds’ One More Time with Feeling
- Sing Street
- Gimme Danger
- The Rolling Stones: Havana Moon
- The Beatles: Eight Days a Week – The Touring Years

=== Music Moment of the Year ===
- Bring Me the Horizon invade Coldplay’s table at NME Awards 2016
- Coldplay’s Viola Beach tribute at Glastonbury
- Beyoncé drops Lemonade
- Skepta wins Mercury Prize
- Pete Doherty plays The Bataclan
- The Stone Roses’ first new music in 20 years

=== Best Re-issue ===
- REM – Out of Time
- Pink Floyd – Meddle
- Oasis – Be Here Now
- Michael Jackson – Off the Wall
- DJ Shadow – Endtroducing....
- Blur – Leisure

=== Best Book ===
- Alan Partridge – Nomad
- Johnny Marr – Set the Boy Free
- Bruce Springsteen – Born to Run
- The Killers – Somewhere Outside That Finish Line
- Zayn – Zayn: The Official Autobiography
- Sylvia Patterson – I'm Not with the Band

=== Hero of the Year ===
- David Bowie
- Adele
- Beyoncé
- Millie Bobby Brown
- Gary Lineker
- Liam Gallagher

=== Villain of the Year ===
- Donald Trump
- David Cameron
- Boris Johnson
- Nigel Farage
- Martin Shkreli
- Katie Hopkins

=== Worst Band ===
- The Chainsmokers
- Clean Bandit
- Honey G
- Nickelback
- 5 Seconds of Summer
- Twenty One Pilots

=== Best Small Festival ===
- Y Not
- Green Man
- End of the Road
- Festival No 6
- Kendall Calling
- Slam Dunk

=== Best Festival Headliner ===
- Coldplay
- Radiohead
- Biffy Clyro
- Adele
- Foals
- The Stone Roses

=== Outstanding Contribution to Music ===
- Pulp
