= Konnichiwa (Skepta album) =

Studio album by Skepta
- Released: 6 May 2016
- Recorded: 2013–2016
- Genres: Hip-hop; grime
- Length: 43:11
- Label: Boy Better Know
- Producers: Skepta; Blakie; Footsie; Jason Adenuga; Pharrell Williams; Ragz Originale

Skepta chronology
The Tim Westwood Mix (2015)	Konnichiwa (2016)	Vicious (2017)

Singles from Konnichiwa
- 1. "That's Not Me" Released: 8 June 2014; 2. "Shutdown" Released: 26 April 2015; 3. "Ladies Hit Squad" Released: 14 February 2016; 4. "Man" Released: 14 April 2016

Konnichiwa is the fourth studio album by British rapper Skepta. The title is the greeting "hello" in the Japanese language. After numerous delays, it was released on 6 May 2016 by Boy Better Know. Konnichiwa features guest appearances from Jme, Boy Better Know, D Double E, Novelist, Wiley, Chip, Pharrell Williams, ASAP Nast and Young Lord. Konnichiwa was executively produced by Skepta himself, who produced all but three songs on the album. Pharrell also worked on production with Skepta on the album.

Konnichiwa was originally announced in early 2013, yet suffered from numerous delays and reworking. In November 2014, Skepta stated that Konnichiwa was to be released in March 2015, however this release date was delayed once again. In April 2016, Skepta restarted the album campaign by announcing the finalised release date. The album was launched with a party in Tokyo on 5 May 2016 arranged and broadcast globally by live streaming platform Boiler Room.

Konnichiwa peaked at number two on the UK Albums Chart. The album also charted in Australia, Belgium, Netherlands, Ireland, New Zealand, Sweden, Switzerland and the United States. It was supported by four singles, including the top 40 entries "That's Not Me", "Shutdown" and "Man". Konnichiwa is certified Gold by the British Phonographic Industry (BPI). The album received acclaim from critics as well, who praised its role and success in the resurgence of grime music and its cultural identity.

It was included in numerous end-of-year lists for best albums of 2016 by many publications, including NME, The Guardian and Apple Music, who named the album as the best of 2016. Konnichiwa won the 2016 Mercury Prize.

== Background ==
In 2012, Skepta released two singles planned in promotion for his forthcoming fourth album – "Hold On" and "Make Peace Not War". Both were Top 40 charting singles in the UK but were a departure from Skepta's usual sound. Skepta's fourth album was intended to be released in the fourth quarter of 2011, entitled The Honeymoon, but was delayed till 2012. After a disappointing response from the first two singles Skepta decided to release a purchasable mixtape, titled Blacklisted. It was released on 2 December 2012 along with music videos to support the release prior to the release. The Honeymoon project was ultimately scrapped and replaced by the working title Konnichiwa, while also parting ways with his label 3 Beat and seeking the production and release of the album independently.

Konnichiwa was originally announced in early 2013, yet suffered from numerous delays and reworking. It was initially supported by the single "Lay Her Down" featuring Kano, along with a release date of late 2013. However, after announcing near-completion the single and release was scrapped and Skepta took another approach to the album campaign. It was announced by Skepta to be released in 2014, stating that he completed nine songs and required six more to be finished. In November 2014, Skepta stated that Konnichiwa was to be released in March 2015, however this release date was delayed once again. In April 2016, Skepta restarted the album campaign by announcing the finalised release date.

== Conception and recording ==
In an interview with BBC Radio 1Xtra's DJ Semtex, Skepta talked about the emotions behind recording his album to his relationship with Canadian rapper Drake, he revealed that he didn't know how the rapper found out about him, "I can't tell how he heard of me. I will never know, but I'll put my money on him finding me online and searching for my music because that's what he's like – he's a music lover. For me, it was a blessing that he was co-signing me and bigging me up, because I'm still gonna do what I'm gonna do anyway," he continued. "I'm just blessed to have them man supporting. My album came out on the 6th when I was in Toronto and it's like home. The way they've got me out there is mad."

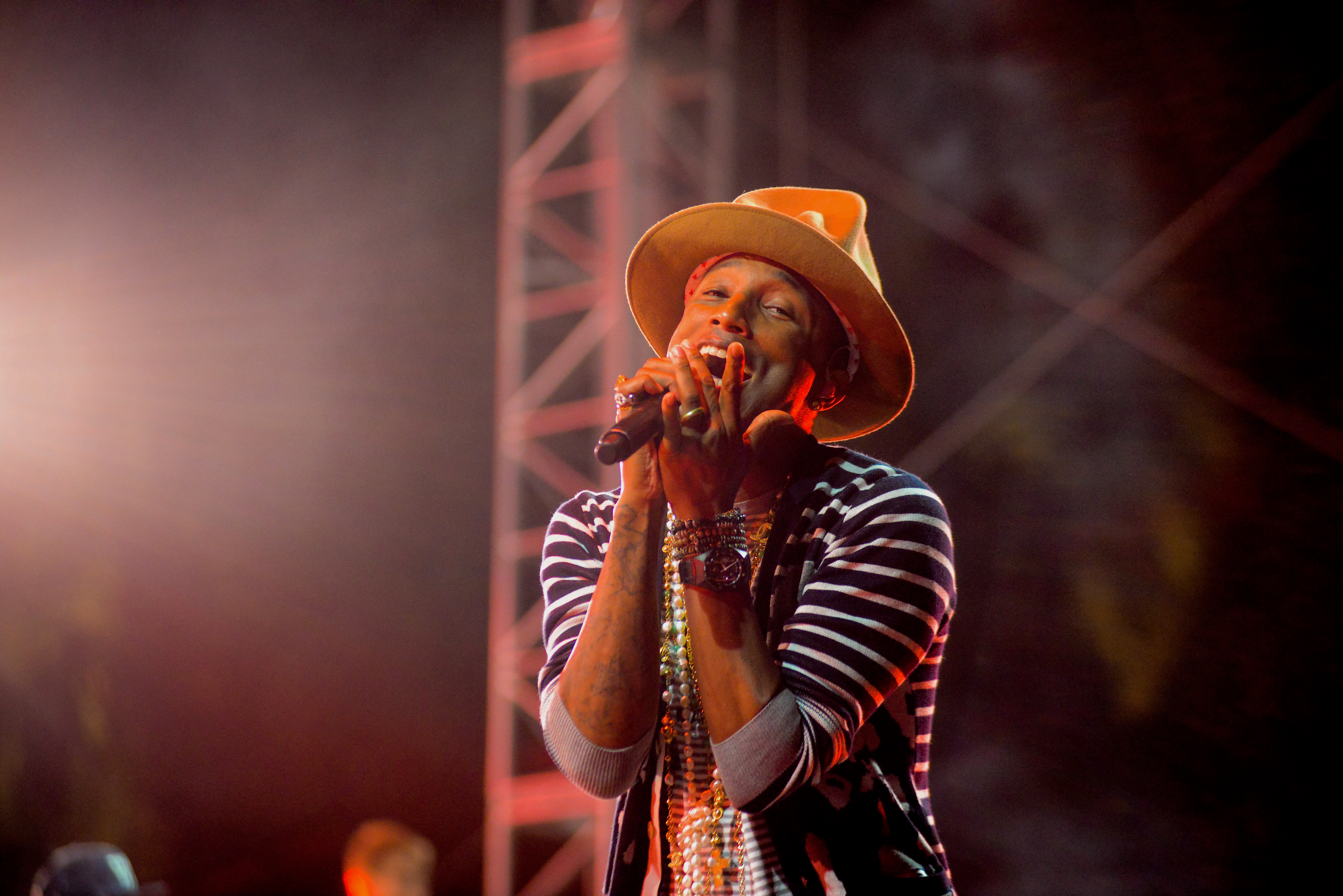
Pharrell Williams worked with Skepta on the album.

Skepta explained that he considered his album to be like "a movie", "Konnichiwa is a classic, The album [was] delayed for kick drums. To put it out was a definite happy point." He also talked about dealing with his critics in the grime scene, "I'm out for revenge, fam, I come into this ting pure-hearted and loving music, and people take me for an idiot, you get what I'm saying? So when I spit now people are gonna hear a madman, they're gonna hear a monster, they're gonna hear someone who's out for revenge - and I'm out for revenge". Skepta stated that music would "represent the country" (Britain).

Konnichiwa was executively produced by Skepta himself, who produced all but three songs on the album. During the production stages Skepta used mostly an old-school toolkit, drum and bass sounds and the odd twinkling piano riff or brass volley. Speaking about his choice to produce the album and use the latter tools Skepta stated "I want anybody from around the world to be able to listen to the album and know it comes from London." One producer who Skepta did work with was singer Pharrell. Skepta described their studio time and their musical relationship like working with "someone I've known all my life, and we're both there to make the sickest track that we can."

== Release and promotion ==
After numerous delays, it was released on 6 May 2016 by Boy Better Know. The album was launched with a party in Tokyo on 5 May 2016 arranged and broadcast globally by live streaming platform Boiler Room, featuring Skepta performing the whole album live with supporting performances from Japanese artists Kohh, Dutch Montana, Loota, and DJ Riki.

Skepta began his "Banned From America" two-part, 14-show tour on April 16, 2017, at the Coachella Valley Music and Arts Festival, which will cover cities throughout the United States and Europe. The tour was named as such in reference to Skepta's forced cancellation of his 2016 "No Fear" American tour in support of Konnichiwa, when his application for a visa to enter the United States was denied.

=== Singles ===
"That's Not Me" was released as the lead single from the album on 8 June 2014. It peaked to number 21 on the UK Singles Chart. "Shutdown" was released as the second single from the album on 26 April 2015. It peaked to number 39 on the UK Singles Chart. "Ladies Hit Squad" was released as the third single from the album on 14 February 2016. It peaked to number 89 on the UK Singles Chart. "Man" was released as the fourth single from the album on 14 April 2016. It peaked to number 34 on the UK Singles Chart.

== Critical reception ==
Professional ratings
Aggregate scores
Source	Rating
AnyDecentMusic?	7.9/10
Metacritic	83/100
Review scores
Source	Rating
AllMusic	4/5 stars
Financial Times	3/5 stars
The Guardian	4/5 stars
The Independent	4/5 stars
The Irish Times	4/5 stars
NME	5/5
The Observer	4/5 stars
Pitchfork	7.8/10
Q	4/5 stars
Record Collector	4/5 stars

Konnichiwa was met with critical acclaim. It received a normalized metascore of 83 out of 100 on the review aggregate website Metacritic based on 18 critics, which indicates "universal acclaim". Alex Petridis of The Guardian gave the album 4 out of 5 stars saying, "The architect of grime's resurgence might have an eye on the US market, but he's a distinctively, winningly English rapper." Louis Pattison of NME gave the album 5 out of 5 stars saying, "'Konnichiwa' is a landmark in British street music, a record good enough to take on the world without having to compromise one inch in the process."

Konnichiwa won the 2016 Mercury Music Prize, beating David Bowie, Radiohead and Kano.

=== Accolades ===
Publication	Accolade	Rank	Ref.
Apple Music	Best Album of 2016	1	
The Independent	Best Albums of 2016	12	
The Guardian	Best Albums of 2016	9	
Mojo	The 50 Best Albums of 2016	25	
NME	NME's Albums of the Year 2016	4	
Pitchfork	20 Best Rap Albums of 2016	—N/a	
Rough Trade	Albums of the Year	62	
The Quietus	Albums of the Year 2016	15	

== Commercial performance ==
On 9 May 2016, the album was at number one on the UK Official Chart Update and was only 2,000 copies ahead of Beyoncé's album Lemonade. The album entered the UK Albums Chart at number two, behind Radiohead's album A Moon Shaped Pool. The album entered the Swedish Albums Chart at number 54. The album entered the Dutch Albums Chart at number 31. The album entered the Swiss Albums Chart at number 38. The album entered the New Zealand Albums Chart at number 27. The album entered the Australian Albums Chart at number 13. The album entered the US Billboard 200 at number 160.

By September 2019, the album had sold at least 191,000 copies in the United Kingdom.

== Track listing ==
Standard edition
No.	Title	Writer(s)	Producer(s)	Length
1.	"Konnichiwa"	Joseph Junior Adenuga	Skepta; Ragz Originale^{[a]}	3:16
2.	"Lyrics" (featuring Novelist)	Jr. Adenuga; Kojo Kankam	Skepta	2:36
3.	"Corn on the Curb" (featuring Wiley and Chip)	Jr. Adenuga; Richard Cowie; Jahmaal Fyffe	Skepta	5:01
4.	"Crime Riddim"	Jr. Adenuga	Blakie; Jason Adenuga^{[a]}	4:36
5.	"It Ain't Safe" (featuring Young Lord)	Jr. Adenuga; Jabari Shelton	Skepta	3:43
6.	"Ladies Hit Squad" (featuring D Double E and ASAP Nast)	Jr. Adenuga; Darren Dixon; Tariq Devega	Skepta; Jason Adenuga^{[a]}	4:39
7.	"Numbers" (featuring Pharrell Williams)	Jr. Adenuga; Pharrell Williams	Pharrell Williams; Skepta	3:20
8.	"Man"	Jr. Adenuga; Josh Homme	Skepta	3:34
9.	"Shutdown"	Jr. Adenuga	Ragz Originale; Skepta	3:08
10.	"That's Not Me" (featuring Jme)	Jr. Adenuga; Jamie Adenuga	Skepta	3:05
11.	"Detox" (featuring BBK)	Jr. Adenuga; Aaron Lawrence; Deshane Cornwall; Jahmek Power	Footsie	2:47
12.	"Text Me Back"	Jr. Adenuga	Ragz Originale	4:24
Total length:				43:11

Notes

- ^{^[a]} signifies an additional producer
- "Konnichiwa" features uncredited vocals by Fifi Rong.
- "Shutdown" features uncredited vocals by Drake.
- "Detox" features guest verses by Boy Better Know members Shorty, Frisco and Jammer.
- "Text Me Back" features uncredited vocals by Cartae.
- "Text Me Back" is followed by a 53-second clip of "Sand Ocean", an instrumental production by Jason Adenuga.

Sample credits

- "Man" features a sample of "Regular John" by Queens of the Stone Age.

== Charts and certifications ==
=== Weekly charts ===
Chart (2016)	Peak position
Australian Albums (ARIA)	13
Belgian Albums (Ultratop Flanders)	68
Dutch Albums (Album Top 100)	31
Irish Albums (IRMA)	13
New Zealand Albums (RMNZ)	27
Scottish Albums (Official Charts)	5
Swedish Albums (Sverigetopplistan)	54
Swiss Albums (Schweizer Hitparade)	38
UK Albums (Official Charts)	2
UK Independent Albums (Official Charts)	1
UK R&B Albums (Official Charts)	1
US Billboard 200	160

=== Year-end charts ===
Chart (2016)	Position
UK Albums (OCC)	58

=== Certifications ===
Region	Certification	Certified units/sales
New Zealand (RMNZ)	Platinum	15,000^{‡}
United Kingdom (BPI)	Gold	117,400
^{‡} Sales+streaming figures based on certification alone.

== Release history ==
Country	Date	Label	Format
United Kingdom	6 May 2016	Boy Better Know	CD; digital download

== See also ==
- List of UK Independent Albums Chart number ones of 2016
