= It Ain't Safe =

Song by Skepta featuring Young Lord

from the album Konnichiwa
- Released: 2 November 2014
- Recorded: 2013/14
- Genre: Grime
- Length: 3:43
- Label: Boy Better Know
- Songwriter(s): Joseph Adenuga; Jabari Shelton
- Producer(s): Skepta

"It Ain't Safe" is a song performed by British rapper Skepta, featuring a hook from Young Lord (also known as ASAP Bari). It was released in the form of a promotional video on 2 November 2014, and features on Skepta's fourth album Konnichiwa (2016). Despite being unavailable to buy until the release of the album, the song peaked at number 32 on the UK R&B Singles Chart due to strong streaming performance.

== Music video ==
A music video to accompany the release of "It Ain't Safe" was first released onto YouTube on 31 October 2014 at a total length of four minutes and seventeen seconds.

== Chart performance ==
=== Weekly charts ===
Chart (2014)	Peak position
UK Hip Hop/R&B (OCC)	32

== Certifications ==
Certifications and sales for "It Ain't Safe"
Region	Certification	Certified units/sales
New Zealand (RMNZ)	Platinum	30,000^{‡}
United Kingdom (BPI)	Silver	200,000^{‡}
^{‡} Sales+streaming figures based on certification alone.

== Release history ==
Region	Date	Format	Label
United Kingdom	2 November 2014	Digital download	Boy Better Know
