= Microphone Champion =

Studio album by Skepta
- Released: 1 June 2009
- Recorded: 2007–2009
- Genre: Grime
- Length: 52:59
- Label: Boy Better Know
- Producer: Skepta (also exec.); Bless Beats; Boom Productions; Chad Jackson; Jme; Rudekid; Silencer

Skepta chronology
Greatest Hits (2007)	Microphone Champion (2009)	Been There Done That (2010)

Singles from Microphone Champion
- 1. "Rolex Sweep" Released: 15 September 2008; 2. "Sunglasses at Night" Released: 16 March 2009; 3. "Too Many Man" Released: 18 May 2009; 4. "Lush" Released: 12 October 2009

Microphone Champion is the second studio album by English grime MC Skepta, released on 1 June 2009. It includes the single "Too Many Man" featuring Boy Better Know, also featured on Wiley's own album, Race Against Time, and Shorty's "Short Man Syndrome".

== Singles ==
- "Rolex Sweep" is the first single from the album. It was released on 15 September 2008; it reached number 89 on the UK Singles Chart.
- "Sunglasses at Night", a non-album track, was released as a single on 16 March 2009;. It reached number 64 on the UK Singles Chart.
- "Too Many Man", featuring fellow artists from Boy Better Know, is the second single from the album. It was released on 18 May 2009; it reached number 79 on the UK Singles Chart.
- "Lush", featuring Jay Sean, is the third and final single from the album. It was released on 12 October 2009.

== Track listing ==
No.	Title	Writer(s)	Producer(s)	Length
1.	"Reflecting"	Joseph Adenuga	Skepta	3:16
2.	"Are You Ready?" (featuring Wiley)	Joseph Adenuga; Richard Cowie	Rudekid	2:21
3.	"Oh My Gosh"	Joseph Adenuga; Jamie Adenuga	Jme	2:32
4.	"Look Out" (featuring Giggs)	Joseph Adenuga; Nathaniel Thompson	Boom Productions	4:20
5.	"Sticks and Stones"	Joseph Adenuga	Skepta	3:21
6.	"Too Many Man" (featuring Boy Better Know)	Joseph Adenuga; Jamie Adenuga; Aaron Lawrence; Deshane Cornwall; Cowie	Skepta	3:34
7.	"Lush" (featuring Jay Sean)	Joseph Adenuga; Kamaljit Jhooti	Skepta	2:47
8.	"My Emotions"	Joseph Adenuga	Skepta	2:42
9.	"Skepta"	Joseph Adenuga; Chad Jackson	Chad Jackson	2:26
10.	"Amsterdam (Skit)"			1:00
11.	"Disguise" (featuring Jme and Jammer)	Joseph Adenuga; Jamie Adenuda; Jahmek Power	Skepta	3:20
12.	"Gingerbread Man"	Joseph Adenuga	Silencer	3:06
13.	"Ed Hardy Party" (featuring Tinchy Stryder)	Joseph Adenuga; Kwasi Danquah III	Skepta	2:49
14.	"Madness" (featuring Dubz and Paper Pablo)	Joseph Adenuga; Dubz; Paper Pablo	Skepta	3:57
15.	"Over the Top"	Joseph Adenuga	Skepta	2:51
16.	"Dark" (featuring Trigga)	Joseph Adenuga; Trigga	Skepta	3:25
17.	"Sunglasses at Night" (bonus track)	Joseph Adenuga	Skepta	2:21
18.	"Rolex Sweep" (bonus track)	Joseph Adenuga; Gareth Keane	Bless Beats	2:34
Total length:				52:59

Notes

- The bonus tracks "Rolex Sweep" and "Sunglasses at Night" are only available on the CD version of the album.

Sample credits

- "Over the Top" contains samples of "Top Billin'", written and performed by Audio Two.
- "Disguise" uses an interpolation of the Transformers theme music.

== Release history ==
Region	Date	Format	Label
United Kingdom	1 June 2009	Digital download, CD	Boy Better Know
