= Integrity (album) =

Integrity>

Studio album by Jme
- Released: 4 May 2015
- Recorded: 2010–15
- Genre: Grime
- Length: 50:28
- Label: Boy Better Know
- Producer: Jme (also exec.); Deeco; Joker; Mystry; Preditah; Rude Kid; Swifta Beater; Teeza; Tommy Kruise

Jme chronology
Blam! (2010)	Integrity> (2015)	Grime MC (2019)

Singles from Integrity>
- 1. "96 Fuckries" Released: 15 January 2012; 2. "Work" Released: 14 July 2013; 3. "Integrity" Released: 29 September 2013; 4. "Taking Over" Released: 23 February 2014; 5. "Man Don't Care" Released: 4 May 2015; 6. "Test Me" Released: 3 September 2015

Integrity> is the third album by grime rapper Jme, It was released on 4 May 2015 independently on Boy Better Know. Throughout the years leading up to the album, Jme released numerous singles such as "96 Fuckries" and "Work" that were included on the track list of Integrity>. "Calm" was originally credited as Tommy Kruise featuring Jme, and appeared on his October 2014 EP entitled Fête Foreign. The album was commercially successful, entering the UK Albums Chart at number 12. It is one of the 19 records nominated for the IMPALA Album of the Year Award 2015.

The album features guest appearances from fellow Boy Better Know MCs Skepta, Frisco, Shorty, Jammer and British rappers Giggs, Wiley, D Double E and Big Narstie. Production varies from Jme, Preditah, Swifta Beater, Deeco and Rude Kid, among others. On 8 January 2016, the instrumentals for the entire album were released on limited edition clear vinyl.

The first single "96 Fuckries" narrowly missed on the Top 40, entering at number 41, becoming Jme's highest-charting solo single.

== Chart performance ==
Integrity> entered the UK Albums Chart at number 12, becoming Jme's highest-charting album and first top 40 album. In its second week of charting it remained in the top 40 at number 32. The album spent 4 weeks on the Albums Chart. On the UK R&B Chart it entered at number 1 and number 7 on the UK Download Chart.

== Critical reception ==
Professional ratings
Review scores
Source	Rating
Crack Magazine	8/10

== Track listing ==
No.	Title	Producer(s)	Length
1.	"Pulse 8"	Mystry	2:17
2.	"96 F**Kries"	Deeco	2:52
3.	"Taking Over"	Preditah	2:52
4.	"Work"	Deeco	3:37
5.	"Game"	Rude Kid	3:45
6.	"Same Thing"	Teeza	2:37
7.	"Amen" (featuring Skepta, Frisco, Shorty and Jammer)	Jme	2:04
8.	"Again" (featuring D Double E)	Jme	3:13
9.	"Break You Down" (featuring Big Narstie)	Swifta Beater	3:01
10.	"The Money" (featuring Wiley)	Deeco	2:28
11.	"No You Ain't"	Jme	3:41
12.	"Calm"	Tommy Kruise	3:24
13.	"Man Don't Care" (featuring Giggs)	Swifta Beater	3:33
14.	"Don't @ Me" (featuring Skepta, Frisco and Shorty)	Teeza	3:14
15.	"Test Me"	Joker	4:09
16.	"Integrity"	Jme	3:40
Total length:			50:28

== Charts ==
Chart (2015)	Peak position
UK Albums (OCC)	12
UK Album Downloads (OCC)	7
UK R&B Albums (OCC)	1

== Certifications ==
Region	Certification	Certified units/sales
United Kingdom (BPI)	Gold	100,000^{‡}
^{‡} Sales+streaming figures based on certification alone.
