= Sunglasses at Night (Skepta song) =

Single by Skepta

from the album Microphone Champion
- Released: 16 March 2009
- Recorded: 2009
- Genre: Hip hop
- Length: 2:21
- Label: Boy Better Know

Skepta singles chronology
| "Rolex Sweep" (2008) | "Sunglasses at Night" (2009) | "Too Many Man" (2009) |

"Sunglasses at Night" is a song by British grime artist, Skepta. The song was released as a digital download on 16 March 2009 as the second single from his second studio album Microphone Champion (2009). It samples the original song of the same title by Corey Hart. The song peaked at number 64 on the UK Singles Chart.

== Track listing ==
Digital download
| No. | Title | Length |
|---|---|---|
| 1. | "Sunglasses at Night" | 2:21 |

== Charts ==
| Chart (2009) | Peak position |
|---|---|
| UK Singles (OCC) | 64 |
| UK R&B (Official Charts Company) | 17 |
