= Too Many Man =

2009 Single by Boy Better Know

Single by Boy Better Know

from the album Microphone Champion, Famous? and Race Against Time
- Released: 25 May 2009
- Recorded: 2008
- Genre: Grime; UK funky
- Length: 3:36
- Label: Boy Better Know
- Songwriters: Deshane Cornwall; Jamie Adenuga; Joseph Adenuga; Richard Cowie
- Producer: Skepta

Boy Better Know singles chronology
| "Too Many Man" (2009) | "Goin' In" (2010) |

"Too Many Man" is the debut single by English grime group Boy Better Know, released on 25 May 2009. It broke into the UK singles chart on 6 June 2009, peaking at #79 the following week.

The song was originally conceptualised by Skepta, due to his annoyance over the "lack of women" in nightclubs. The song features BBK members Skepta, Shorty, Jme, Frisco and Wiley. As well as being released as a single, it was also included on Jme's debut studio album Famous? (2008), Skepta's sophomore album Microphone Champion (2009), and Wiley's album Race Against Time (2009). It is the group's most successful and well known song.

== Track listing ==
- CD
1. "Too Many Man" – 3:36
2. "Sticks & Stones" – 3:21

== Charts ==
| Chart (2009) | Peak position |
|---|---|
| UK Singles (Official Charts) | 79 |

== Certifications ==
| Region | Certification | Certified units/sales |
|---|---|---|
| United Kingdom (BPI) | Gold | 400,000^{‡} |
^{‡} Sales+streaming figures based on certification alone.
