= Ladies Hit Squad =

Ladies Hit Squad may refer to:

- The UK garage crew founded by Wiley, DJ Target and Maxwell D
- "Ladies Hit Squad", a 2016 rap song by Skepta featuring D Double E and ASAP Nast
