= Man Don't Care =

2015 single by JME

Single by JME featuring Giggs

from the album Integrity>
- Released: 4 May 2015
- Recorded: 2015
- Genre: British hip hop; grime; Road rap
- Length: 3:30
- Label: Boy Better Know
- Songwriters: Jamie Adenuga; Nathaniel Thompson
- Producer: Swifta Beater

Jme singles chronology
| "Say Nada" (2015) | "Man Don't Care" (2015) | "Test Me" (2015) |

Giggs singles chronology
| "(Is It Gangsta?) Yes Yes Yes" (2013) | "Man Don't Care" (2015) | "Who's Dat" (2015) |

Music video
- "Man Don't Care" on YouTube

"Man Don't Care" is a song by British rapper JME featuring fellow British rapper Giggs from JME's third studio album Integrity> (2015). It was released as the fifth single from the album on 4 May 2015, the same day the album was released.

== Critical response ==
Tom Watson of Crack magazine wrote: "In "Man Don't Care", his [JME's] verbal physicality is pitiless, swearing to box anyone in the mouth with his BMW X6 key if they try to violate his lifework. By all means, this is all just hyped up trash talk, but his bars are sprayed with such brute professionalism that we can allow ourselves to suspend disbelief."

In 2019, Complex magazine placed the song at number 4 on their list of "Grime's Most Impactful Songs of the 2010s".

== Commercial performance ==
"Man Don't Care" debuted at number 100 on the UK Singles Chart on 16 October 2015, making the song JME's sixth entry on the chart as a lead artist. However, this is the only week the song would appear on the chart. It also peaked at number 14 on the UK Hip Hop and R&B Singles Chart and at number 4 on the UK Independent Singles Chart.

The song was certified platinum by the British Phonographic Industry in August 2020.

== Music video ==
The music video premiered on YouTube on 4 May 2015, coinciding with the release of "Man Don't Care" as a single and was directed by Matt Walker. The video features both JME and Giggs, and has a cameo appearance by British YouTuber TBJZL. As of March 2024, the music video has over 63 million views on YouTube.

== Awards and nominations ==
| Year | Ceremony | Award | Result |
|---|---|---|---|
| 2015 | MOBO Awards | Best Song | Nominated |

== Charts ==
| Chart (2015–16) | Peak position |
|---|---|
| UK Singles (OCC) | 100 |
| UK Hip Hop/R&B (OCC) | 14 |
| UK Indie (OCC) | 4 |
| UK Singles Downloads (OCC) | 83 |
| UK Singles Sales (OCC) | 83 |

== Certifications ==
| Region | Certification | Certified units/sales |
|---|---|---|
| United Kingdom (BPI) | Platinum | 600,000^{‡} |
^{‡} Sales+streaming figures based on certification alone.
