= That's Not Me (Skepta song) =

Single by Skepta featuring Jme

from the album Konnichiwa
- Released: 8 June 2014
- Recorded: 2013
- Genre: Grime
- Length: 3:05
- Label: Boy Better Know; 3 Beat
- Songwriters: Jamie Adenuga; Joseph Junior Adenuga
- Producer: Skepta

Skepta singles chronology
"Can You Hear Me? (Ayayaya)" (2012)	"That's Not Me" (2014)	"Supposed to Do" (2014)

Jme singles chronology
"German Whip" (2014)	"That's Not Me" (2014)	"Rari WorkOut" (2014)

"That's Not Me" is a song by British MC Skepta, featuring his brother Jme. It was released on 8 June 2014 as a digital download in the United Kingdom on iTunes as the lead single from Skepta's fourth album Konnichiwa (2016). The song peaked at number 21 on the UK Singles Chart.

"That's Not Me" is an intentional throwback to the early era of grime music. Complex magazine ranked the song number 1 on its list of "Grime's Most Impactful Songs of the 2010s" , calling it "one for the history books".

== Music video ==
A music video directed by Tim and Barry to accompany the release of "That's Not Me" was first released on YouTube on 13 April 2014, at a total length of 3:04. It was preceded by a short documentary shot on VHS in a style intended to invoke early grime DVDs such as Lord of the Mics and Practice Hours. This video, which had a budget of £80, won the Award for Best Video at the 2014 MOBO Awards.

== Track listings ==
Digital download – Single
No.	Title	Length
1.	"That's Not Me" (featuring Jme) (Radio Edit Explicit)	3:04

Digital download - Remix
No.	Title	Length
1.	"That's Not Me" (featuring D Double E, Tempa T, President T, Sox & Jaykae) (Remix)	3:28
2.	"That's Not Me" (Instrumental)	3:28

== Chart performance ==
=== Weekly charts ===
Chart (2014)	Peak position
UK Dance (OCC)	7
UK Singles (OCC)	21

== Certifications ==
Region	Certification	Certified units/sales
New Zealand (RMNZ)	Gold	15,000^{‡}
United Kingdom (BPI)	2× Platinum	1,200,000^{‡}
^{‡} Sales+streaming figures based on certification alone.

== Release history ==
Region	Date	Format	Label
United Kingdom	8 June 2014	Digital download	3 Beat
