= London Tonight Freestyle =

Single by Dean Blunt featuring Skepta, Novelist and ASAP Rocky
- Released: November 21, 2022
- Genre: Hip-hop; trip hop
- Length: 2:30
- Label: World Music
- Producer: Dean Blunt

Dean Blunt singles chronology
| "Death Drive Freestyle" (2022) | "London Tonight Freestyle" (2022) | "Pressed" (2023) |

"London Tonight Freestyle" (stylised in all caps) is a song by British musician Dean Blunt featuring British rappers Skepta and Novelist, as well as American rapper ASAP Rocky. It was first released to Blunt's YouTube channel on July 17, 2022, but was later deleted from it. It was then uploaded to digital streaming services as a single on November 21. Produced by Blunt, the song's composition consists of violins, pianos, and drums, which have been stylistically compared to trip hop. Skepta and Novelist deliver rap verses, while ASAP Rocky sings a melodic outro. The song received positive reviews from music critics, who often praised its production and rapping.

== Background and release ==
All four artists featured on "London Tonight Freestyle" had collaborated several times before its release. Dean Blunt had contributed production to ASAP Rocky's third studio album, Testing (2018), which also featured Skepta on the track "Praise the Lord (Da Shine)". In June 2022, ASAP Rocky previewed an unreleased collaboration between him and Skepta at the 23rd Splash! festival, which was produced by Novelist.

"London Tonight Freestyle" was first released by Blunt to his YouTube channel on July 17, 2022. Novelist tweeted after the song's release, calling it a leak as he was unaware Blunt would be releasing it. In a post he deleted shortly after making it, Novelist admired Blunt's mysterious release schedule. The release followed Blunt's Freestyles SS22 extended play (EP), which was previously released in May 2022. On November 21, Blunt uploaded the song to streaming services, marking its first official release.

== Composition ==
"London Tonight Freestyle" is produced by Blunt, and consists of layered strings and piano keys. Its production style has drawn comparisons to trip hop, with Sniffers attributing this to its drums. Skepta raps the song's first verse, with his opening line referencing the song "Ice Box" (2006) by Omarion. It consists of lyrics about his lifestyle, as does the next verse by Novelist. Instead of rapping, ASAP Rocky sings a melodic outro, which is sung alongside Blunt.

== Critical reception ==
"London Tonight Freestyle" received generally positive reviews from music critics. Writing for HotNewHipHop, Aron A. praised Blunt's "hazy, string-laden production", which turns the song into a "psychedelic banger." He particularly lauded Novelist's verse, saying he "slides through with a slow-burning flow that tears through the violins." GRM Daily similarly complimented the song's beat as being "sophisticated", noting both rap verses as being strong, as did Sniffers. Billy Ward of DMY called the song "one of the year’s most unexpected collaborations."

=== Accolades ===
Calling "London Tonight Freestyle" the third best song of 2022, DMY called the collaboration "a huge link up" that created "a piece of history." Referencing positive reception from fans, the publication was inclined to agree that the song was "legendary".

Select rankings for "London Tonight Freestyle"
| Publication | List | Year | Rank | Ref. |
|---|---|---|---|---|
| DMY | The 25 Best Tracks of 2022 | 2022 | 3 | |
