= Olivia Rose =

British photographer

Olivia Rose (born 1985) is a British portrait photographer and music video director, living in London. Her photographs are held in the collection of the National Portrait Gallery, London.

== Life and work ==
Rose was born and grew up in north west London. Her grandmother is Bermudian and she has other family living there.

She has made portraits of contemporary UK musicians and shot fashion editorial.

== Publications ==
- This Is Grime. London: Hodder & Stoughton, 2016. Text by Hattie Collins, photographs by Rose. ISBN 9781473639270.

== Music videos directed by Rose ==
- "Pure Water" by Skepta
- "East Atlanta Love Letter" by 6lack ft. Future
- "Blue Lights" by Jorja Smith – winner, Best Urban Video – UK, UK Music Video Awards, 2018

== Awards ==
- 2016: Winner, Photographer of the Year, Words by Women Awards, London

== Collections ==
Rose's work is held in the following permanent collection:

- National Portrait Gallery, London: 6 prints (as of 22 May 2023)
