= Konnichiwa =

Konnichiwa (Japanese for "hello") or Konnichi wa may refer to:

- Konichiwa Records, a Swedish record label
- Konnichiwa (Skepta album), 2016, and its title track
- Konnichiwa (Youmou & Ohana album), 2008
- Konnichiwa, a 2003 album by Charm featuring Ailyn
- "Konnichiwa" (The Superions song), 2014
- "Konnichiwa", a song by Shonen Knife from the 1998 album Happy Hour
- "Konnichiwa", a song by Shanadoo from the 2006 album Welcome to Tokyo
- "Konnichiwa" a 2015 song by Mike Williams

== See also ==
- "Konichiwa Bitches", a 2007 single by Robyn
- "Kanashimi yo Konnichi wa", a 1986 song by Yuki Saito
- Kon'nichiwa Anne: Before Green Gables, a series in the World Masterpiece Theater anime
