= Race Against Time (album) =

Studio album by Wiley
- Released: 8 June 2009
- Genres: Grime; eskibeat
- Length: 52:05
- Label: Eskibeat Recordings
- Producers: Wiley, Balistiq Beats, Nathan Retro, Danny Weed, Skream, Maniac, Skepta, Bless Beats, Deeco, Y.Wizz

Wiley chronology
See Clear Now (2008)	Race Against Time (2009)	100% Publishing (2011)

Singles from Race Against Time
- 1. "Too Many Man" Released: 18 May 2009

Race Against Time is the sixth studio album released by English grime artist Wiley on Eskibeat Recordings on 8 June 2009. It is in contrast to his previous album released, See Clear Now (2008), a pop rap and electronic album that featured numerous top 40 hits.

It includes the single "Too Many Man" featuring Boy Better Know, also featured on Skepta's own album Microphone Champion (2009).

== Track listing ==
No.	Title	Producer(s)	Length
1.	"Headbanger"	Balistiq Beats	3:48
2.	"She's Glowing (Remix)" (featuring Ghetts & Kano)	Wiley	3:03
3.	"Eyes of the Lord"	Nathan Retro	3:02
4.	"Hummer Activity"	Danny Weed	2:44
5.	"Off the Radar"	Danny Weed	5:40
6.	"The Olly" (featuring MC Dream)	Skream	2:58
7.	"I Was Like You"	Maniac	3:08
8.	"Race Against Time"	Maniac	2:56
9.	"Too Many Man" (featuring Boy Better Know)	Skepta	3:33
10.	"Where's My Brother"	Bless Beats	2:36
11.	"Out of the Game"	Skeamz	3:10
12.	"Bang"	Wiley	2:44
13.	"Zip It Up" (featuring Giggs & Trigga)	Wiley	3:29
14.	"Average Worker"	Maniac	2:45
15.	"Time Flies By"	Deeco	3:15
16.	"Music I Like"	Y.Wizz	3:18
Total length:			52:05
