= Praise the Lord (Da Shine) =

2018 single by ASAP Rocky

Single by ASAP Rocky featuring Skepta

from the album Testing
- Released: June 26, 2018
- Genre: Hip hop; trap
- Length: 3:26
- Label: ASAP Forever; Polo Grounds; RCA
- Songwriters: Rakim Mayers; Joseph Adenuga; Hector Delgado
- Producer: Skepta

ASAP Rocky singles chronology
"ASAP Forever" (2018)	"Praise the Lord (Da Shine)" (2018)	"Potato Salad" (2018)

Skepta singles chronology
"Energy (Stay Far Away)" (2018)	"Praise The Lord (Da Shine)" (2018)	"Jumpy Remix" (2018)

Music video
- "Praise The Lord (Da Shine)" on YouTube

"Praise the Lord (Da Shine)" is a song by American rapper ASAP Rocky featuring vocals and sole production from English rapper Skepta, released as the second single from the former's third studio album Testing on June 26, 2018. It marks the third collaboration between both artists, following Skepta's appearance on ASAP Mob's Cozy Tapes Vol. 1: Friends and Rocky's appearance on Skepta's Vicious EP in 2017.

The song was successful in a number of countries, peaking at number 45 on the US Billboard Hot 100 and number 18 on the UK Official Singles Chart. It was later certified quadruple platinum by the Recording Industry Association of America (RIAA) and double platinum by the British Phonographic Industry (BPI).

== Background ==
ASAP Rocky and Skepta had collaborated twice prior to the release of Praise the Lord, working on ASAP Mob's Cozy Tapes Vol. 1: Friends in 2016 and Skepta's Vicious EP in 2017. In his Verified video with Genius, Rocky revealed the entirety of the song was written in London while both him and Skepta were heavily under the influence of LSD. The song features a sample from "Andean Stroll Panpipe 02" from Apple's GarageBand Jam Pack: World Music add-on for GarageBand.

== Music video ==
The music video was directed by Dexter Navy and released to ASAP Rocky's YouTube channel on June 5, 2018. It features a split screen showing scenes filmed in both New York and London, with cameo appearances from Tyler, the Creator, members of ASAP Mob and Skepta's younger brother Jme.

== Charts ==
=== Weekly charts ===
Chart (2018–19)	Peak position
Australia (ARIA)	33
Austria (Ö3 Austria Top 40)	38
Belgium (Ultratop 50 Flanders)	25
Belgium (Ultratip Bubbling Under Wallonia)	25
Canada Hot 100 (Billboard)	22
Denmark (Tracklisten)	16
France (SNEP)	41
Germany (GfK)	59
Latvia (LAIPA)	22
Netherlands (Single Top 100)	65
New Zealand (Recorded Music NZ)	11
Norway (VG-lista)	31
Sweden (Sverigetopplistan)	48
Switzerland (Schweizer Hitparade)	14
UK Singles (Official Charts)	18
UK Hip Hop/R&B (Official Charts)	8
US Billboard Hot 100	45
US Hot R&B/Hip-Hop Songs (Billboard)	22
US Hot Rap Songs (Billboard)	16

=== Year-end charts ===
Chart (2018)	Position
Australia (ARIA)	97
Belgium (Ultratop Flanders)	81
Canada (Canadian Hot 100)	100
France (SNEP)	153
Portugal (AFP)	190
Switzerland (Schweizer Hitparade)	93
UK Singles (Official Charts Company)	84
Chart (2019)	Position
Latvia (LAIPA)	28

== Certifications ==
Region	Certification	Certified units/sales
Australia (ARIA)	3× Platinum	210,000^{‡}
Canada (Music Canada)	3× Platinum	240,000^{‡}
Denmark (IFPI Danmark)	2× Platinum	180,000^{‡}
France (SNEP)	Diamond	333,333^{‡}
Germany (BVMI)	Gold	200,000^{‡}
Italy (FIMI)	Platinum	100,000^{‡}
New Zealand (RMNZ)	7× Platinum	210,000^{‡}
Poland (ZPAV)	4× Platinum	200,000^{‡}
Portugal (AFP)	2× Platinum	20,000^{‡}
Spain (Promusicae)	Gold	30,000^{‡}
Switzerland (IFPI Switzerland)	Gold	10,000^{‡}
United Kingdom (BPI)	2× Platinum	1,200,000^{‡}
United States (RIAA)	4× Platinum	4,000,000^{‡}
Streaming
Greece (IFPI Greece)	4× Platinum	8,000,000^{†}
Sweden (GLF)	Gold	4,000,000^{†}
^{‡} Sales+streaming figures based on certification alone.^{†} Streaming-only figures based on certification alone.
