= Pure Water (Skepta song) =

Single by Skepta

from the album Ignorance Is Bliss
- Released: 8 May 2018
- Genre: Grime
- Length: 3:07
- Label: Boy Better Know
- Songwriter: Joseph Adenuga
- Producer: Skepta

Skepta singles chronology
"Nang" (2018)	"Pure Water" (2018)	"Energy (Stay Far Away)" (2018)

"Pure Water" is a song by English grime artist Skepta, released as a single in 2018 by Boy Better Know. The song references the sachets of water that are sold by street vendors in West Africa. It debuted and peaked at number 78 on the UK Singles Chart.

== Critical reception ==
Stereogum stated that the song starts with a "nursery rhyme riff before slinking into a rubbery, muscular beat", with Skepta rapping "Pure water and lots of ice/ She knows that I be the boss of life." Noisey pointed out the song's use of puns in relation to the title, including references to "ice", and complimented Skepta's wit, as well as how he sounds over the "sparse, percussive beat". Complex called the track "ice cold" and said Skepta delivers his "trademark flow over self-produced signature sounds", calling it "another entry into a long line of bass-heavy, all-out grime tracks in his back catalogue". NME called it one of Skepta's most "contemplative" tracks "to date". HotNewHipHop said Skepta's "direct delivery on the track complements the minimal and smooth production".

== Music video ==
The music video for the song was directed by Olivia Rose. While Skepta teased the music video in June 2018, showing a behind-the-scenes clip of several women wearing lots of jewellery, the full video was uploaded to YouTube on 31 October 2018. The outfits were created and designed by Mowalola Ogunlesi.

== Charts ==
Chart (2018)	Peak position
UK Singles (OCC)	78
