= Sylvia Patterson =

Scottish musical journalist

Sylvia Patterson (born 8 March 1965) is a Scottish author and music journalist from Perth, Scotland, and is one of the most prominent female pop journalists of her generation. A former contributor to Smash Hits and the NME, she is the author of the memoirs I'm Not With The Band (2016), Same Old Girl (2023) and I'm Not With The Man (2026).

== Early life ==
Patterson grew up in Perth, Scotland, the youngest of five children, and attended Perth Grammar School. Her father, an accountant, had been a Japanese prisoner of war on the Burma railway. Her mother worked as a psychiatric nurse, and in her 2016 memoir, I'm Not With The Band, Patterson describes her difficult upbringing, including her mother's alcoholism. Patterson first started writing as a teenager, writing reviews about her 'post punk heroes' for her school magazine.

== Career ==
Her writing career began straight from school. She worked on various magazines for Dundee publisher D.C. Thomson. In February 1986 she moved to London after successfully applying for a staff writer job on her favourite magazine, Smash Hits. Inspired by her mentor, Tom Hibbert, who interviewed her for the job, Patterson was a key contributor in shaping the magazine's much-celebrated irreverent, comic style during its mid- to late-1980s sales peak of a million copies a fortnight. By the early 1990s, Patterson had left Smash Hits to work freelance, going on to become a prolific contributor to the NME, The Face and, by the late 2000s, Q magazine, as well as writing for broadsheets and women’s magazines including Glamour, The Guardian, the Sunday Times and as a weekly columnist for Scotland’s Sunday Herald.

As one of the most prominent female pop journalists of her generation, Patterson is often cited as an inspiration by those who followed her, including Miranda Sawyer (who started at Smash Hits two years after Patterson in 1988), Caitlin Moran and Jude Rogers. Her radio and TV appearances include BBC Radio 4 Woman’s Hour , BBC4's Top Of The Pops: The Story of 1986, and BBC1's The One Show as part of its 2018 retrospective Smash Hits celebration.

In 2024, she was welcomed as a new Royal Literary Fellow. Her fellowship is with Queen Mary, University of London.

== Memoirs ==
In 2016 she published her memoir I'm Not With The Band (its title a play on Pamela Des Barres’ I'm With The Band). It follows Patterson’s journalistic career from the 1980s to the present (revisiting her classic interviews with Madonna, Prince, Eminem, Beyonce, George Michael, Kylie Minogue, Richey Edwards, Amy Winehouse and others) as well as her personal experiences growing up as the child of an alcoholic parent, multiple miscarriages and financial insecurity in the face of the gradual collapse of the music magazine industry itself. The book was shortlisted for the Costa Biography Award, the Penderyn Music Book Award and the NME Awards Best Book Of The Year, eventually winning BBC Radio 1 DJ Annie Nightingale's Book Of The Year.

Her second memoir, Same Old Girl, was published in April 2023. Triggered by Patterson's diagnosis of breast cancer in late 2019, it is described as an "unflinching, poignant and gallows-funny odyssey through the mid-life trials we all face".

In 2026 she published I'm Not With The Man, a ten-years-on companion book to her first memoir I'm Not With The Band. Subtitled A Writer's Life With The Music Mavericks, it is a compendium of her encounters with "pop's last generation of hellraisers" including Marianne Faithfull, John Lydon, Sinead O'Connor, Liam Gallagher, Pete Doherty and Lady Gaga. According to a review in the Sunday Times: "For all her gleeful irreverence, this is a serious book, a loving testament to a lost age, maybe, but also to the transformative potential of pop music — a power that Patterson, for all her Gen X disillusionment, still believes is out there with 'the kids'."

In addition to her own books, Patterson is the ghostwriter of My Amy: The Life We Shared, the memoir of Amy Winehouse's best friend Tyler James, and a 2021 Sunday Times Book of the Year.

== Works ==
- I'm Not With The Band: A Writer’s Life Lost in Music, (2016, Sphere)
- Same Old Girl: Staying Alive, Staying Sane, Staying Myself, (2023, Fleet)
- I'm Not With The Man: A Writer's Life with the Music Mavericks (2026, Fleet)
