= Frisco (rapper) =

British grime MC and member of Boy Better Know

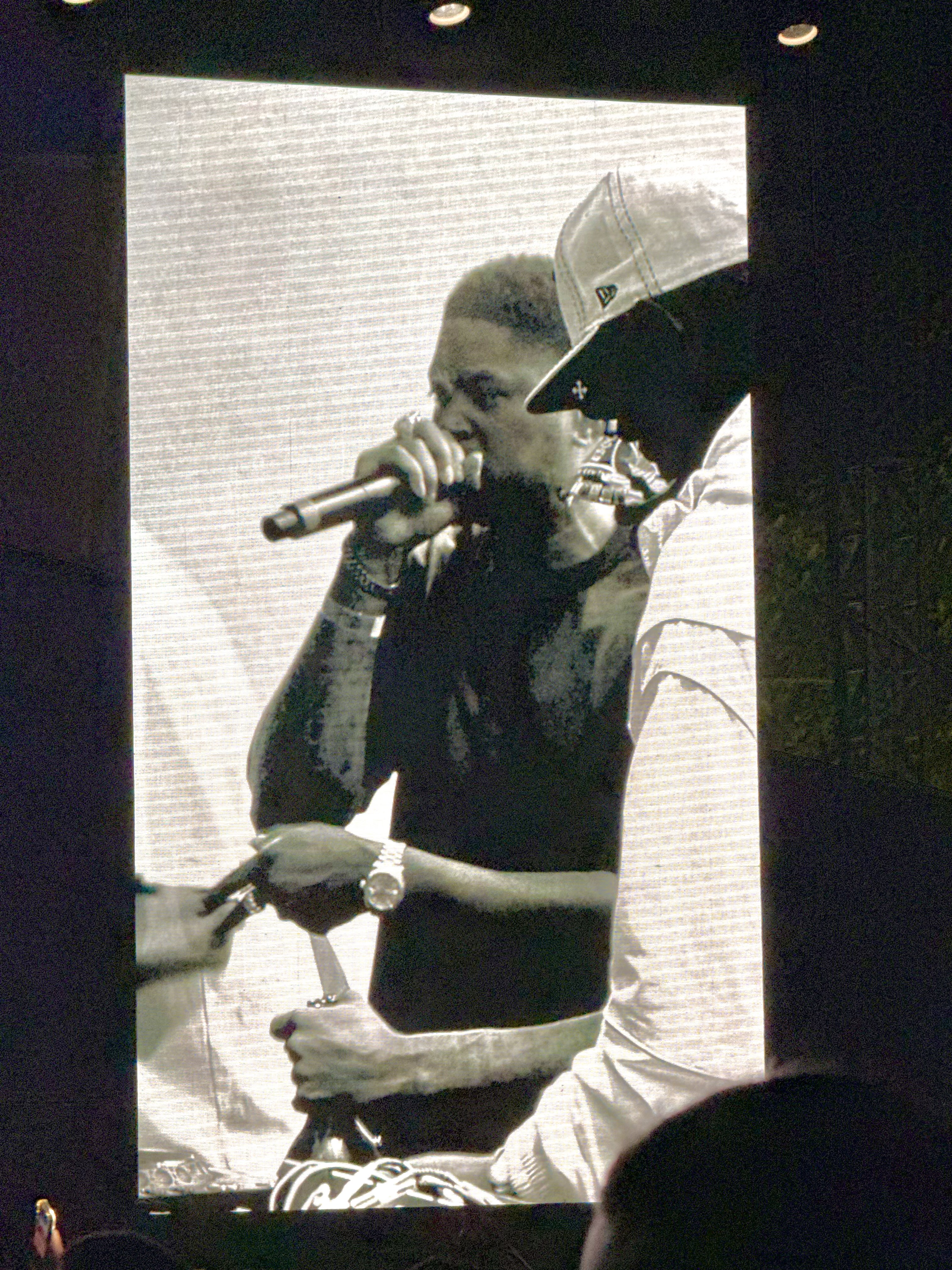

Background information
- Also known as: Big Fris
- Born: Deshane Cornwall; 18 July 1982 (age 43); Tottenham, London, England
- Genres: British hip hop; grime; UK garage; dancehall
- Occupations: Rapper; songwriter; record producer
- Years active: 2003–present
- Label: Boy Better Know

Deshane Cornwall (born 18 July 1982), known professionally as Frisco, is a British grime MC, rapper, songwriter and record producer who is part of the Boy Better Know (BBK) music label which includes Jme, Skepta, Jammer, among others. He has released three solo albums and a series of mixtapes (Back 2 da Lab mixtape series), guested on tracks by his label mates and established a successful monthly grime event in East London, contributing to the popularity of grime within the UK music scene.

== Early life ==
Frisco grew up in Tottenham, North London. He started MCing on pirate radio stations in North London in the early 2000s, with fellow artists and friends such as Skepta and Jme, with whom he formed BBK in 2006.

== Career ==
Frisco has been affiliated with TMT (consisting of Cell 22, Presto and Danny B). In 2004, he appeared in the video for "Private Caller", produced by Skepta. He then released the mixtapes Murda Music Volume 1 and Volume 2, before taking a year out to spend time with his son, which he referenced on subsequent mixtapes. He returned in 2006/7 with the mixtapes Back 2 da Lab volumes 1 and 2. A fifth mixtape, Peng Food, was released in 2008.

Back 2 da Lab Vol. 3 was released in 2009, which FactMag stated it "affirms his position as one of grime's most respected MCs."

Frisco's first album, Fully Grown (2010), was considered a disappointment by some critics for attempting to become too mainstream. It would be another four years until the release of his second album British Nights (2014), which he described as being more downtempo and 'introspective'.

In 2015, he set up the monthly live UK music night, The Den, at the Old Blue Last pub in Shoreditch, East London. He is currently CEO of The Den. He has also regularly performed at the Eskimo Dance Grime night, which is seen as one of the most important platforms for MCs within the movement.

As well as his own music production, he has gained positive reviews of his guest appearances on the releases of other BBK members, such as verses on "Detox" on Skepta's album Konnichiwa, and on "Don't @ Me" and "Amen" from Jme's album Integrity. 2015 also saw Drake becoming involved with BBK, reportedly posting images of an SBTV cypher between Skepta and Frisco from 2009 on his Instagram account.

In 2016, Frisco released the LP System Killer. Explaining the title, he told an interviewer that “It’s a rebellious statement to say I’m not part of the system. Whatever facade you have over what an artist is meant to be, I’m going to kill whatever idea you have of that.”

In 2018, BBK collectively won the award for innovation at the 2018 NME awards. In May, Frisco appeared on the track "Athlete" with other members of BBK and Goldie1.

Frisco released Back 2 da Lab Vol. 5 in July 2018. In November, he appeared on the track "Sekky" by Capo Lee.

== Discography ==
=== Albums ===
- 2010: Fully Grown
- 2016: System Killer
- 2020: The Familiar Stranger

=== EPs ===
- 2010: Have That
- 2011: Tear Drops EP
- 2014: British Nights
- 2021: Norf Face (with Jme, Shorty and Capo Lee)
- 2022: Tottenham EP
- 2023: Winning Team (with INFAMOUSIZAK)

=== Mixtapes ===
- 2006: Back 2 da Lab Vol. 1
- 2007: Back 2 da Lab Vol. 2
- 2007: Peng Food
- 2009: Back 2 da Lab Vol. 3
- 2011: Back 2 da Lab Compilation
- 2012: Back 2 da Lab Vol. 4
- 2018: Back 2 da Lab Vol. 5

=== Remixes ===
- 2010: Eyes on You (Remixes)
- 2011: Ghost Train (Remixes)
- 2011: Shutdown (Remixes)
