= Shutdown (Skepta song) =

Single by Skepta

from the album Konnichiwa
- Released: 26 April 2015
- Genre: Grime
- Length: 3:08 (Single version); 2:50 (Video edit)
- Label: Boy Better Know
- Songwriter(s): Joseph Adenuga; Idris Elba; Daniel Mukungu
- Producer(s): Ragz Originale; Skepta

Skepta singles chronology
"Red Eye to Paris" (2015)	"Shutdown" (2015)	"50 Grand" (2015)

Music video
- "Shutdown" on YouTube

"Shutdown" is a song by English rapper Skepta, released as the second single from his fourth album Konnichiwa (2016) on 26 April 2015 through his Boy Better Know record label. A music video for the song was uploaded to YouTube on the day of the song's release. "Shutdown" peaked at number 39 on the UK Singles Chart. The song samples speech from a Vine video created by Canadian rapper Drake. The song was covered by English rock band Slaves (now Soft Play) in the BBC Radio 1 Live Lounge and has since been included in the band's live setlists. The track is featured in NBA 2K17, Tony Hawk's Pro Skater 1 + 2 and Watch Dogs: Legion.

== Music video ==
The official music video for the song, shot in the Barbican Estate and lasting two minutes and fifty seconds, was uploaded on 26 April 2015 to Skepta's Vevo channel on YouTube. It was directed by Grace Ladoja and produced by Skepta and Ragz Originale. It was the last music video aired on MTV Base UK before its closure on 31st March 2022.

== Chart performance ==
=== Weekly charts ===
Chart (2015)	Peak position
UK Indie (OCC)	3
UK Hip Hop/R&B (OCC)	9
UK Singles (OCC)	39

== Certifications ==
Certifications for "Shutdown"
Region	Certification	Certified units/sales
Denmark (IFPI Danmark)	Gold	45,000^{‡}
New Zealand (RMNZ)	Platinum	30,000^{‡}
United Kingdom (BPI)	Platinum	600,000^{‡}
^{‡} Sales+streaming figures based on certification alone.

== Release history ==
Region	Date	Label	Format
Worldwide	26 April 2015	Boy Better Know	Digital download
