= Energy (Stay Far Away) =

Single by Skepta and Wizkid
- Released: 20 June 2018
- Length: 3:19
- Label: Boy Better Know
- Songwriters: Joseph Adenuga; Ayodeji Ibrahim Balogun
- Producer: Sarz

Skepta singles chronology
"Pure Water" (2018)	"Energy (Stay Far Away)" (2018)	"Praise the Lord (Da Shine)" (2018)

Wizkid singles chronology
"For You" (2018)	"Energy (Stay Far Away)" (2018)	"Drogba (Joanna)" (2018)

Music video
- "Energy (Stay Far Away)" on YouTube

"Energy (Stay Far Away)" is a song by English grime artist Skepta and Nigerian musician Wizkid. It initially debuted at number 73 on the UK Singles Chart, but reached a peak of number 59 following the release of its music video in September. The song spent a total of 15 weeks on the UK Singles chart. It has been certified Platinum by the British Phonographic Industry (BPI).

== Critical reception ==
Pulse Nigeria called it a "groovy song which has a message for anyone with a negative vibe" and a "perfect anthem for clubs". HotNewHipHop called it an "underrated banger" and "just the record to seal Skepta's ambitious switch to the big stage".

== Music video ==
The music video for the song was directed by Meji Alabi and features Skepta and Wizkid partying on a beach in Lagos, Nigeria. It pays homage to Fela Kuti. The Fader magazine said the video was full of "palm trees, white beaches, beautiful people, and good vibes", while Hypebeast considered it to be flaunting Nigeria's "enticing culture".

== Charts ==
Chart (2018)	Peak position
UK Singles (OCC)	59
UK Hip Hop/R&B (OCC)	37

== Certifications ==
Region	Certification	Certified units/sales
New Zealand (RMNZ)	Gold	15,000^{‡}
United Kingdom (BPI)	Platinum	600,000^{‡}
^{‡} Sales+streaming figures based on certification alone.
