= Youmou & Ohana =

Japanese music duo

Youmou to Ohana (Japanese 羊毛とおはな) were a Japanese acoustic music duo produced by LD&K Records. The duo were guitarist "Wool" Youmou (real name Kazunori Ichikawa, born 26 July 1981) and singer "Flower" Ohana (real name Hana Chiba, 31 January 1979 - 8 April 2015). Their first album in 2007 was sold at Nagoya's Village Vanguard. Following the Great East Japan earthquake Youmou and Ohana's song 'Fuyu no Uta' was used in a TV commercial in Taiwan as a thank-you message by Interchange Association Japan (IAJ) for Taiwan's support after the earthquake. This led to a concert in Taipei.

== Discography ==
=== Albums ===
	Release date	Title
1st	6 November 2007	Live in Living'07
2nd	15 January 2008	Konnichiwa(こんにちは。)
3rd	22 July 2008	Live in Living'08
4th	28 July 2009	Live in Living'09
5th	15 December 2009	Docchi ni Shiyou Kana (どっちにしようかな)
6th	3 August 2010	Live in Living'10
7th	23 August 2011	Live in Living for Good Night
8th	25 October 2011	Tsukimisou (月見草)
9th	23 April 2013	Live in Living'13
10th	24 April 2015	Hajimemashite + 2 - compilation tracks (はじめまして。+2～入門編～)
11th	8 April 2016	Live in Church
