= Rolex Sweep =

Single by Skepta

from the album Microphone Champion
- Released: 15 September 2008
- Length: 2:37
- Label: Boy Better Know
- Songwriter(s): Skepta; Gareth Keane

Skepta singles chronology
"Rolex Sweep" (2008)	"Sunglasses at Night" (2009)

"Rolex Sweep" is a song by British grime artist Skepta. The song was released as a digital download on 15 September 2008 as the lead single from his second studio album Microphone Champion (2009). In September 2008, the song peaked at number 86 on the UK Singles Chart.

== Track listing ==
iTunes digital download
No.	Title	Length
1.	"Rolex Sweep" (Radio Edit)	2:37
2.	"Rolex Sweep" (Vandalism Edit)	2:49
3.	"Rolex Sweep" (Extended Mix)	5:31
4.	"Rolex Sweep" (Vandalism Remix)	5:25
5.	"Rolex Sweep" (Whelan & Di Scala Remix)	5:16
6.	"Rolex Sweep" (Jamie Duggan Meets Da Booda in Yer Face Mix)	4:24

== Chart performance ==
=== Weekly charts ===
Chart (2008)	Peak position
UK Singles (OCC)	86

== See also ==
- The second hand of most Rolex watches, like the second hand of any watch with a mechanical movement, moves in intervals measuring a fraction of a second, such that the second hand appears to "sweep". The second hand of a watch with a quartz movement, on the other hand, moves in one second intervals, such that the second hand "ticks". Although this feature is not unique to Rolex watches, some call it the "Rolex sweep". Rolex did at one time produce watches with quartz movements, so the second hand of some Rolex watches moves in one second intervals. Rolex also gave Skepta a free Rolex Submariner for the promotion.
