= Konnichiwa (Youmou & Ohana album) =

Studio album by Youmou & Ohana
- Released: 2008

Konnichiwa (Japanese: こんにちは。) is a 2008 album by Youmou & Ohana. The first track, "Falling", features the music of Corinne Bailey Rae.

== Track listing ==
1. Falling
2. Kaze ni fukarete (風に吹かれて)
3. Rararurararurara (ララルララルララ)
4. Yureru (揺れる)
5. Tenohira (手のひら)
6. Namioto (波音)
7. Wa (輪)
8. O mamori no uta (おまもりのうた)
