= Ladies Hit Squad (song) =

Single by Skepta featuring D Double E and ASAP Nast

from the album Konnichiwa
- Released: 14 February 2016
- Recorded: 2015
- Genre: UK Rap
- Length: 4:39 (album version); 3:40 (single version)
- Label: Boy Better Know
- Songwriters: Joseph Adenuga; Darren Dixon; Tariq Devega
- Producer: Skepta

Skepta singles chronology
"50 Grand" (2015)	"Ladies Hit Squad" (2016)	"Man" (2016)

ASAP Nast singles chronology
"Hella Hoes" (2014)	"Ladies Hit Squad" (2016)

D Double E singles chronology
"Be Like Me" (2012)	"Ladies Hit Squad" (2016)

"Ladies Hit Squad" is a song performed by English rapper Skepta featuring vocals from D Double E and ASAP Nast. It was released as the third single from Skepta's fourth album Konnichiwa (2016) on 14 February 2016 through Boy Better Know. The song peaked at number 89 on the UK Singles Chart and number 28 on the UK R&B Singles Chart. The song shares its name with a UK garage crew consisting of Wiley, DJ Target and Maxwell D, which was active around the beginning of the 21st century.

== Music video ==
A music video to accompany the release of "Ladies Hit Squad" was first released onto YouTube on 14 February 2016 at a total length of three minutes and fifty seconds.

== Track listing ==
Digital download
No.	Title	Length
1.	"Ladies Hit Squad" (featuring D Double E and ASAP Nast)	3:40

== Chart performance ==
Chart (2016)	Peak position
UK Singles (OCC)	89
UK Hip Hop/R&B (OCC)	28

== Release history ==
Region	Date	Format	Label
United Kingdom	14 February 2016	Digital download	Boy Better Know
