= Man (Skepta song) =

Single by Skepta

from the album Konnichiwa
- Released: 14 April 2016
- Recorded: 2015
- Genre: Grime
- Length: 3:34
- Label: Boy Better Know
- Songwriters: Joseph Adenuga; Josh Homme
- Producer: Skepta

Skepta singles chronology
"Ladies Hit Squad" (2016)	"Man" (2016)	"No Security" (2017)

"Man" is a song performed by English rapper Skepta. It was released as an instant grat single from Skepta's fourth album Konnichiwa (2016) on 14 April 2016 through Boy Better Know. The song peaked at number 34 on the UK Singles Chart and number 7 on the UK R&B Singles Chart. The song was written and produced by Joseph Adenuga. The song's main riff is sampled from the song "Regular John" by American stoner rock band Queens of the Stone Age. Pitchfork ranked it 77th on their 100 Best Songs of 2016 list.

The middle verse has been interpreted as a diss track against Dizzee Rascal.

== Music video ==
A music video to accompany the release of "Man" was first released onto YouTube on 1 May 2016 at a total length of three minutes and thirty-six seconds. Shot by the infamous RISKY ROADZ

== Track listing ==
Digital download
No.	Title	Length
1.	"Man"	3:34

== Chart performance ==
=== Weekly charts ===
Chart (2016)	Peak position
UK Singles (Official Charts)	34
UK Hip Hop/R&B (Official Charts)	7

== Certifications ==
Region	Certification	Certified units/sales
New Zealand (RMNZ)	Gold	15,000^{‡}
United Kingdom (BPI)	Gold	400,000^{‡}
^{‡} Sales+streaming figures based on certification alone.

== Release history ==
Region	Date	Format	Label
United Kingdom	14 April 2016	Digital download	Boy Better Know
