= D Double E =

British rapper

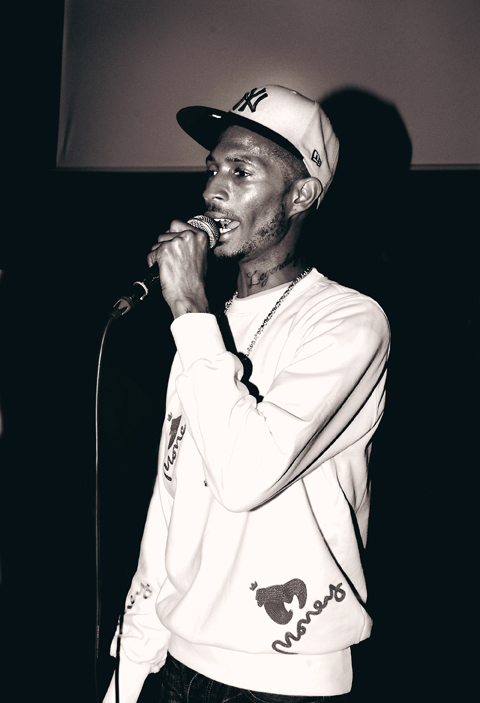
- D Double E in 2010

Background information
- Also known as: DJ Dan
- Born: Darren Jason Dixon; 18 January 1980 (age 46)
- Origin: Forest Gate, London, England
- Genres: Grime; UK garage; dubstep; jungle
- Occupations: MC; DJ; record producer
- Years active: 1990s–present
- Labels: Bluku Music; Dirtee Stank
- Member of: Newham Generals
- Formerly of: Bass Inject; Reckless Crew; M.A.D.; 187 Crew; Nasty Crew

Darren Jason Dixon (born 19 January 1980), known professionally as D Double E, is a British grime MC, DJ and record producer from Forest Gate, East London. He performs both as a solo artist and as a member of the grime duo Newham Generals.

== Career ==
D Double E has been active for over 20 years, beginning his career in jungle and UK garage music. In the mid-1990s, he was a DJ and went by the name DJ Dan. D Double was at the time in a crew called Bass Inject, alongside Terror Danjah and DJ Tempo. In 1998, Terror and D Double E went on to form the drum and bass collective the Reckless Crew which played sets on Rinse FM. RWD, He later formed M.A.D., short for Monkey, Alley and D Double E, and joined 187 Crew, alongside Hitman Hyper, Jammer, Leon B and Ebony J. After the disbandment of 187, he joined early grime collective N.A.S.T.Y Crew, until leaving after a dispute in December 2003. He then founded the group Newham Generals together with Monkstar and Footsie. The group remains active as a duo consisting of D Double E and Footsie. He and the Newham Generals signed to Dizzee Rascal's Dirtee Stank label.

As a solo artist, D Double E's releases include "Street Fighter Riddim", "Bluku, Bluku", "Bad 2 tha Bone", "Lovely Jubbly", and "Wolly". He is known for using vocalisations such as "bud-a-bup-bup" and "it's mree, mree". Fellow MC Skepta once named him as the "greatest of all time", and Dizzee Rascal said he was one of the artists who inspired him to start MCing.

IKEA invited D Double E to create a special soundtrack for a Christmas 2019 campaign, marking the first time the grime music genre was used in seasonal advertising.

== Personal life ==
D Double E is of Jamaican descent.

== Discography ==
=== Studio albums ===
List of albums, with selected chart positions
Title	Album details	Peak chart positions
Title	Album details	UK
Bluku Bluku	Released: 26 June 2011; Label: Dirtee Stank Recordings; Formats: CD, digital download	-
Jackuum!	Released: 31 August 2018; Label: Bluku Music; Formats: CD, digital download	61
Double or Nothing	Released: 23 October 2020; Label: Bluku Music; Formats: CD, LP, digital download	–
Bluku Bluku 2	Released: 1 July 2022; Label: Bluku Music; Formats: Digital download	-

=== Charted singles ===
Year	Title	Peak chart positions
Year	Title	UK
2004	"Pow! (Forward)" (Lethal Bizzle featuring Fumin, D Double E, Napper, Jamakabi, Neeko, Flowdan, Ozzie B, Forcer, and Demon)	11
2010	"Street Fighter Riddim"	145
2016	"Ladies Hit Squad" (Skepta featuring D Double E and ASAP Nast)	89
