= Hold On (Skepta song) =

Single by Skepta
- Released: 1 January 2012
- Recorded: 2011
- Genre: Electro-grime
- Length: 3:47 (original mix); 2:23 (radio edit)
- Label: 3 Beat; All Around the World
- Songwriter(s): J. Adenuga; Nick Atkinson; Sigurdur Sigtryggsson; Mustaq Uddi
- Producer(s): Mushtaq Omar Uddin; Siggi Sigtryggsson

Skepta singles chronology
"Amnesia" (2011)	"Hold On" (2012)	"Make Peace Not War" (2012)

"Hold On" is a song by British MC Skepta. It was released on 1 January 2012, as a digital download on iTunes in the United Kingdom. It was released as an EP for Skepta and didn't take part in any album features.

== Music video ==
A music video to accompany the release of "Hold On" was first released onto YouTube on 2 October 2011, at a total length of three minutes and fifteen seconds.

== Live performances ==
Skepta performed a live special acoustic version of the song when he visited The Wrap Up at MTV.

== Song Credits ==
"Hold on" samples a riff from the song "Jacuzzi Suzy" by the Icelandic rock band Brain Police. According to an interview with Jakob Frímann Magnússon, the head of the Icelandic music composers association, the riff was used without permission and Brain Police's label, Small Stone Records has their lawyer looking into the matter.

== Track listings ==
Digital download
No.	Title	Length
1.	"Hold On" (UK Radio Edit)	2:23
2.	"Hold On" (Original Mix)	3:47
3.	"Hold On" (Hi Def Radio Edit)	3:12
4.	"Hold On" (Hi Def Mix)	6:00
5.	"Hold On" (Vato Gonzalez Radio Edit)	3:20
6.	"Hold On" (Vato Gonzalez Mix)	5:45
7.	"Hold On" (Jacob Plant Radio Edit)	3:18
8.	"Hold On" (Jacob Plant Mix)	4:48
9.	"Hold On" (Fred V & Grafix Mix)	4:36

== Chart performance ==
=== Weekly charts ===
Chart (2012)	Peak position
Scotland (OCC)	35
UK Hip Hop/R&B (OCC)	9
UK Singles (OCC)	31

== Release history ==
Region	Date	Format	Label
United Kingdom	1 January 2012	Digital download	3 Beat, All Around the World
