= Make Peace Not War =

Single by Skepta
- Released: 13 May 2012
- Recorded: 2011
- Genre: Dance
- Length: 3:14
- Label: 3 Beat; All Around the World
- Songwriter(s): Skepta; Robert Clivillés; Freedom

Skepta singles chronology
"Hold On" (2012)	"Make Peace Not War" (2012)	"Get Busy" (2012)

"Make Peace Not War" is a song by British MC Skepta. It was released on 13 May 2012, as a digital download on iTunes in the United Kingdom. The song peaked at number 29 on the UK Singles Chart.

== Music video ==
A music video to accompany the release of "Make Peace Not War" was first released onto YouTube on 9 March 2012, at a total length of three minutes and twenty-eight seconds.

== Track listings ==
Digital download
No.	Title	Length
1.	"Make Peace Not War"	3:14
2.	"Make Peace Not War" (Extended Mix)	4:54
3.	"Make Peace Not War" (Blame Radio Edit)	3:27
4.	"Make Peace Not War" (Blame Mix)	5:04
5.	"Make Peace Not War" (Stinkahbell Radio Edit)	3:29
6.	"Make Peace Not War" (Stinkahbell Mix)	4:24
7.	"Make Peace Not War" (Calvertron Mix)	4:27

== Chart performance ==
=== Weekly charts ===
Chart (2012)	Peak position
Hungary (Rádiós Top 40)	31
Scotland (OCC)	35
UK Hip Hop/R&B (OCC)	8
UK Singles (OCC)	29

== Release history ==
Region	Date	Format	Label
United Kingdom	13 May 2012	Digital download	3 Beat, All Around the World
