= ASAP Bari =

American fashion designer and businessman (born 1991)

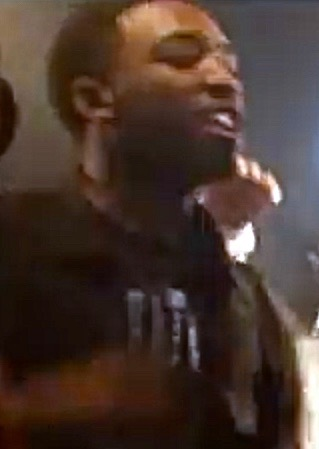
- Shelton in 2012
- Born: Jabari Shelton; December 23, 1991 (age 34); New York City, U.S.
- Other names: A$AP Bari; Young Lord
- Occupations: Designer; entrepreneur
- Years active: 2006–present
- Known for: Co-founder of ASAP Mob and VLONE

Jabari Shelton (born December 23, 1991), better known as ASAP Bari (stylized as A$AP Bari) or Young Lord, is an American fashion designer and entrepreneur. He is known as a co-founder of the New York hip-hop collective ASAP Mob, which he formed in 2006 alongside ASAP Yams, ASAP Kham, and ASAP Illz. He was also a co-founder of the streetwear clothing label Vlone, before being ousted in October 2022.

== Career ==
=== ASAP Mob ===
In 2006, Shelton founded the rap collective ASAP Mob alongside ASAP Yams, ASAP Kham, and ASAP Illz. Shelton does not contribute to the Mob as a musical artist (rap or produce) but handles the creative functions and networks with other individuals for the collective. Shelton was the one who allegedly introduced rapper ASAP Rocky to ASAP Yams. While establishing himself, his influences in the rap industry were Sean Combs and Dame Dash, two fellow Harlemites.

=== Vlone ===
Following the success of various ASAP Mob members (most notably Rocky), Shelton and fellow member Kamoni Chandler, known as ASAP K, co-founded the streetwear label, Vlone, in late 2011. Vlone hoodies and shirts quickly became famous in the streets of Harlem. Shelton, who had previously been the head of ASAP Rocky's merchandise during his tours, worked with Chandler on the brand. After a falling out, Chandler left the brand, and Shelton took over. Shelton brought in Edison Chen of CLOT, who handles the design work of the label. He stated in an interview with Mass Appeal that much of his influence came from trying on and stealing clothes with his friends while living in Harlem, feeling the fabrics of high-value brands. Vlone is more than just a brand, it is a style and culture which means "You live alone and you die alone".

In 2014, Vlone debuted its first collection. Vlone encountered a partnership with Nike in 2017; On July 31, a Nike spokesman confirmed that the Vlone deal with Shelton was terminated following the release of a video of him sexually assaulting a woman in a hotel room.

In June 2017, Vlone participated in its first runway show during the 2017 Paris Fashion Week.

In 2020, Vlone started collaborating with artists, pushing out merchandise for Juice Wrld, YoungBoy Never Broke Again, the Weeknd, Nav, Pop Smoke, and more artists.

On October 8, 2022, citing issues with Bari's discrepancies against several affiliates of the ASAP Mob, attempting to take over the brand for himself, and five years of ignoring his sexual assault scandal, Vlone announced that he had been fired from the company. In a confirmation via Instagram, they stated that they would not partake in "any irrational behavior associated or related with Jabari 'Younglord' Shelton. He has no authority to style himself as 'Mr. Vlone,' use or license Vlone – this behavior is contrary to our collective."

== Recognition ==
In 2012, he was listed in Complex's 25 Under 25: The Young Leaders of Style article for his streetwear style contributions. In 2017, Vlone, Shelton's former clothing brand, was showcased at a runway show in Paris.

== Controversy ==
=== Ian Connor ===
Following rape allegations surrounding stylist and model Ian Connor, on June 23, 2016, Shelton punched Connor as he was leaving the Colette store in Paris, with Shelton further confronting Connor on Twitter surrounding the allegation, and later it escalated to Connor fighting Shelton.

=== 2017 sexual assault case ===
On July 12, 2017, a video emerged alleging sexual assault by Shelton against a nude woman. The video showed Shelton bursting into a hotel room she was sleeping in, yelling, "You fucked my assistant, now you are going to fuck with me", followed up by, "You better suck my cock now, bitch!" She said "no", and then Shelton pulled blankets and exposed her nude body to about 10 other men of ASAP Mob, and he followed her into the bathroom. She begged him to stop harassing her and began crying in fear. She was then allegedly thrown out of the room in the nude with Bari smacking her in the buttocks; she had the hotel manager call the police. Shelton claimed on Twitter that the video was "fake", though he later stated that the video was between "friends" and that they had "resolved this issue amicably among all parties as adults".

In November 2017, the woman sued Shelton for over $1 million, stating she was sexually assaulted by him. However, the case was later dismissed as she decided to not proceed further with the investigation.

On May 18, 2018, Shelton was arrested at Heathrow Airport in London on charges of sexual assault related to the incident. On January 3, 2019, Shelton pleaded guilty to the 2017 sexual assault in London. He avoided a possible prison sentence by paying the victim £2,000.
