= Jme =

British grime MC (born 1985)

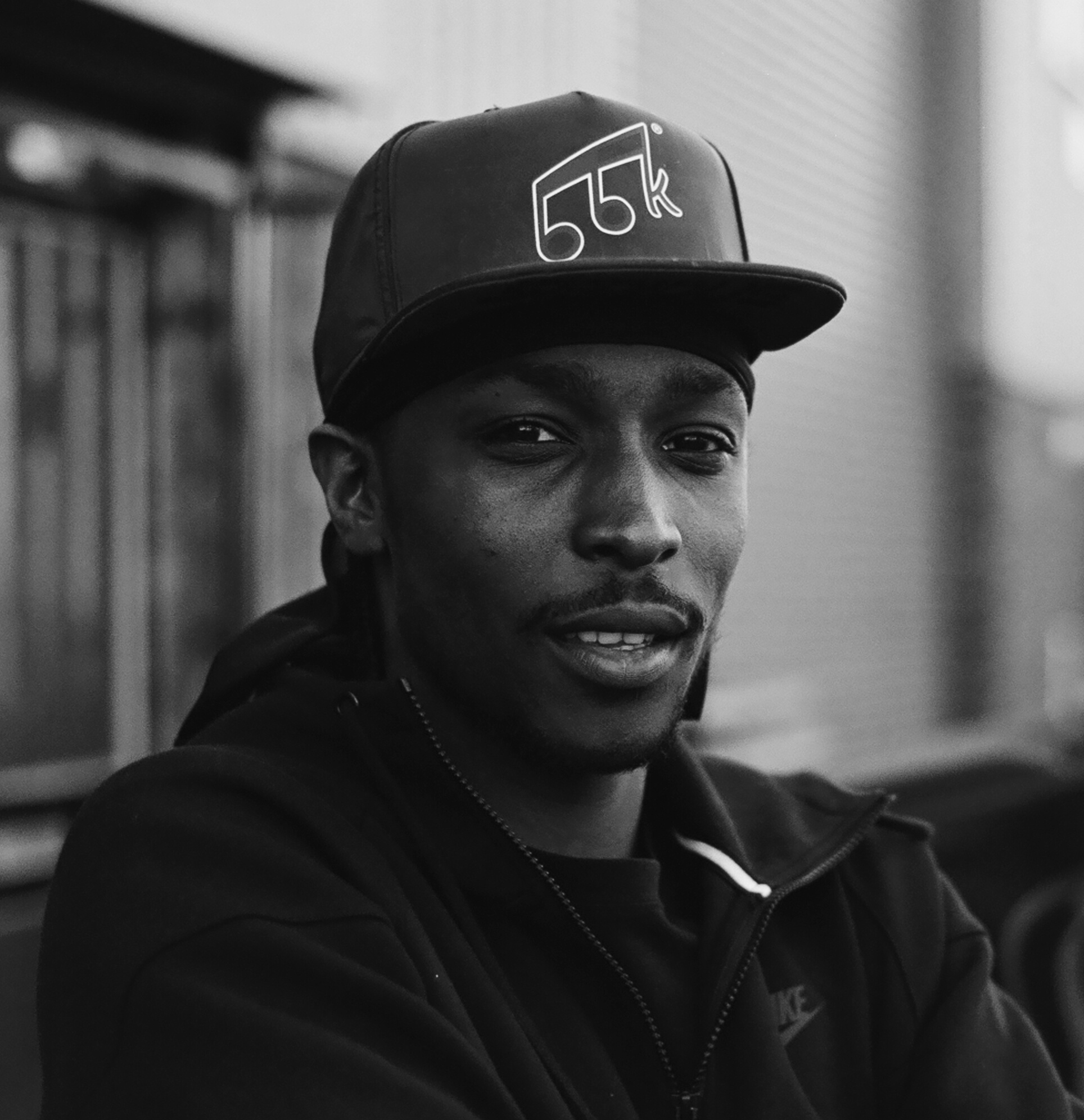
- Jme in 2015
- Born: Jamie Adenuga; 4 May 1985 (age 41); Hackney, London, England
- Education: University of Greenwich
- Occupations: MC; songwriter; record producer; rapper; disc jockey; Influencer
- Years active: 2003–present
- Spouse: Sarah Cavanagh (m. 2016)
- Children: 2
- Relatives: Julie Adenuga (sister); Skepta (brother)
- Musical career
- Genre: Grime
- Label: Boy Better Know

Jamie Adenuga (born 4 May 1985), known professionally as Jme, is an British grime MC, songwriter, record producer, rapper and DJ. He is the co-founder of the crew and label Boy Better Know. He also serves as a sole owner and director of an associated company, Boy Better Know Limited, which he incorporated in 2008. He was previously part of the grime collective Meridian Crew and later Roll Deep alongside his older brother, Skepta. Adenuga grew up in Tottenham, North London. He released his debut album Famous?.

== Early life ==
Jamie Adenuga was born on the 4th of May 1985 in Hackney, London to Nigerian parents with his mother being of Igbo and father being of Yoruba heritage respectively. His mother moved to England during the Nigerian Civil War, as recounted in her 2020 memoir Endless Fortune. He grew up in Tottenham, North London where he lived in a council house and attended St. Paul's and All Hallows' School and later Winchmore School in Winchmore Hill, Enfield along with his younger brother Jason, elder brother Joseph and sister Julie. Adenuga subsequently graduated from the University of Greenwich having studied 3D digital design.

== Career ==
He started out producing by making mobile phone ringtones. He later used Mario Paint and Game Boy Camera. In his song "96 Bars of Revenge" Adenuga also references himself using Fruity Loops, Pro Tools and Logic Studio. Adenuga also co-owns his own T-shirt chain, bearing the labels of himself, his record label Boy Better Know, and his dormant nightclub Straight Outta Bethnal. He released his debut album Famous? and an album through a major label with the whole of Boy Better Know.

In October 2008, he became one of a small number of unsigned artists to headline at the London Astoria.

Jme released a single, "Over Me", in September 2009. He followed this single with another, "Sidetracked", which featured Wiley, followed by "CD is Dead", which featured Tempa T. These three singles are featured on the album, Blam!, which was released on 4 October 2010.

On 13 February 2011, Jme released a compilation album entitled History: which peaked at 162 on the UK Albums Chart.

In January 2012, Jme released a single, "96 Fuckries", which entered the chart at number 41.

Jme's third studio album, Integrity>, was released on 4 May 2015. It entered the UK Albums Chart at number twelve. It was one of nineteen records nominated for the IMPALA Album of the Year Award.

During 2019, Jme entered an eleven-month hiatus from social media. On 14 November 2019, Jme announced the release of his fourth studio album, Grime MC, which was released on 29 November 2019. The album was released exclusively on CD and vinyl during its initial release. Grime MC was positively received by Clash, which gave it 8/10, while Pitchfork called it "the strongest record of his career".

== Personal life ==
Adenuga is a vegan and teetotaler. Adenuga is the brother of Beats 1 DJ and radio host Julie Adenuga, fellow grime artist Skepta, and graphic designer and producer Jason.

Jme married Sarah Cavanagh, his longtime girlfriend, in August 2016. Their daughter, Rose, was born in May 2018. In September 2023, the couple welcomed their second daughter, Remy.

While campaigning for the 2017 UK general election, Labour Party leader Jeremy Corbyn met with Jme to encourage people to register to vote, with Jme saying, "I'm on Jeremy's Snapchat to make sure you register to vote."

Jme is also known for his involvement with the Sidemen, a British YouTube collective consisting of six YouTube personalities, and has appeared in their YouTube videos. He participated in the first six Sidemen charity football matches between 2016 and 2025. He featured on the group's song "Christmas Drillings".

== Discography ==
=== Studio albums ===
Title	Details	Peak chart positions	Certifications
Title	Details	UK	Certifications
Famous?	Released: 14 July 2008; Label: Boy Better Know; Formats: CD, digital download	—	
Blam!	Released: 4 October 2010; Label: Boy Better Know; Formats: CD, digital download	66	
Integrity>	Released: 4 May 2015; Label: Boy Better Know; Formats: CD, LP, digital download	12	BPI: Gold
Grime MC	Released: 29 November 2019; Label: Boy Better Know; Formats: CD, LP, digital download	26	

=== Collaborative albums ===
Title	Album details	Peak chart positions
Title	Album details	UK
Norf Face (with Capo Lee, Frisco and Shorty)	Released: 5 March 2021; Label: Norf Face; Formats: Digital download, streaming	–

=== Compilation albums ===
Title	Album details	Peak chart positions
Title	Album details	UK
History:	Released: 13 February 2011; Label: Boy Better Know; Formats: CD, Digital download	162

=== Mixtapes ===
- 2006: Boy Better Know – Edition 1: Shh Hut Yuh Muh
- 2006: Boy Better Know – Edition 2: Poomplex
- 2006: Boy Better Know – Edition 3: Derkhead
- 2006: Boy Better Know – Edition 4: Tropical (Instrumental mixtape)
- 2011: Boy Better Know – Tropical 2 (Instrumental mixtape)
- 2015: Jme – 48 Hour Mixtape (Free Stream)

=== Vinyl ===
- Jme – Badderman EP
- Jme – Calm Down
- Jme – Don't Chat
- Jme – The Jme EP – Rice and Peas
- Jme – Joel Shut Your Mouth
- Jme – Meridian Walk
- Jme – Serious/Calm Down EP
- Jme – Serious Serious EP
- Jme – Waste Man EP
- Commodo ft. JME- Shift
- Jme/Grime Reaper – Safe and Sound EP
- Jme/Skepta – Adamantium EP
- Jme/Trigz – Berr Quick EP
- Jme/Trigz – The Nu EP
- Jme – Integrity>
- Jme – Integrity> Instrumental
- Jme – Grime MC
- Jme - Five Stars (Stylized as ☆☆☆☆☆)**

=== Singles ===
==== As lead artist ====
Title	Year	Peak chart positions		Certifications	Album
Title	Year	UK	UK Indie	Certifications	Album
"Over Me"	2009	—	—		Blam!
"Sidetracked" (featuring Wiley)	2010	—	14		Blam!
"CD Is Dead" (featuring Tempa T)	2010	—	15		Blam!
"Jme"	2011	—	—		Blam!
"96 F**Kries"	2012	41	3	BPI: Silver	Integrity>
"Murking"	2012	90	5		Non-album singles
"Banger" (featuring Wiley)	2013	—	5		Non-album singles
"If You Don't Know"	2013	97	10		Non-album singles
"Work"	2013	133	16		Integrity>
"Integrity"	2013	82	9		Integrity>
"T.R.O.N"	2013	—	—		Non-album single
"Taking Over? (It Ain't Working)"	2014	—	15		Integrity>
"Man Don't Care" (featuring Giggs)	2015	100	10	BPI: Platinum	Integrity>
"Issmad"	2020	—	—		Grime MC
"96 of My Life"	2020	—	—		Grime MC
"—" denotes single that did not chart or were not released in that territory.

==== As featured artist ====
Title	Year	Peak chart positions		Certifications	Album
Title	Year	UK	UK R&B	Certifications	Album
"Maybe Ting Refix" (Ozzie B featuring Lip E, Double S, Shocka, Flirta D, Lethal Bizzle, Jme and Frisco)	2010	—	—		Non-album single
"Radio" (Ed Sheeran featuring Jme)	2011	—	—		No.5 Collaborations Project
"Pow 2011" (Lethal Bizzle featuring Jme, Wiley, Chipmunk, Face, P Money, Ghetts and Kano)	2011	33	10		Best of Bizzle
"Can You Hear Me? (Ayayaya)" (Wiley featuring Skepta, Jme and Ms D)	2012	3	—	BPI: Platinum	The Ascent
"German Whip" (Meridian Dan featuring Big H and Jme)	2014	13	—		I Am London
"That's Not Me" (Skepta featuring Jme)	2014	21	—	BPI: 2× Platinum	Konnichiwa
"Rari WorkOut" (Lethal Bizzle featuring Tempa T and Jme)	2014	11	2	BPI: Silver	Non-album single
"Keep Up" (KSI featuring Jme)	2015	45	7		Keep Up
"Say Nada" (Shakka featuring Jme)	2015	75	10	BPI: Silver	The Lost Boys
"House & Pop" (President T featuring Jme)	2016	—	—		T on the Wing
"Box" (Lethal Bizzle featuring Jme and Face)	2016	—	—		Non-album single
"Style & Flows" (Double S featuring Jme)	2016	—	—		The Intent soundtrack
"Running Wild" (Goldie 1 featuring Jme)	2016	—	—		Non-album singles
"My Yard" (Bossman Birdie featuring Jme)	2016	—	—		Non-album singles
"Gone Mad" (Blay Vision featuring Jme)	2017	—	—		Turner Avenue
"Off to Work" (Dapz On The Map featuring Jme)	2018	—	—		Champion Settings
"Born on Your Own" (Maxsta featuring Jme)	2018	—	—		Maxtape 2
"Fall Off" (Big Zuu featuring Jme)	2018	—	—		Content with Content
"Angles" (Miraa May featuring Jme)	2019	—	—		Dark
"Pull Up" (KSI featuring Jme)	2019	94	—		New Age
"Icey" (Ironik featuring Jme)	2019	—	—		Non-album single
"Red Card" (Frisco featuring Skepta, Jammer and Jme)	2020	58	—		The Familiar Stranger
"Don't Know About You" (B Live featuring Becky Hill and Jme)	2021	—	—		Non-album singles
"Christmas Drillings" (Sidemen featuring Jme)	2022	3	—		Non-album singles
"What You Know About That" (Dizzee Rascal featuring Jme and D Double E)	2024	—	—		Don't Take It Personal
"New Era" (House of Pharaohs featuring Jme)	2024	—	—		Non-album singles
"Know Me Better" (Vikkstar and Masked Wolf featuring Jme)	2024	—	—		Non-album singles
"—" denotes single that did not chart or were not released in that territory.

=== Guest appearances ===
Title	Year	Other artist(s)	Album
"Level Up"	2012	Sway	Non-album singles
"Man's Not Hot (MC Mix)"	2017	Big Shaq, Lethal Bizzle, Chip, Krept & Konan	Non-album singles
"Right Now"	2018	Chip, Frisco	Ten10
"Player One"	2019	P Money, KSI	Money Over Everyone III
"Night Time (Remix)"	2020	Master Peace, Sophie DeMasi	Non-album single
"Egyptian Cotton"	2022	Example, Local, Westneat	We May Grow Old But We Never Grow Up

== Filmography ==
Film
Year	Title	Role	Notes	Ref.
2023	The Naughty List	Big Nick	Short Film	
2024	The Sidemen Story	Himself	Documentary	

Television roles
Year	Title	Role	Notes	Ref.
2017	Carnage	JME	Television Film	
2025	Inside	JME	Reality Show	
