= Jammer (musician) =

British grime MC and producer

- Also known as: Murkle Man
- Born: Jahmek Levi Selassie Power; 30 June 1982 (age 43); London, England
- Genres: Grime; UK garage
- Occupations: MC; rapper; songwriter; record producer
- Years active: 2000–present
- Labels: Boy Better Know; Jahmek the World Productions; Big Dada
- Member of: Boy Better Know; MAJ!C
- Formerly of: Nasty Crew; Neckle Camp; Slew Dem

Jahmek Levi Selassie Power (born 30 June 1982), better known by his stage name Jammer, is a British grime MC, DJ, songwriter and record producer, known for being a member of Boy Better Know and a former member of N.A.S.T.Y Crew. Jammer also runs Lord of the Mics, a grime clash series released on DVD and well known in grime.

== Biography ==
Jammer was a member of the East London group N.A.S.T.Y Crew from 2000, and released a single under his own name, "Take U Out", in 2003 before departing from the group. He signed with Big Dada Recordings and released his first full-length, Jahmanji, in May 2010. In 2014, Jammer released what was meant to be his first album entitled "Top Producer" for free, in which all the tracks were recorded between 2004–2006. Jammer is a supporter of Arsenal F.C. He is the co-founder of house music record label Mas Tiempo, along with Skepta. In 2025, he formed the electronic music supergroup MAJ!C with fellow DJs Maya Jane Coles, Alex Jones and Chloe Robinson, with their first shows including Glastonbury Festival and fabric.

== Lord of the Mics ==
Jammer created the influential grime DVD series in his basement. During a cursing match with one of his friends, he envisioned the set up in his basement to be perfect for hosting clashes. This series skyrocketed in popularity following the famous clashes of Lord of the Mics 1 between Wiley and Kano, and Lord of the Mics 2 between Skepta and Devilman.

== Discography ==
=== Albums ===
- Jahmanji (Big Dada, 2010)
- Living the Dream (Jahmek the World Productions, 2013)
- Top Producer (Jahmek the World Productions, 2014)
- Natural Selection (2020)

=== Mixtapes ===
- Are You Dumb? Vol. 1 (2006)
- Are You Dumb? Vol. 2 (2007)
- Are You Dumb? Vol. 3 (2008)
- Are You Dumb? Vol. 4 (2009)
- Are You Dumb? Vol. 5 (2018)
