= Skepta =

English rapper, producer and DJ (born 1982)

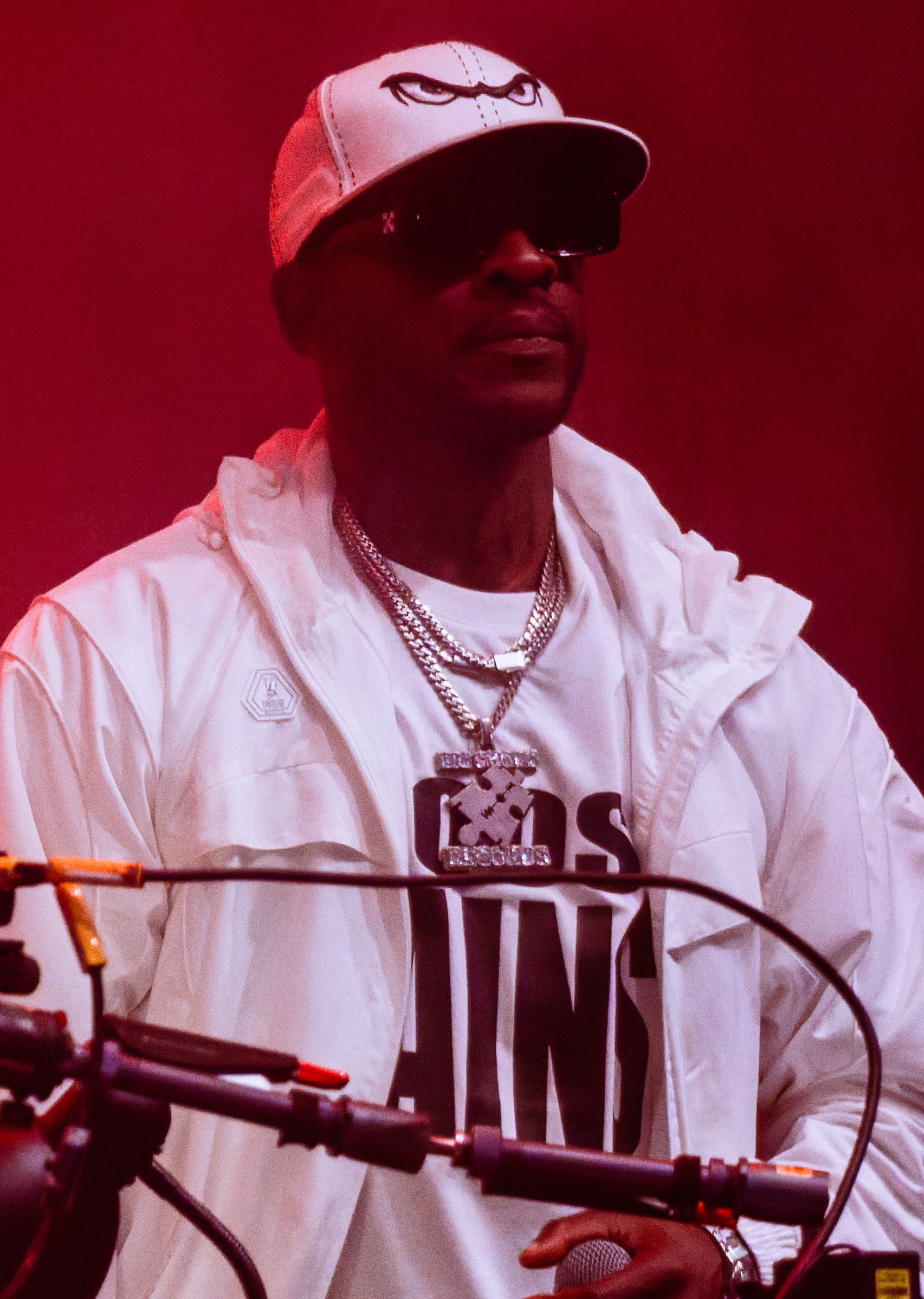
- Skepta performing in 2025
- Born: Joseph Olaitan Adenuga Jr. 19 September 1982 (age 44); London, England
- Other names: Big smoke; Skeppy; Moschino Joe
- Occupations: Rapper, DJ
- Years active: 2002–present
- Children: 2
- Relatives: Jme (brother); Julie Adenuga (sister); Jason Adenuga (brother); Toby Richardson (DJ/Producer)
- Musical career
- Genres: British hip-hop; grime
- Labels: Boy Better Know; The Orchard; All Around the World; Island
- Website: bigsmokecorporation.com/skepta

Joseph Olaitan Adenuga Jr (born 19 September 1982), known professionally as Skepta, is a British grime music MC, rapper, record producer, fashion designer, film director and DJ. Alongside his younger brother Jme, he briefly joined Roll Deep before founding Boy Better Know in 2005. With Boy Better Know, Skepta clashed with fellow Grime MC Devilman for the video release Lord of the Mics 2, in what is remembered as one of the biggest clashes in grime history.

Skepta released his debut studio album Greatest Hits in 2007 and his second album, Microphone Champion in 2009, both independently; while his third studio album Doin' It Again was released in 2011 by AATW. He made his debut in the 2015 film Anti-Social. Skepta's fourth studio album, Konnichiwa (2016), featured the hit singles "That's Not Me" and "Shutdown". The album, which was widely acclaimed, won the Mercury Prize.

In 2018, he produced and was featured on American rapper ASAP Rocky's single "Praise the Lord (Da Shine)", which became both artists' highest-charting single and a global hit. In 2019, Skepta released Ignorance Is Bliss, which charted in fifteen countries. Insomnia (2020), a collaborative album with British rappers Chip and Young Adz, became Skepta's third album to reach the top 10 of the UK Albums Chart.

Skepta has been nominated for three Brit Awards, including the Brit Award for British Male Solo Artist. His influence on contemporary British popular culture as a key figure in the grime scene saw him appear on Debrett's 2017 list of the most influential people in the UK.

== Early life ==
Joseph Olaitan Adenuga Jr. was born on 19 September 1982, to Nigerian parents, of respective Yoruba (paternal) and Igbo (maternal) backgrounds. Skepta grew up in Winchmore Hill, North London and went to the Winchmore School. He is the eldest of four children; fellow musician Jme, radio presenter Julie and graphic designer Jason.

== Career ==
=== 2002–2007: Career beginnings and Greatest Hits ===
Skepta was originally a DJ from Tottenham-based grime collective Meridian Crew. The Meridian Crew performed 'sets' or sessions on pirate radio (most notably Heat FM 96.6) where fellow crew members sometimes referred to him as "Scoopa Daniels". Early in his career, Skepta released "Pulse Eskimo" in 2002, as well as instrumentals "DTI (Pirate Station Anthem)" and "Private Caller".

Skepta began MCing shortly before Meridian Crew disbanded in 2005, after which Skepta, alongside his brother Jme, joined Roll Deep for a short period of time before becoming founding members of Boy Better Know in 2006. Skepta was convinced to begin MCing by Wiley after his records were taken away from him by the police. Following the formation of Boy Better Know, Skepta clashed with fellow MC Devilman for the DVD Lord of the Mics 2, in what is remembered as one of the biggest clashes in grime history. Shortly after the clash, Skepta released a mixtape entitled "Joseph Junior Adenuga". Skepta publicly released his debut album Greatest Hits on 17 September 2007, on his label Boy Better Know.

=== 2008–2011: Microphone Champion and Doin' It Again ===
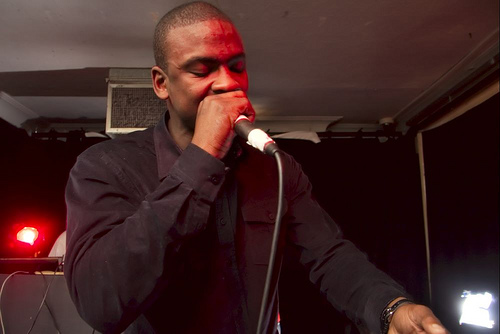
Skepta performing in 2011

Skepta self-released the first single "Rolex Sweep" in September 2008 and reached number 89 on the UK Singles Chart. Skepta then released the album Microphone Champion on 1 June 2009. He then also released single "Too Many Man" with Jme, Wiley, Frisco and Shorty, which went to chart at number 79. Skepta has released five singles off his third studio album Doin' It Again (first with a major label), titled "Bad Boy", "Rescue Me", "Cross My Heart" featuring Preeya Kalidas, "So Alive" and "Amnesia", as well as a video for the Hello Good Morning (Grime Remix). Three singles charted in the Top 40 of the UK Singles Chart, with "Rescue Me" being the most successful at number 14. "Cross My Heart" came in at number 31 and dropped out of the Top 40 a week later. Doin' It Again spent 3 weeks in the top 100 album charts and debuted and peaked at number 19 on its first week of release. In 2011, Skepta caused a controversy by releasing a hardcore music video of his single "All Over the House".

=== 2012–2017: Blacklisted and Konnichiwa ===
In 2012, Skepta released two singles from his fourth forthcoming album. Both "Hold On" and "Make Peace Not War" were Top 40 charting singles in the UK but were a departure from Skepta's usual sound. Skepta's second major label album was intended to be released in the fourth quarter of 2011, entitled The Honeymoon but was delayed till 2012. After a disappointing response from the first two singles Skepta decided to release a purchasable mixtape, titled Blacklisted. It was released on 2 December 2012 along with music videos to support the release prior to the release.

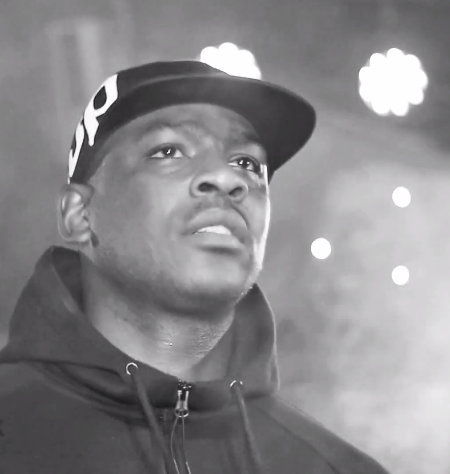
Skepta in 2014

In March 2014, Skepta provided a verse for the remix of "German Whip" by Meridian Dan, and in the same month, he released his new single, "That's Not Me", featuring his brother Jme, peaking at number 21 on the UK charts. The single's music video won the award for Best Video at the 2014 MOBO Awards. Upon receiving the award, Skepta stated that the video cost him £80. In late 2014, Skepta released another single titled "It Ain't Safe" featuring ASAP Bari. This was followed in early 2015 with "Shutdown", as well as features on "Red Eye to Paris" by Flatbush Zombies and the remix of "Ojuelegba" by Wizkid, also featuring Drake. Skepta and others joined Kanye West at a surprise show in London, performing numerous songs together during a shared set. He was also named one of GQ's 50 best dressed British men in 2015.

In an interview it stated that Skepta's making his acting debut in 2015 film Anti-Social, released initially in May. On 14 February 2016 Skepta released "Ladies Hit Squad" featuring grime artist D Double E and American rapper ASAP Nast, of the New York-based ASAP Mob. Through a post on Instagram, Skepta announced that his album, Konnichiwa was due to be released on 6 May 2016. Konnichiwa became Grime's highest-charting album, peaking at number 2 in the UK music charts. Konnichiwa features songs such as "That's Not Me", "Shutdown" and "Man". The release of Konnichiwa was celebrated with a launch party on 5 May 2016 held in Tokyo and live streamed on Boiler Room, featuring a live performance of the entire album by Skepta and supporting performances from Japanese trap artists Kohh, Dutch Montana, Loota, and DJ Riki.

Skepta began his "Banned From America" two-part, 14-show tour on 16 April 2017 at the Coachella Valley Music and Arts Festival, which covered cities throughout the United States and Europe. The tour was named as such in reference to Skepta's forced cancellation of his 2016 "No Fear" American tour in support of Konnichiwa, when his application for a visa to enter the United States was denied.

Skepta released his Vicious EP on 31 October 2017, with songs featuring ASAP Rocky, Lil B, and Section Boyz. In the summer of 2017, rumours on the underground dance scene suggested an imminent collaboration between Skepta and drum'n'bass pioneer Goldie. This was confirmed in Goldie's 2017 memoir All Things Remembered, which refers to him having done a track with Skepta. It has not yet been released.

=== 2018–2025: Ignorance Is Bliss, All In and collaborations ===
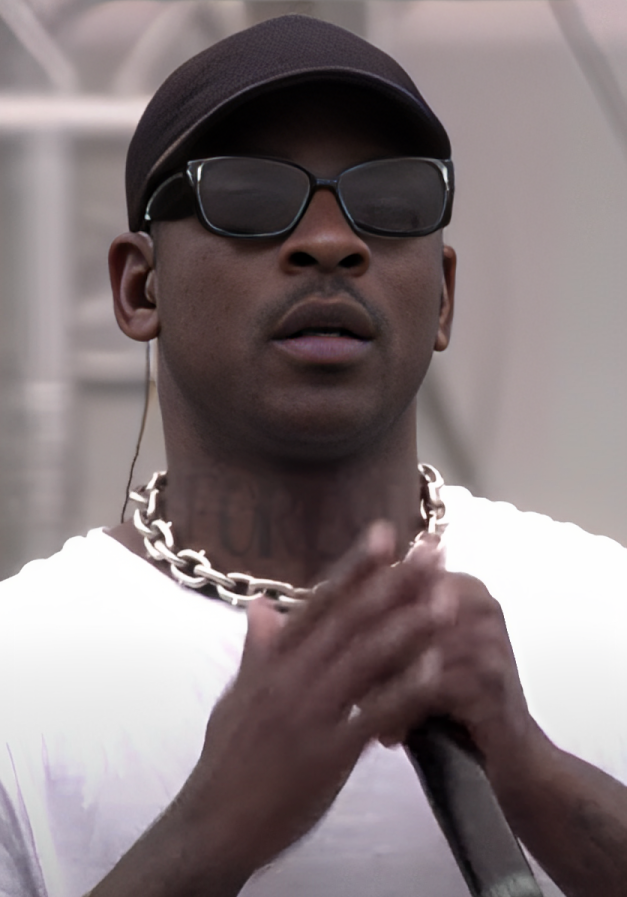
Skepta performing in 2019

Skepta featured on ASAP Rocky's "Praise the Lord (Da Shine)", which was released in May 2018. The single charted on the Billboard Hot 100. Also in May, Skepta released his single "Pure Water", which peaked at number 78 in the UK. He followed this in June with "Energy (Stay Far Away)" with Wizkid, which reached number 59. In 2020, Skepta appeared alongside Pop Smoke on Kid Cudi’s song “Show Out” from Cudi’s album Man on the Moon III: The Chosen. In December 2019, Skepta also appeared as himself in a Grand Theft Auto Online expansion as a radio host with Danny Brown. Brown also lent his voice to another fictional character in the game. He also collaborated with Gorillaz and Tony Allen on the song "How Far?" in May 2020.

On 30 July 2021, Skepta released his EP, All In.

In 2022, Skepta signed with Wasserman Music for worldwide representation.

In October 2023, Skepta released "Can't Play Myself (A Tribute to Amy)", which samples Amy Winehouse's "Tears Dry on Their Own". The single peaked at number 28 on the UK Singles Chart.

In January 2024, he apologised after artwork for his upcoming single, "Gas Me Up (Diligent)", received criticism online for bearing "unintentional but palpable allusions" to the Holocaust; the pictures in question depicted images from 1980s skinhead culture. In his apology, Skepta emphasised the unintended parallels, but vowed "to be more mindful going forward".

In March 2025, Skepta featured on Playboi Carti's album Music, on the song "Toxic". In October 2025, he collaborated with Finessekid on the single "Sirens (From Ireland)"; the single peaked at number 66 on the UK Singles Chart.

=== 2026: The Fork and Knife ===
In August 2026, Skepta appeared at that year's Reading Music Festival, where he performed songs from his forthcoming sixth studio album, The Fork and Knife.

On 29 May 2026, he appeared on "Chippie", a single by French-Malian singer Aya Nakamura. On 31 July 2026, he appeared on a remix of "Gut Genug" by KitschKrieg and Blumengarten. On 18 September 2026, he released the single "Innocent Smile", in collaboration with Suggs and Chase & Status.

== Legal issues ==
In 2009, Skepta was convicted of common assault in London and fined over assault occasioning actual bodily harm in Cyprus in 2006, which he said occurred after a large group of men racially abused him and his friends and a fight broke out.

In January 2016, Skepta punched a man in the mouth after an altercation at a Melbourne nightclub and pleaded guilty to recklessly causing injury. No conviction was recorded, but he was fined $2,500 and ordered to pay $10,000 to the victim.

In 2016 Skepta was denied entry into the US and banned from getting a visa for past criminal record.

Skepta was charged with driving with THC in his system on 14 May 2024, in High Wycombe.

== Personal life ==
On 4 April 2018, Skepta was installed as a chief in his Nigerian hometown in Ogun State, receiving the Yoruba chieftaincy title of the Amuludun ("Chief Entertainer") of Odo-Aje.

Skepta has two children, a daughter and a son.

He is also a visual artist: in September 2022, Sotheby's put on display some of his paintings, all of which had been created during the COVID-19 lockdowns, for the "Contemporary Curated" art series.

On 2 December 2024, he hosted a DJ set at Jaguar's launch event for the Type 00 concept car at the Art Week in Miami, Florida.

Skepta supports the English Premier League club Tottenham Hotspur. He has also participated in high-profile charity/creator football events, such as lining up for England in the Eleven All Stars match at the Parc des Princes alongside his brother JME.

== Discography ==
Studio albums

- Greatest Hits (2007)
- Microphone Champion (2009)
- Doin' It Again (2011)
- Konnichiwa (2016)
- Ignorance Is Bliss (2019)
- The Fork and Knife (2026)

Collaborative albums

- Insomnia (with Chip and Young Adz) (2020)

== Awards and nominations ==
Year	Award	Category	Recipients and nominees	Result
2011	BET Awards	Best International Act: UK	Skepta	Nominated
2014	MOBO Awards	Best Video	"That's Not Me" (feat. Jme)	Won
2015	MOBO Awards	Best Song	"Shutdown"	Won
2016	Ivor Novello Awards	Best Contemporary Song	"Shutdown"	Nominated
2016	Ivor Novello Awards	Songwriter of the Year	n/a	Won
2016	Q Awards	Best Track	"Man"	Nominated
2016	Q Awards	Best Solo Artist	Skepta	Nominated
2016	Mercury Prize	Album of the Year	Konnichiwa	Won
2016	MOBO Awards	Best Album	Konnichiwa	Nominated
2016	MOBO Awards	Best Grime Act	Skepta	Nominated
2016	MOBO Awards	Best Male Act	Skepta	Nominated
2016	BET Awards	Best International Act: UK	Skepta	Won
2017	NME Awards	Best British Male	Skepta	Won
2017	NME Awards	Best Album supported	Konnichiwa	Nominated
2017	NME Awards	Best Track	"Man"	Nominated
2017	NME Awards	Music Moment Of The Year	Skepta wins Mercury Prize	Nominated
2017	BRIT Awards	British Male Solo Artist	Skepta	Nominated
2017	BRIT Awards	British Breakthrough Act	Skepta	Nominated
2017	BRIT Awards	MasterCard British Album of the Year	Konnichiwa	Nominated
2017	BET Awards	Best International Act: Europe	Skepta	Nominated
2024	Ivor Novello Award	Visionary Award with Amazon Music	Skepta	Won
2024	AFRIFF 2024	Audience Choice Awards	Tribal Mark	Won
