= Boy Better Know =

Music collective and label in Britain

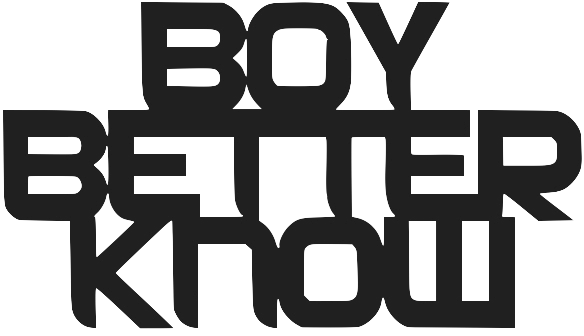
- Boy Better Know logo

Background information
- Also known as: BBK
- Origin: London, England
- Genre: Grime
- Years active: 2005–present
- Label: Boy Better Know
- Members: Jme; Skepta; Frisco; Jammer; DJ Maximum; Preditah; Shorty
- Past members: Solo 45; Wiley
- Website: boybetterknow.com

Boy Better Know, often abbreviated as BBK, is a British grime collective and record label. The collective was founded in North London in 2005 as an independent record label by brothers Jamie and Joseph Adenuga, better known as Jme and Skepta, respectively. The former also serves as a sole owner and director of an associated company, Boy Better Know Limited, incorporated in 2008. All members of the collective use the record label as a means to publish their music, and is digitally distributed by The Orchard, a subsidiary of Sony Music.

== History ==
In the early 2000s, Meridian Crew, consisting of MCs President T, Skepta, Jme, Big H, Bossman Birdie, Meridian Dan and Paper Pabs regularly appeared on pirate radio stations, including Heat FM and later on Déjà Vu FM. In 2005, Meridian Crew dissolved after affiliates of the crew were convicted on attempted murder charges. After this event, Jme founded Boy Better Know alongside his brother Skepta while other Meridian members reformed as Meridian Bloodline, known later simply as Bloodline.

In its early period, "Boy Better Know" was well known for its line of eponymous T-shirts. The crew also had a regular show on Rinse FM with DJ Maximum. The first album published under the label and Jme's debut studio album, Famous? was released on July 14th 2008. "Too Many Man", the first single put out by the label as a collective, was released on 25 May 2009. The song is also featured on the Wiley and Skepta albums, Race Against Time and Microphone Champion, respectively. The song was written because of Skepta's annoyance over 'the lack of women in clubs'. It entered the UK Singles Chart on 6 June 2009 at number 97, reaching number 79 the next week. The second single from the album V.I.P, titled "Goin' In", was released for download on iTunes on 13 December 2009.

Jme's second studio album, Blam!, was released on 4 October 2010. Three singles from this album were released; "Over Me", "Sidetracked", which features Wiley, and "CD is Dead" featuring UK grime artist Tempa T.

In 2008, Boy Better Know pioneered a short-lived dance fad called the "Rolex Sweep" which accompanied the song of the same name by Skepta.

In November 2011, Boy Better Know Mobile was established, a 3G network which leases network bandwidth from Hutchison 3G. This venture was ended in mid-2013.

In February 2016, Canadian rapper Drake announced that he signed to BBK, making him the first Canadian artist to be signed to the British label/collective.

In October 2017, Solo 45 was arrested by Avon and Somerset Police following an investigation into allegations of sexual and physical abuse. He was initially charged with multiple offences, which later expanded to 30 total charges as further evidence from his digital devices was uncovered. In March 2020, he was found guilty at Bristol Crown Court of 21 counts of rape, 5 counts of false imprisonment, 2 assaults by penetration, and 2 assaults occasioning actual bodily harm against four women. He was originally sentenced to 24 years in prison in July 2020, which was later increased to 30 years by the Court of Appeal in January 2021. After that, Boy Better Know cut all ties with the artist.

In October 2018, Wiley began a feud with Skepta and Dizzee Rascal over Skepta working with Dizzee on the track 'Money Right'. On 19 November Wiley released the track 'Flip the Table', where he refers to Dizzee as the 'Grime scene quitter'.After that, he left BBK.

== Notable Members & Previous Members ==
Musicians

- Jme (2005–present)
- Skepta (2005–present)
- Jammer (2005–present)
- Frisco (2005–present)
- Shorty (2006–present)
- Solo 45 (2005–2017) (Jailed for multiple counts of sexual assault)
- Wiley (2005–2018) (Feuding between BBK founder Skepta and Dizzee Rascal as well as other grime artists led to Wiley leaving the group and label)

DJs & Producers

- DJ Maximum (2006–present)
- Preditah (2013–present)

== Discography ==
=== Albums, Mixtapes & EPs ===
- Jme - The JME EP (2005)
- Jme - Serious (2005)
- Jme - Check It
- Jme - Don't Chat (2005)
- Jme & Trigz - Serious (2005)
- Jme - Boy Better Know (2006)
- Tinchy Stryder - I'm Back U Know (2006)^
- Skepta - Duppy (2006)
- Jme - Boy Better Know: Edition 1 (2006)
- Jme - Boy Better Know: Edition 2 (2006)
- Jme - Boy Better Know: Edition 3 (2006)
- Jme - Boy Better Know: Edition 4 - Tropical (2006)
- Wiley – Da 2nd Phaze (2006)
- Wiley - Tunnel Vision, Volume 1 (2006)
- Wiley - Tunnel Vision, Volume 2 (2006)
- Wiley - Tunnel Vision, Volume 3 (2006)
- Tinchy Stryder - Lost And Found (2006)^
- Jme - Merry Christmas (2006)
- Wiley - Tunnel Vision, Volume 4 (2006)
- Jme - Badderman EP (2006)
- Jme - Tropical (2006)
- Frisco – Back 2 Da Lab, Vol 1 (2006)
- Skepta - Stupid EP (2006)
- Jme - Waisman EP (2006)
- Wiley - Tunnel Vision, Volume 5 (2007)
- Frisco – Back 2 Da Lab, Vol 2 (2007)
- Skepta – Greatest Hits (2007)
- Jme – Famous? (2008)
- Frisco – Back 2 Da Lab, Vol 3 (2009)
- Skepta – Microphone Champion (2009)
- Frisco - Eyes on You / Girls (2009)
- Skepta - Been There Done That (2010)
- Skepta - Bad Boy (2010)
- Skepta - Rescue Me (2010)
- Jme – Blam! (2010)
- Frisco – Fully Grown (2010)
- Jme - CD Is Dead (2010)
- Jme – History: (2011)
- Frisco - Ghost Train (2011)
- Shorty – Short Notice (2011)
- Skepta - Community Payback (2011)
- Frisco – Back 2 Da Lab Compilation (2011)
- Jme - Boy Better Know: Tropical 2 (2011)
- Frisco – Back 2 Da Lab Vol. 4 (2012)
- Skepta – Blacklisted (2012)
- Jammer – Living the Dream (2013)
- Frisco – British Nights (2014)
- Jme – Integrity (2015)
- Frisco – System Killer (2016)
- Skepta – Konnichiwa (2016)
- Skepta - Live From London (2016)
- Shorty – Moesh Music (2016)
- Wiley – Godfather (2017)^^
- Frisco – Serrvice (2017)
- Frisco – Back 2 Da Lab Vol. 5 (2018)
- Wiley – Godfather II (2018)^^
- Skepta – Ignorance is Bliss (2019)
- Jme – Grime MC (2019)
- Frisco – The Familiar Stranger (2020)
- Jme, Shorty, Frisco, Capo Lee – Norf Face (2021)
- Skepta – All In (2021)
- Frisco - Tottenham (2022)

^ = Although Tinchy Stryder was never an official member of BBK; he released these 2 projects via the label

^^ = Released on CTA Records; not released via Boy Better Know Records

=== Singles ===
Year	Title	Peak chart positions	Album
Year	Title	UK	Album
2009	"Too Many Man"	79	V.I.P
2010	"Goin' In"	—	V.I.P
2018	"Athlete" (featuring Goldie1)	—	Non-album single
