= Giggs discography =

Discography for British rapper Giggs

- Studio albums: 6
- Singles: 9
- Music videos: 27
- Mixtapes: 19

British rapper Giggs has released six studio albums, eighteen mixtapes, nine solo singles (not including any as a featured artist) and twenty-seven music videos. A majority of his releases have been independently released through SN1 Records, alongside several releases through XL Recordings and Takeover Entertainment.

In August 2008, Giggs released his debut album Walk in da Park independently. The album charted at number 143 on the UK Albums Chart, number 9 on the UK Independent Chart and number 13 on the UK R&B Chart. No singles were released from the album. Two years later, Giggs' second album Let Em Ave It became his first top 40 entry, charting at number 35 on the UK Albums Chart. It spawned four singles – "Slow Songs", "Don't Go There", "Look What the Cat Dragged In" and "Hustle On". Two of the four singles peaked in the top 100. In October 2013, Giggs' third studio album was released, When Will It Stop?. The album peaked at number 21 on the UK Albums Chart, becoming Giggs' highest-charting release at the time.

In August 2016, Giggs released his fourth studio album, Landlord, becoming his most successful release to date. It entered and peaked at number 2 on the UK Albums Chart. In 2017, the commercial mixtape Wamp 2 Dem also peaked at number 2 on the UK Albums Chart. The latter project spawned the single "Linguo" featuring Donae'o, Giggs' most successful solo single, peaking at number 28 on the UK Singles Chart. In the same year, Giggs earned his first top 40 entries through his guest appearances on the songs "No Long Talk" and "KMT" by Canadian rapper Drake from his commercial project More Life (2017) – peaking at number 9 and number 7 on the UK Singles Chart respectively.

== Studio albums ==
List of studio albums, with chart positions
Title	Album details	Peak chart positions					Certifications
Title	Album details	UK	UK R&B	UK Ind.	IRE	SCO	Certifications
Walk in da Park	Released: 4 August 2008; Label: SN1; Formats: CD, digital download	143	13	9	—	—	
Let Em Ave It	Released: 21 June 2010; Label: XL, Takeover Entertainment; Formats: CD, digital download	35	7	2	—	—	
When Will It Stop	Released: 11 October 2013; Label: SN1 (Distributed by XL); Formats: CD, digital download	21	2	5	—	—	
Landlord	Released: 5 August 2016; Label: SN1; Formats: CD, digital download	2	1	1	—	39	BPI: Silver
Big Bad...	Released: 22 February 2019; Label: No BS Music, Island; Formats: CD, digital download	6	1	—	62	38	
Zero Tolerance	Released: 18 August 2023; Label: No BS Music, Island; Formats: Digital download	48	15	—	—	—	
"—" denotes a recording that did not chart or was not released in that territory.

== Mixtapes ==
=== Commercial mixtapes ===
List of commercial mixtapes, with chart positions
Title	Album details	Peak chart positions		Certifications
Title	Album details	UK	UK R&B	Certifications
Wamp 2 Dem	Released: 6 October 2017; Label: No BS Music, Island; Formats: CD, digital download	2	1	BPI: Silver
Now or Never	Released: 6 November 2020; Label: No BS Music, Island; Formats: CD, digital download	15	—	

=== Other mixtapes ===
- Bloody Raw (2005)
- SN1 – The Beginning (with Gunna Dee & Joe Grind) (2006)
- Best of Giggs (The Real Meaning) (2006)
- Hollow Grind (with Joe Grind) (2006)
- SN1- Welcome To Boomsville (2006)
- Hollowman Meets Blade (with Blade Brown) (2007)
- Ard Bodied (with Dubz) (2007)
- Best of Giggs 2 (2008)
- Who Said That? (with Tiny Boost) (2009)
- Another Quick One (2009)
- Best of Giggs 3 (2010)
- Take Your Hats Off (hosted by DJ Whoo Kid) (2011)
- Every Angle Friday (2011)
- The Final Straw (2011)
- Best of Giggs 4 (2013)
- STR8 Murkin (2014)
- The SN1 Folder (2015)
- Best of Giggs 5 (2018)

== Singles ==
=== As lead artist ===
List of singles as lead artist, with selected chart positions, showing year released and album name
Title	Year	Peak chart positions			Certifications	Album
Title	Year	UK	UK Ind	UK R&B	Certifications	Album
"Talkin the Hardest"	2007	—	—	—	BPI: Platinum	Best of Giggs 2
"Slow Songs" (featuring Mike Skinner)	2009	—	—	—		Let Em Ave It
"Don't Go There" (featuring B.o.B)	2010	60	3	16		Let Em Ave It
"Look What the Cat Dragged In"	2010	53	3	20	BPI: Silver	Let Em Ave It
"Hustle On"	2010	—	—	—		Let Em Ave It
"(Is It Gangsta?) Yes Yes Yes"	2013	—	—	—		When Will It Stop
"Who's Dat?"	2015	—	—	—		Non-album single
"Whippin' Excursion"	2016	193	—	—	BPI: Silver	Landlord
"Lock Doh" (featuring Donae'o)	2016	52	5	12	BPI: Platinum	Landlord
"Rap Gustavo"	2016	—	—	—		Non-album single
"Linguo" (featuring Donae'o)	2017	28	—	—	BPI: Gold	Wamp 2 Dem
"Hermes" (with Big Lean)	2018	—	—	—		Non-album singles
"Pistol" (with RA)	2018	—	—	—		Non-album singles
"187"	2019	42	—	—		Big Bad...
"Fire in the Booth, Pt. 4"	2019	—	—	—		Non-album singles
"Just Coz" (with Aitch)	2022	42	—	14		Non-album singles
"Mandem" (with Diddy)	2023	—	—	—		Zero Tolerance
"We Made It" (with Maino)	2023	—	—	—		K.O.B. 4
"—" denotes a recording that did not chart or was not released in that territory.

=== As featured artist ===
List of singles as a featured artist, with selected chart positions, showing year released and album name
Title	Year	Peak chart positions	Certifications	Album
Title	Year	UK	Certifications	Album
"Man Don't Care" (JME featuring Giggs)	2015	100	BPI: Platinum	Integrity>
"More Ratatatin" (Chase & Status featuring Giggs)	2015	—		London Bars – EP
"3 Wheel-Ups" (Kano featuring Wiley & Giggs)	2016	126	BPI: Gold	Made in the Manor
"Active" (Sneakbo featuring Wiley & Giggs)	2017	90		Brixton
"Trigger Bang" (Lily Allen featuring Giggs)	2017	—		No Shame
"Higher" (Emeli Sande featuring Giggs)	2017	—		Kingdom Coming
"London Town" (Mr Eazi featuring Giggs)	2018	—		Life is Eazi, Vol. 2 - Lagos to London
"Bebey" (SN1 Road Mix) (Theophilus London featuring Giggs)	2018	—		Bebey
"Come Again" (Swizz Beatz featuring Giggs)	2018	—		Poison
"No Face No Case" (GASHI featuring Giggs)	2018	—		Non-album single
"Where & When" (P Money featuring Giggs)	2019	—		Money Over Everyone 3
"10/10" (Wretch 32 featuring Giggs)	2019	97		Upon Reflection
"Block's Hot" (Blade Brown featuring Giggs)	2019	—		Bags & Boxes, Vol. 4
"Mek Money" (OG Merks & Brandish featuring Giggs)	2020	—		TBA
"Trap House" (Joe Grind featuring Giggs)	2020	—		RTG 2: Embrace The Grind
"Been Thru This Before" (Marshmello & Southside featuring Giggs & Saint Jhn)	2020	—		Non-album singles
"Suffer" (GRM Daily featuring Giggs & Tion Wayne)	2022	—		Non-album singles
"—" denotes a recording that did not chart or was not released in that territory.

== Other charted and certified songs ==
List of other charted and certified songs, with selected chart positions and certifications, showing year released and album name
Title	Year	Peak chart positions							Certifications	Album
Title	Year	UK	CAN	FRA	IRL	NLD	SWE	US	Certifications	Album
"Game Over" (Tinchy Stryder featuring Giggs, Devlin, Example, Professor Green, Tinie Tempah and Chipmunk)	2010	22	—	—	—	—	—	—		Third Strike
"The Blow Back" (featuring Stormzy and Dubz)	2016	170	—	—	—	—	—	—		Landlord
"Whippin Excursion"	2016	—	—	—	—	—	—	—	BPI: Silver	Landlord
"No Long Talk" (Drake featuring Giggs)	2017	17	14	124	40	77	92	40	BPI: Silver	More Life
"KMT" (Drake featuring Giggs)	2017	9	25	183	44	—	— (Note: "KMT" did not enter the Swedish Singellista chart, but peaked at number seven on the Swedish Heatseeker chart.)	48	BPI: Platinum	More Life
"Ultimate Gangsta" (featuring 2 Chainz)	2017	51	—	—	—	—	—	—		Wamp 2 Dem
"Peligro" (featuring Dave)	2017	53	—	—	—	—	—	—	BPI: Gold	Wamp 2 Dem
"The Essence"	2017	—	—	—	—	—	—	—	BPI: Silver	Wamp 2 Dem
"Nothing But Net" (with AJ Tracey)	2019	99	—	—	—	—	—	—		AJ Tracey
"Baby"	2019	48	—	—	—	—	—	—	BPI: Silver	Big Bad...
"Northside Southside" (Meek Mill featuring Giggs)	2021	—	—	—	—	—	—	— (Note: "Northside Southside" did not enter the Billboard Hot 100, but peaked at number 18 on the Bubbling Under Hot 100 chart.)		Expensive Pain
"Incredible Sauce" (featuring Dave)	2023	65	—	—	69	—	—	—	BPI: Silver	Zero Tolerance
"—" denotes a recording that did not chart or was not released in that territory.

== Guest appearances ==
List of non-single guest appearances, with other performing artists, showing year released and album name
Title	Year	Other artist(s)	Album
"IC3"	2006	Akala, Buck Boy	A Little Darker
"Get da Packs Out"	2007	Kyze	Today's My Deadline
"Playtime"	2007	Kyze	Today's My Deadline
"It Ain't Fun"	2007	Kyze, T. Boost	Today's My Deadline
"Look Out"	2009	Skepta	Microphone Champion
"Zip It Up"	2009	Wiley, Trigga	Race Against Time
"Riding Season"	2009	Dubz	Ard Doe
"Black Bandana Wearer"	2009	Joe Grind, Killa Ki	Not Your Average Joe
"Gully Trap"	2009	Joe Grind, Gunna	Not Your Average Joe
"Looking Up the Game"	2009	Joe Grind, T. Boost	Not Your Average Joe
"Back 2 Basics"	2010	Sway	The Delivery Mixtape
"Shot Music"	2010	Devlin	—N/a
"Pop Stars"	2010	Gunna Dee, Fix Dot'm	Hustler By Nature
"Block Buster"	2010	Gunna Dee	Hustler By Nature
"Raasclart Riddim"	2010	Gunna Dee	Hustler By Nature
"Game Over"	2010	Tinchy Stryder, Professor Green, Tinie Tempah, Devlin, Example, Chipmunk	Third Strike
"30 Rounds"	2010	J Bubbs, Malik, S.A.S, G FrSH	—N/a
"Shutdown"	2010	Joe Black	—N/a
"This Rap Shit's Happening (Remix)"	2010	Joe Grind, Fix Dot'm, Jamila	—N/a
"Be with You"	2011	Ny	Who Is She?
"Ice Cream Man"	2011	Tempman	Shooting Star 4
"Popstar"	2011	Angel	7 Minutes Before Time
"Gucci Gucci (Remix)"	2011	Kreayshawn	—N/a
"No Comment"	2011	Ghetts	Momentum
"I'm On One"	2011	Wiley	Creating a Buzz
"Dem Man"	2012	Kano	Jack Bauer 2.4
"Backhand Pricks"	2012	Bashy	The Great Escape EP
"Peckham 2 Brixton"	2012	Big Narstie, Darko, Crumbs, Solo	Pain is Love
"Leak-a-Mixtape"	2012	Tinie Tempah	Happy Birthday
"Set It Off"	2012	Angel	In Between Time
"Head Above Water"	2013	Smiler	The Coming
"Make a Killing"	2013	Gunna Dee	Hustler by Nature 2
"The Hunger Strikes"	2013	Joe Grind	EPisode 2: The Hunger Strikes
"Godzillas"	2013	Joe Grind, Ghetts	EPisode 2: The Hunger Strikes
"Know Your Place"	2013	Joe Grind, Gunna Dee	EPisode 2: The Hunger Strikes
"Bloodclart"	2013	Krept and Konan	Young Kingz
"Lemme Get Dat"	2013	Bayoz Muzik, Waka Flocka Flame	Death of a Beatmaker (DOB)
"Gangsters"	2014	Lolo	—N/a
"Till Dawn"	2014	Alyssa English	Girlfriend EP
"Punani"	2014	Kyze	AM
"Drumline"	2014	Kyze	AM
"Ask for Me"	2014	Kyze	AM
"Work It Like a Pro"	2014	Waka Flocka Flame	Re-Up
"The Baddest (Remix)"	2014	Moelogo	—N/a
"Gas Mark 9"	2014	Ghetts	Rebel with a Cause
"Support Machine"	2014	Lily McKenzie	Support Machine EP
"Who Said Dat?"	2014	Ghetts	Momentum 2 (The Return of Ghetto)
"The Ride"	2014	Mr Bigz, J Warner	S.U.M.M.E.R
"Mack Daddy"	2015	Kyze	Oliver Twisted EP
"Flexin'"	2015	Frenchy Le Boss	—N/a
"Nutcrackerz"	2015	Dizzee Rascal	—N/a
"How We Started"	2015	Gunna Dee, Joe Grind, Kyze, Tiny Boost	Hustlism
"LOTM Freestyle"	2015	—N/a	Lord of the Mics VII
"Man Don't Care"	2015	Jme	Integrity
"Lift Your Wallets"	2015	Haze	Visionary
"Intro Freestyle"	2015	DJ Big Ryde	Just a Reminder
"Move Back"	2015	DJ Big Ryde, Fix Dot'M	Just a Reminder
"HBN Freestyle"	2015	DJ Big Ryde	Just a Reminder
"Spotify"	2015	DJ Big Ryde	Just a Reminder
"Lights Out"	2015	Hannah Lucia	—N/a
"Get Comfy (Underground Sound Suicide)"	2015	Loco Dice	Underground Sound Suicide
"Still (Remix)"	2015	Mo G, Smoke Dawg	—N/a
"We Dem Niggas"	2015	Potter Payper	—N/a
"Gangster for Certain"	2015	Young Spray	Invisible Tears
"Good One"	2015	Mark Asari	—N/a
"What's My Name? (Remix)"	2015	CASisDEAD	—N/a
"More Ratatatin"	2015	Chase & Status	London Bars
"Round Here"	2015	Skrapz	The End of the Beginning
"Swan Song"	2015	Espa	—N/a
"3 Wheel-Ups"	2016	Kano, Wiley	Made in the Manor
"Look At Me"	2016	Tinie Tempah	Junk Food
"Start Again"	2016	Mikill Pane	Let MC It
"Hot Water"	2016	Footsie	—N/a
"Let's Lurk"	2016	67	Let's Lurk
"Coming Through"	2016	Cadell	3 is the New 6
"Gossip"	2016	Fekky	El Clasico
"Move"	2016	Tinchy Stryder, Bayku	360° / The Cloud 9 LP
"Round Here"	2017	Lethal Bizzle, Flowdan	—N/a
"Like Dat"	2017	Shaun White	—N/a
"Real Ting (Remix)"	2017	Stefflon Don	—N/a
"Early This Morning"	2017	Everything Is Recorded	Close but Not Quite EP
"Wake Up"	2017	Charlie Sloth	The Plug
"We Dem"	2017	Charlie Sloth, Potter Payper	The Plug
"Amazing Minds"	2017	Chip	League of my Own II
"Gangster for Certain"	2017	Young Spray	Invisible Tears
"Trigger Bang"	2017	Lily Allen	No Shame
"Jeremy Clarkson"	2017	Mukz Merrello	Since Forever
"Wet Looking Road"	2018	Everything Is Recorded	Everything Is Recorded by Richard Russell
"Work It Like a Pro"	2018	Waka Flocka Flame	Re-Up
"Swinging In Da Whip"	2018	Da Beatfreakz	—N/a
"Active"	2018	Sneakbo	Brixton
"Black Gang"	2018	Killa Ki	—N/a
"If You Only Knew"	2018	Loick Essien	—N/a
"Fly"	2018	Angel, Haile WSTRN	Woman
"Nothing But Net"	2019	AJ Tracey	AJ Tracey
"My Town"	2019	Baka Not Nice	no long talk. – Single
"Blocks Hot"	2019	Blade Brown	Bags and Boxes 4
"Make It Right"	2019	None	Rapman Presents: Blue Story (Music Inspired By the Original Motion Picture)
"Knock Your Block Off"	2019	JME	Grime MC
"Crud"	2021	Ghetts	Conflict of Interest
"In the Fire"	2021	Dave, Fredo, Meekz, Ghetts	We're All Alone In This Together

== Music videos ==
List of solo music videos, showing year released and director
Title	Year	Director
"You Raised Me / Open Up"	2009	Teddy Nygh
"Uummm!"	2009	Giggs
"Look Out" (with Skepta)	2009	SB.TV
"Slow Songs" (with Mike Skinner)	2009	Sacha Khari
"Don't Go There" (with B.o.B)	2010	Adam Powell
"Look What the Cat Dragged In"	2010	Adam Powell
"30 Rounds" (with J Bubbs et al.)	2010	Jason McKoy
"Shot Music" (with Devlin)	2010	Digital Dan
"Hustle On"	2010	Adam Powell
"Out There"	2010	Morgan Keyz
"Game Over" (with Tinchy Stryder et al.)	2010	Adam Powell
"Bus Commercial"	2010	Post Diddy
"Monsta Man"	2011	Oliver Whitehouse
"Look Over Your Shoulder" (with Example)	2011	Oliver Whitehouse
"Showout Freestyle"	2011	Morgan Keyz
"What Niggas Want"	2012	RAPCITY TV
"Raw Bands"	2012	GRM Daily
"Lemme Get Dat" (with Waka Flocka Flame)	2012	Morgan Keyz
"Cool Nuh" (with Wretch 32)	2013	GRM Daily
"(Is It Gangsta?) Yes Yes Yes"	2013	Reg Traviss
"Mr Kool" (featuring Anthony Hamilton)	2014	Teddy Nygh
"Who's Dat"	2015	Myles Whittingham
"Whippin Excursion"	2016	B Dot x Toxic
"501 (Hollow & Heston)" (with CASisDEAD)	2016	CASisDEAD
"Lock Doh" (featuring Donae'o)	2016	Myles Whittingham
"Sexy" (with Pressa)	2017	—N/a
"Linguo" (featuring Donae'o)	2017	Myles Whittingham
