= Wamp 2 Dem =

Mixtape by Giggs
- Released: 6 October 2017
- Recorded: 2016–17
- Genre: British hip hop; trap
- Length: 46:32
- Label: No BS; Island
- Producer: Giggs (also exec.); 808-Ray; Bricks Da Mane; Chris Childs; Cool & Dre; Cubeatz; Donae'o; Flyo; Footsie; Illa; Jay Jay Heston; London on da Track; M16; Narcos; The Fanatix; Zaytoven

Giggs chronology
Landlord (2016)	Wamp 2 Dem (2017)	Big Bad... (2019)

Singles from Wamp 2 Dem
- 1. "Linguo" Released: 29 November 2017

Wamp 2 Dem is a commercial mixtape by English rapper Giggs. It was released on 6 October 2017 by No BS Music, while the mixtape was distributed by Island Records. It succeeds Giggs' fourth album Landlord (2016), released a year and two months prior, and is Giggs' first release with a major label. The mixtape includes guest appearances from American rappers 2 Chainz, Young Thug and Lil Duke, alongside Dave, Footsie, D Double E, Popcaan and Donae'o. Production was handled by Cool & Dre, London on da Track, Zaytoven, The Fanatix, Bricks Da Mane and Chris Childs, among others.

The mixtape was supported by one single – "Linguo" featuring Donae'o, which became Giggs' highest-charting single.

== Background ==
In August 2016, Giggs released his fourth album Landlord to positive reception, entering at number 2 on the UK Albums Chart. In early 2017, Giggs was featured on two tracks from Canadian rapper Drake's album More Life, "No Long Talk" and "KMT". The guest appearances led to significant widespread attention for Giggs and his music. The same month, Giggs announced the Wamp 2 Dem mixtape on The SN1 Snow on Beats 1 Radio.

Giggs described the mixtape as "a response to Americans who criticise UK rap", stating: "People wasn't really respecting England. Wamp 2 Dem was more showing where we're coming, [explaining that] we're the same as you."

The mixtape's artwork was unveiled in June 2017, while the release date was revealed on 4 September 2017 via Instagram.

== Promotion ==
Wamp 2 Dem was promoted by Giggs through Instagram, posting teaser trailers compiling online reactions to his verse from Drake's "KMT", song previews and meme voiceovers. Numerous billboards and posters were set up around London the week leading up to the release.

=== Singles ===
The first single, "Linguo" featuring Donae'o, was released on 29 November 2017. The song peaked at number 28 on the UK Singles Chart, becoming Giggs' first solo single to enter the top 40 and thus his highest-charting solo single to date.

== Release ==
Wamp 2 Dem was released on 6 October 2017 for iTunes purchase and streaming via Spotify and Apple Music, as well as purchase through Google Play and Amazon. The mixtape was also made available for free download through Giggs' official website.

== Track listing ==
Wamp 2 Dem
No.	Title	Writer(s)	Producer(s)	Length
1.	"Gully Niggaz"	Nathaniel Thompson; Andre Lyons; Marcello Valenzano; Rayshon Cobbs	Cool & Dre; 808-Ray	3:12
2.	"Ultimate Gangsta" (featuring 2 Chainz)	Thompson; Tauheed Epps; Charles Driggers	Bricks Da Mane	5:04
3.	"Straight Lifestyle"	Thompson	Flyo; Jay Jay Heston	2:43
4.	"Times Ticking" (featuring Popcaan)	Thompson; Andrae Sutherland	The Fanatix	3:54
5.	"The Essence"	Thompson; Lyons; Valenzano	Cool & Dre	3:48
6.	"Linguo" (featuring Donae'o)	Thompson; Ian Greenidge	Donae'o	2:54
7.	"Gangstas & Dancers" (featuring Lil Duke and Young Thug)	Thompson; Jeffery Williams; London Holmes; Kevin Gomringer; Tim Gomringer	London on da Track; Cubeatz	3:06
8.	"Moist Pussy"	Thompson; Driggers	Narcos; Bricks Da Mane	3:04
9.	"50 Cali"	Thompson; Xavier Dotson	Zaytoven	3:01
10.	"Outsiders" (featuring Footsie and D Double E)	Thompson; Daniel Carnegie; Darren Dixon	Footsie	4:03
11.	"Horror Movie"	Thompson; Illya Fraser	Illa da Producer	3:06
12.	"Peligro" (featuring Dave)	Thompson; David Santan	Chris Childs	4:20
13.	"Ruler"	Thompson	M16	4:17
Total length:				46:32

== Personnel ==
Credits adapted from Tidal.

- Giggs – primary artist, executive producer
- 2 Chainz – featured artist
- Bricks Da Mane – producer (tracks 2, 8)
- Chris Childs – producer (track 12)
- Cool & Dre – producer, mixing (tracks 1, 5)
- D Double E – featured artist
- Dave – featured artist
- Dirty Saj – recording engineer
- Donae'o – producer, featured artist (track 6)
- Flyo – producer (track 4)
- Footsie – featured artist
- Illa – producer (track 11)
- Jay Jay Heston – producer (track 4)
- Lil Duke – featured artist
- London on da Track – producer (track 7)
- M16 – producer (track 13)
- Narcos – producer (track 8)
- Popcaan – featured artist
- The Fanatix – producer (track 5)
- Young Thug – featured artist
- Zaytoven – producer (track 9)

== Charts ==
Chart (2017)	Peak position
Scottish Albums (OCC)	63
UK Albums (OCC)	2
UK R&B Albums (OCC)	1

== The Essence ==
The Essence is a 3-part film series inspired by the soundtracks of Gigg's albums. Part one was released on 12 April 2019 on Giggs' YouTube channel. It was written by Michael 'Buck' Maris, Ashley Chin and April Walker. Myles Whittingham directed the film and it was produced by Mouktar Mohamed. Ashley Chin also plays a lead role in the film and also stars Dorcas Shola-Fapson, Rashid Kasirye with Giggs making a cameo in the film. It would be the second time Giggs has worked with Chin, the first being Victim. The film was sponsored by ASOS, True Religion, Nike, Inc., Adidas, Benjart, Fresh Ego Kid, Dollars and Pounds amongst others.

Part 2 was released on 20 December 2019 and was inspired by the soundtrack of the Giggs' album Big Bad.... The second part of the series touches on the topics of gun culture, suicide, and abortion, outlining serious issues that affect the community living their daily lives in the streets.

Part 3 was released a year later on 20 December 2020 and is inspired by the soundtrack of the Giggs mixtape Now Or Never.

=== Cast ===
- Ashley Chin as Isaac
- Michael Maris as Marcus
- Dorcas Shola-Fapson as Ava
- Aymen Hamdouchi as Youssef
- Suspect as Weebs
- Nico James as Jacob
- Giggs as N.T.
- Rashid Kasirye as Camera Man
- Harvey Allen

=== Episodes ===
Episode	Production Companies	Released	Length	Views (as of September 2021)
1	Island Records, Elixir Pictures, Globe Productions	12 May 2019	28:51	3.5 million
2	Elixir Pictures, Globe Productions	20 December 2019	37:08	1.4 million
3	Island Records	20 December 2020	38.27	0.8 million
