= Walk in the Park =

Walk in the Park may refer to:

- Walk in the Park, a 1998 album by Lodger
- "Walk in the Park", a song by Beach House from their 2010 album Teen Dream
- "Walk in the Park", a song by Kelsea Ballerini from her 2022 album Subject to Change
- Walk in da Park, a 2008 album by Giggs
