= Free Smoke =

Single by Drake

from the album More Life
- Released: April 18, 2017
- Recorded: 2017
- Studio: SOTA Studios, Studio 306 and Four Seasons, Toronto
- Genre: Hip hop
- Length: 3:39 (album version); 3:13 (radio edit)
- Label: Cash Money; Young Money; Republic
- Songwriters: Aubrey Graham; Matthew Samuels; Allen Ritter; Marvin Bernard; Bryan Antoine; Daniel Sewell; Paul Bender; Simon Mavin; Perrin Moss; Naomi Saalfield
- Producer: Boi-1da

Drake singles chronology
"Come Closer" (2017)	"Free Smoke" (2017)	"Portland" (2017)

"Free Smoke" is a song by Canadian rapper Drake from his album, More Life (2017). The song was released on April 18, 2017, as the third single from More Life after "Passionfruit". The song features additional background vocals by Baka Not Nice, who is one of two credited musicians on More Life. The song was perceived by the media as a diss track to Meek Mill, as well as other rappers he could be feuding with. It reached the top 20 in Canada and the United States.

The song contains a sample of Tony Yayo and Danny Brown‘s 2010 track “Roll Up” featured on their collaborative mixtape, Hawaiian Snow released in 2010.

== Commercial performance ==
On April 8, 2017, "Free Smoke" entered the charts at number 12 and spent six weeks on the Billboard Canadian Hot 100. The song spent four weeks on the US Billboard Hot 100, entering the charts at number 18, its immediate peak, on April 8, 2017.

The song peaked in the top 40 in Ireland, Switzerland, the United Kingdom and charted on the charts of France, Germany, the Netherlands, New Zealand (Heatseekers), Portugal, Slovakia, and Sweden.

== Charts ==
Chart (2017)	Peak position
Canada Hot 100 (Billboard)	12
France (SNEP)	93
Germany (GfK)	81
Ireland (IRMA)	36
Netherlands (Single Top 100)	59
New Zealand Heatseekers (Recorded Music NZ)	2
Portugal (AFP)	44
Slovakia Singles Digital (ČNS IFPI)	70
Sweden (Sverigetopplistan)	69
Switzerland (Schweizer Hitparade)	34
UK Singles (Official Charts)	36
UK Hip Hop/R&B (Official Charts)	11
US Billboard Hot 100	18
US Hot R&B/Hip-Hop Songs (Billboard)	11

== Certifications ==
Region	Certification	Certified units/sales
Australia (ARIA)	Gold	35,000^{‡}
United Kingdom (BPI)	Silver	200,000^{‡}
United States (RIAA)	Platinum	1,000,000^{‡}
^{‡} Sales+streaming figures based on certification alone.

== Release history ==
Region	Date	Format	Label(s)	Ref.
United States	April 18, 2017	Rhythmic contemporary	Young Money; Cash Money; Republic	
