= Glow (Drake song) =

2017 song by Drake

Single by Drake featuring Kanye West

from the album More Life
- Released: June 6, 2017
- Recorded: 2017
- Studio: SOTA Studios, Studio 306 and Four Seasons, Toronto
- Genre: Pop-rap
- Length: 3:26
- Label: Cash Money; Young Money; Republic
- Songwriters: Aubrey Graham; Kanye West; Noah Shebib; Malik Yusef; Sakiya Sandifer; Philip Bailey; Noah Goldstein; Maurice White; Carlo Montagnese; Majid Al-Maskati; Gabriel Garzón-Montano; Jefferies; Ilsey Juber; Jordan Johnstone; Louis Johnson; Cydel Young; Kenza Samir; Jordan Ullman
- Producers: 40; West

Drake singles chronology
"Portland" (2017)	"Glow" (2017)	"Signs" (2017)

Kanye West singles chronology
"Love Yourself" (2017)	"Glow" (2017)	"Lift Yourself" (2018)

"Glow" is a song by Canadian rapper Drake from his fifth commercial mixtape, More Life (2017). It features vocals from American rapper Kanye West. The song was sent to rhythmic crossover radio June 6, 2017, as the album's fifth single. Lyrically, "Glow" finds both rappers chronicling their climbs to success and fame. West co-produced the song with Canadian record producer 40. Glow contains samples from the song "Devotion" by Earth, Wind & Fire and band members Philip Bailey and Maurice White received songwriting credit.

== Commercial performance ==
=== North America ===
On April 8, 2017, "Glow" entered the charts at number 37 on the Billboard Canadian Hot 100. The song spent two weeks on the US Billboard Hot 100, entering the charts at number 54, its immediate peak, on April 8, 2017.

=== Internationally ===
The song has charted on the charts of Ireland, Sweden (Heatseeker) and the United Kingdom.

== Charts ==
Chart (2017)	Peak position
Canada Hot 100 (Billboard)	37
Ireland (IRMA)	65
Sweden Heatseeker (Sverigetopplistan)	9
UK Singles (OCC)	55
UK Hip Hop/R&B (OCC)	18
US Billboard Hot 100	54
US Hot R&B/Hip-Hop Songs (Billboard)	30

== Release history ==
Region	Date	Format	Label(s)	Ref.
United States	June 6, 2017	Rhythmic contemporary	Young Money; Cash Money; Republic	
