= Come Closer (Wizkid song) =

Single by Wizkid featuring Drake

from the album Sounds from the Other Side
- Released: 31 March 2017
- Recorded: 2016
- Genre: Electropop
- Length: 3:31
- Label: Starboy; RCA
- Songwriters: Ayodeji Balogun; Aubrey Graham
- Producer: Sarz

Wizkid singles chronology
"Sweet Love" (2017)	"Come Closer" (2017)	"African Bad Gyal" (2017)

Drake singles chronology
"Passionfruit" (2017)	"Come Closer" (2017)	"Free Smoke" (2017)

Music video
- "Come Closer" on YouTube

"Come Closer" is an electropop and Afropop song by Nigerian singer Wizkid featuring Canadian rapper Drake. The song was released as the third single from the former's third studio album, Sounds from the Other Side (2017).

== Background ==
Wizkid revealed the song was recorded in early 2016 at the same time as he and Drake's other collaborative single, "One Dance" (2016), which peaked at number one on the US Billboard Hot 100 as well as the UK Singles Chart and the Canadian Hot 100. The song was released as the third single from Wizkid's third studio album, Sounds from the Other Side, and was the album's most commercially successful track. The song marked Wizkid's third official collaboration with Drake.

== Commercial performance ==
The single peaked at number 58 on the UK Singles Chart, becoming Wizkid's first charting single as a lead artist, and the best-performing African record of 2017 at large. The single peaked at number 54 on the Canadian Hot 100. The song was certified Platinum in the US and the UK, 2× Platinum in Canada, 3× Platinum in South Africa, and Gold in the Switzerland.

== Music video ==
The music video for the song, directed by Daps, was released on April 7, 2017 through Wizkid's YouTube channel.

== Accolades ==
Year	Awards ceremony	Award description(s)	Results
2017	All Africa Music Awards	Song of the Year	Won
2017	Soul Train Awards	Best Dance Performance	Nominated
2017	Nigeria Entertainment Awards	Best Collabo	Nominated
2018	The Headies	Best Collaboration	Nominated
2018	The Headies	Producer of the Year	Nominated
2018	The Headies	Best Music Video	Won
2018	The Headies	Viewer's Choice	Won

== Charts ==
Chart (2017)	Peak position
Canada Hot 100 (Billboard)	54
France (SNEP)	107
Netherlands (Single Tip)	15
Scottish Singles Sales (Official Charts)	96
Switzerland (Schweizer Hitparade)	98
UK Singles (Official Charts)	50
UK Hip Hop/R&B (Official Charts)	14
US Rhythmic Airplay (Billboard)	38
US R&B/Hip-Hop Airplay (Billboard)	29

== Certifications ==
Region	Certification	Certified units/sales
Canada (Music Canada)	2× Platinum	160,000^{‡}
France (SNEP)	Gold	100,000^{‡}
South Africa (RISA)	3× Platinum	120,000^{‡}
Switzerland (IFPI Switzerland)	Gold	10,000^{‡}
United Kingdom (BPI)	Platinum	600,000^{‡}
United States (RIAA)	Platinum	1,000,000^{‡}
^{‡} Sales+streaming figures based on certification alone.
