= Portland (song) =

Single by Drake featuring Quavo and Travis Scott

from the album More Life
- Released: May 16, 2017
- Recorded: 2017
- Studio: SOTA Studios, Studio 306 and Four Seasons, Toronto
- Genre: Hip hop; trap
- Length: 3:57
- Label: Cash Money; Young Money; Republic
- Songwriters: Aubrey Graham; Quavious Marshall; Jacques Webster II; Shane Lindstrom; Tim Gomringer; Kevin Gomringer
- Producers: Murda Beatz; Cubeatz (co.)

Drake singles chronology
"Free Smoke" (2017)	"Portland" (2017)	"Glow" (2017)

Quavo singles chronology
"Raf" (2017)	"Portland" (2017)	"Strip That Down" (2017)

Travis Scott singles chronology
"Butterfly Effect" (2017)	"Portland" (2017)	"Know No Better" (2017)

"Portland" is a song by Canadian rapper Drake featuring American rappers Quavo and Travis Scott from the former's mixtape More Life. The song was sent to rhythmic crossover radio on May 16, 2017, as the fourth single from the tape. The song also appears in the video game NBA 2K18.

== Commercial performance ==
=== North America ===
On April 8, 2017, "Portland" entered the charts at number 6 and spent 18 weeks on the Billboard Canadian Hot 100. The song spent 16 weeks on the US Billboard Hot 100, entering the charts at number 9, its immediate peak, on April 8, 2017. As for the featured artists on "Portland," Quavo earned his first Hot 100 top 10 as a soloist (in addition to his first top 10 as a member of Migos, "Bad and Boujee"), while Travis Scott also achieved his first top 10 on the tally.

=== Internationally ===
The song has peaked in the top 40 in Ireland, New Zealand, Switzerland, the United Kingdom and has charted on the charts of Austria, France, Germany, the Netherlands, Portugal, Slovakia, and Sweden.

== Charts ==
=== Weekly charts ===
Chart (2017)	Peak position
Austria (Ö3 Austria Top 40)	66
Canada Hot 100 (Billboard)	6
France (SNEP)	84
Germany (GfK)	77
Ireland (IRMA)	38
Netherlands (Single Top 100)	64
New Zealand (Recorded Music NZ)	38
Portugal (AFP)	46
Slovakia Singles Digital (ČNS IFPI)	66
Sweden (Sverigetopplistan)	73
Switzerland (Schweizer Hitparade)	31
UK Singles (OCC)	27
UK Hip Hop/R&B (OCC)	6
US Billboard Hot 100	9
US Hot R&B/Hip-Hop Songs (Billboard)	6
US Rhythmic Airplay (Billboard)	18

=== Year-end charts ===
Chart (2017)	Position
Canada (Canadian Hot 100)	95
US Hot R&B/Hip-Hop Songs (Billboard)	52
US Streaming Songs (Billboard)	67

== Certifications ==
Region	Certification	Certified units/sales
Australia (ARIA)	2× Platinum	140,000^{‡}
Brazil (Pro-Música Brasil)	Gold	30,000^{‡}
Denmark (IFPI Danmark)	Gold	45,000^{‡}
Italy (FIMI)	Gold	25,000^{‡}
New Zealand (RMNZ)	Platinum	30,000^{‡}
Portugal (AFP)	Gold	5,000^{‡}
United Kingdom (BPI)	Platinum	600,000^{‡}
United States (RIAA)	2× Platinum	2,000,000^{‡}
^{‡} Sales+streaming figures based on certification alone.

== Release history ==
Region	Date	Format	Label(s)	Ref.
United States	May 16, 2017	Rhythmic contemporary	Young Money; Cash Money; Republic	
