= Two Birds, One Stone =

Single by Drake

from the album More Life (intended)
- Released: October 29, 2016
- Recorded: 2016
- Genre: Hip hop
- Length: 3:58
- Label: OVO Sound
- Songwriters: Aubrey Graham; Noah Shebib; Kanye West; Jordan Francis; Joey Castellani
- Producers: 40; Kanye West

Drake singles chronology
"Sneakin'" (2016)	"Two Birds, One Stone" (2016)	"Used to This" (2016)

"Two Birds, One Stone" is a hip hop song recorded by Canadian rapper Drake. It was released worldwide by OVO Sound on October 29, 2016. The song was originally meant for inclusion on Drake's fifth mixtape, More Life, however it did not make the final cut. Released in the wake of Drake's highly publicized feud with Meek Mill, it was co-written by Noah Shebib, Kanye West, and Joey Castellani, and produced by 40 and West.

The song gained notability and controversy as Drake uses "Two Birds, One Stone" to diss Kid Cudi and Pusha T.

== Background ==
In 2015, Meek Mill sparked controversy by his revelation that Drake was the recipient of a reference track from Quentin Miller, as Drake appropriated the track onto Mill's song "R.I.C.O." without giving Miller any songwriting credit. This labeled Miller as a ghostwriter for Drake, and the duo engaged in a feud as a result. Despite Drake and Mill responding to one another via diss tracks in 2015, additional replies to one another, either subliminally or through diss tracks, can be seen on Drake's 2016 album Views, as well as Mill's mixtape DC4.

While Drake and Kanye West were on the Summer Sixteen Tour and the Saint Pablo Tour respectively, former GOOD Music artist Kid Cudi criticized both Drake and West on his Twitter, stating that "[both men] are fake and cannot be regarded as legends", due to their use of ghostwriters. Drake and West both responded during their live shows, with many dismissing Cudi's action as a "desperate cry for attention". Meanwhile, GOOD Music signee Pusha T dissed Drake on the song "H.G.T.V.", further referencing Drake's usage of ghostwriters throughout the song.

== Remix ==
The song was remixed by British rapper Dave, premiering on the 35th episode of OVO Sound Radio on December 10, 2016.

== Lyrics ==
Drake primarily seeks to diss both Pusha T and Kid Cudi during the song, although some lyrics can be interpreted as toward Meek Mill.

Drake accuses Pusha T of promoting false stories of drug dealing in his songs:

But really it's you with all the drug dealer stories
That's gotta stop, though
You made a couple chops and now you think you Chapo
If you ask me though, you ain't lining the trunk with kilos
You bagging weed watching Pacino with all your niggas
Like, "This what we need to be on," but you never went live
You middle-man in this shit, boy, you was never them guys
I can tell, 'cause I look most of you dead in your eyes
And you'll be tryna sell that story for the rest of your lives

— Drake, "Two Birds, One Stone"

Drake also disses Kid Cudi, which lead to controversy:

You were the man on the moon
Now you just go through your phases
Life of the angry and famous
Rap like I know I'm the greatest
Then give you tropical flavours
Still never been on hiatus
You stay xanned and perked up
So when reality set in, you don't gotta face it

— Drake, "Two Birds, One Stone"

== Controversy ==
Drake received criticism in the manner in which he dissed Cudi, who checked himself into psychiatric rehabilitation for depression and suicidal urges a few days prior. Despite West appearing to squash the beef between him and Cudi by labelling Cudi as "his brother" and "the most influential artist of the last decade", Drake's remarks remained, later responding on his Instagram with the notion of continuing the beef between the pair. A few days later, however, Cudi responded to Drake on his Twitter, saying "Say it to face, pussy. You think it's a game. I wanna see you say it to my face. I'll be out soon. Promise."

In the aftermath of the song, Pusha T would make a response track titled "Infrared" aimed at Drake within his album Daytona. The same day, Drake released the song "Duppy Freestyle" as another diss towards Pusha T, as well as aim it at Kanye West, as a response to "Infrared." He also mailed to G.O.O.D. Music and Def Jam Recordings asking for a fee of $100,000 for "promotional assistance and career reviving." Four days later, Pusha-T released "The Story of Adidon" online for public listening. The single cover featured an image of Drake portrayed in blackface, which was shot by photographer David Leyes. The song itself, however, focuses on Drake's character and personal relationships, including the surprise reveal of Drake hiding a son named Adonis, whose mother was revealed to be a pornstar. Drake would expand on the topic in a couple of songs from his 2018 album Scorpion.

== Personnel ==
Adapted from TIDAL.

- Kanye West – production, songwriting
- 40 – production, songwriting
- Drake – vocals, songwriting
- Jordan Francis – songwriting
- Joey Castellani – songwriting

== Charts ==
Chart (2016)	Peak position
Canada Hot 100 (Billboard)	64
US Billboard Hot 100	73
US Hot R&B/Hip-Hop Songs (Billboard)	31
