= Gyalchester =

Song by Drake

from the album More Life
- Recorded: 2017
- Studio: SOTA Studios, Studio 306 and Four Seasons, Toronto
- Genre: Hip hop
- Length: 3:09
- Label: OVO Sound; Cash Money; Young Money
- Songwriters: Aubrey Graham; István Megyimorecz; Rico Brooks
- Producer: iBeatz

Music video
- Gyalchester on YouTube

"Gyalchester" is a song by Canadian rapper Drake from his mixtape, More Life (2017). The ninth track on the playlist, the song was written by Aubrey Graham, István Megyimorecz, Rico Brooks, and produced by iBeatz. The song features additional background vocals by Baka Not Nice, who is one of two credited musicians on More Life. The term is a portmanteau of the patois-spoken word for girl ("gyal") merged with the name of the Jamaican parish of Manchester.

== Commercial performance ==
=== North America ===
On April 8, 2017, "Gyalchester" entered the charts at number 13 and spent 19 weeks on the Billboard Canadian Hot 100. The song spent 11 weeks on the US Billboard Hot 100, entering the charts at number 29, its immediate peak, on April 8, 2017.

=== Internationally ===
The song has peaked in the top 40 in the United Kingdom and has charted on the charts of France, Ireland, the Netherlands, Portugal, and Sweden (Heatseeker).

== Music video ==
"Drake Shares "Gyalchester" Promo Clip in Anticipation of New OVO Store Opening" was released on August 2, 2017.

== Live performances ==
On May 21, 2017, Drake performed "Gyalchester" at the 2017 Billboard Music Awards.

== Charts ==
=== Weekly charts ===
Chart (2017)	Peak position
Canada Hot 100 (Billboard)	13
France (SNEP)	143
Ireland (IRMA)	44
Netherlands (Single Top 100)	83
Portugal (AFP)	68
Sweden Heatseeker (Sverigetopplistan)	1
UK Singles (Official Charts)	32
UK Hip Hop/R&B (Official Charts)	7
US Billboard Hot 100	29
US Hot R&B/Hip-Hop Songs (Billboard)	15

=== Year-end charts ===
Chart (2017)	Position
US Hot R&B/Hip-Hop Songs (Billboard)	83

== Certifications ==
Region	Certification	Certified units/sales
Australia (ARIA)	Platinum	70,000^{‡}
United Kingdom (BPI)	Gold	400,000^{‡}
United States (RIAA)	Platinum	1,000,000^{‡}
^{‡} Sales+streaming figures based on certification alone.
