= Casisdead =

UK MC, record producer and music video director

- Also known as: Cas, Castro, Castro Saint, C from T
- Origin: Tottenham, London, England
- Genres: UK rap; grime; cloud rap; electro; synthwave
- Occupations: MC; musician; record producer; music video director
- Years active: 2005–2007, 2012–present
- Labels: ImReallyDead; XL; DeadCorp
- Formerly of: Proper P
- Website: https://www.casisdead.com

Casisdead (stylised in all caps) is a UK rap and grime MC, record producer and music video director from the United Kingdom. He was born in London, possibly in 1986.

He began rapping in 2005 under the name Castro Saint, but retired the moniker in 2007 when he took a five-year hiatus from the music business. When he returned in 2012, he adopted the name Casisdead.

His debut studio album, Famous Last Words, was released on 27 October 2023 via XL Recordings. The album spent one week at number 7 on the official UK Albums Chart along with placing number 1 on the official UK Hip Hop & R&B Albums Chart.

In 2024 Casisdead won the Brit for the best Hip Hop/Rap/Grime Act at The Brit Awards.

== Music career ==
=== 2005–2007: Early years ===
Casisdead began rapping under the name of Castro Saint in 2005. During this period he penned, produced and released tracks such as "Adolescence", "C from T", and "Drugs". These songs were based on Castro's lived experiences in Tottenham and his gradual immersion into a narcotic-centred lifestyle. During this period he was involved in the grime community, both as a member of a group called Proppa Production and as a recurring guest in work by grime crew In da Hood. A bootleg collection of Castro's tracks is available on YouTube.

=== 2012–2013: The Number 23 mixtape ===
From 2007 to 2012, Cas did not release music or perform. He returned to music in 2012 using the name Casisdead. From that time Casisdead regularly collaborated with a group known as the "Dead Team", including creative director and in-house producer Cyrus (1iMediaGroup); DJ Mystry, the DJ of Cas' live shows; and Mr Ghostrain, a photographer and videographer. In June 2015, Dead Team member Renea "Mello" Campbell-Russell died at the age of 26. In an interview with Loud and Quiet magazine, Casisdead stated that the pain of Mello's death motivates him and the Dead Team to pursue their artistic vision.

In December 2013, Casisdead released The Number 23 mixtape which contains the majority of singles he had released in 2012 and 2013. The first music release of his comeback was the rap "T.R.O.N.", which was shortly followed by "Leon Best". The songs that comprise his 23 mixtape incorporate various musical styles such as grime, drum & bass, electro, jazz, soul, and that of the Bullitt film soundtrack. For the singles included from the 23 mixtape, Cas worked with several producers such as: Tre Mission ("Play"); Faze Miyake ("Play" remix); MssingNo ("Drugs Don't Work"); Skywlkr ("All Hallows"); and Jme ("Baraka" and "Cheese Slice" remix).

=== 2015–2016: Commercial 2 EP and singles ===
In September 2015, Cas issued a limited release of the Commercial 2 EP, which was only sold in cassette tape format via his website. Cas provided a further limited release of the Commercial 2 cassettes in December 2015 via his website.

Casisdead released the single "Simon" in January 2016 with an accompanying video. The track is produced by Skywlkr and the video is directed by Cas.

In May 2016, Casisdead released the upbeat single "Before This" with a highly stylised video directed by the rapper set around the domestic theme of grocery shopping and cooking. The track is a collaboration between Cas and Later – a duo comprising London producer Dominik Binegger and Norwegian singer/songwriter Linn Carin Dirdal.

Casisdead and Giggs have collaborated several times, beginning when Giggs appeared on a remix of Cas' "What's My Name?" in November 2015. The following year, Cas appeared on two tracks—"501 Hollow & Heston" and "Lyrical Combat"—on Giggs' album Landlord. Landlord also included the single "501", for which Cas directed the music video.

Cas featured on Tricky's 2016 EP Obia, where he appears on a reworked version of "Does It" (the single is originally from Tricky's False Idols album).

=== 2023–present: Famous Last Words and features ===
On 27 October 2023, Casisdead released his first studio album, Famous Last Words. Seven of the album's 23 tracks had been previously released as singles. Johnny Jewel and MSM have been identified as the album's primary producers, though a variety of other people have been credited for production on parts of the album, including Stranger Things composer Kyle Dixon. Famous Last Words has been described as "a work of vivid storytelling and dense world-building" that "marr[ies] '80s synth-pop influences with a bleak lyricism".

On 26 February 2025, Casisdead appeared on the track "Still The Same" by drum and bass artist Goldie. Released with a music video, the collaboration was the leading single from Goldie's album Alpha Omega.

== Music videos ==
Casisdead has directed several of his music videos. The artist has said that he perceives himself to be both, in equal measure, a music video director and rapper. Casisdead has directed the music videos for: "Cheese Slice"; "All Hallows"; "Charlotte"; "What's My Name?"; "Simon"; "Before This"; "501 Hollow & Heston"; "The XXIII – Weekend"; "The Grid"; and "Matte Grey Wrap".

== Critical reception ==
WordPlay Magazine praised The Number 23 mixtape, stating that they felt that it was "in the top 3 UK releases" for 2013. In May 2015, UK producer The Purist praised Cas as a rapper.

In December 2015, Mixmag compared the artist favorably to Mike Skinner and Giggs, stating that he was "quite possibly one of the best things to ever happen in British rap music." During a 2016 interview on US radio, Dizzee Rascal paid tribute to Casisdead, for being the "best lyricist and pristine".

In an interview with Global Rockstar Magazine in March 2016, Tricky lauded Casisdead for his originality stating.

During a 2017 interview with the Evening Standard newspaper, ASAP Rocky endorsed Casisdead as his favourite UK rapper, stating: "my favourite of all of them, my favourite UK rapper, [is] CASisDEAD."

== Personal life ==
Casisdead consistently wears a mask in his public appearances. He has described himself as having a variety of motives for doing so, including his creative passions, personal struggles, and his desire to retain his anonymity in a hyper-exposed world.

== Selected discography ==
=== Studio albums ===
List of studio albums, with selected chart positions
Title	Album details	Peak chart positions			
Title	Album details	UK	UK Ind.	UK R&B	SCO
Famous Last Words	Released: 27 October 2023; Label: XL; Formats: Cassette, CD, digital download, LP, streaming	7	4	1	28

=== Mixtapes ===
- The Number 23 (2013)

=== Extended plays ===
- Commercial 2 (2015)

=== Singles ===
List of singles, showing year released and album name
Title	Year	Album
"Seein' Double"	2014	Non-album singles
"What's My Name"	2015	Non-album singles
"Simon"	2016	Non-album singles
"Before This" (Later x Casisdead)	2016	Famous Last Words
"The XXIII – Weekend" (featuring Maso and KingRico)	2016	Non-album singles
"Too Much Drugs" (featuring Chase & Status)	2016	Non-album singles
"The Grid"	2017	Non-album singles
"Danger" (with Shola Ama)	2017	Non-album singles
"The Code"	2017	Non-album singles
"Pat Earrings"	2018	Famous Last Words
"Sugar Free"	2018	Famous Last Words
"Drive You Home"	2018	Non-album singles
"Park Assist" (featuring La Roux)	2021	Non-album singles
"Traction Control"	2022	Famous Last Words
"Matte Grey Wrap"	2023	Famous Last Words
"Venom"	2023	Famous Last Words

=== Guest appearances ===
List of guest appearances showing year released and album name
Title	Year	Album
"501 Hollow & Heston" (Giggs featuring Casisdead)	2016	Landlord
"Lyrical Combat" (Giggs featuring Casisdead and Dubz)	2016	Landlord
"Does It" (Tricky featuring Casisdead)	2016	Non-album singles
"Do it Again" (Mineo featuring Casisdead)	2017	Non-album singles
"Still The Same" (Rufige Kru featuring Casisdead)	2025	Alpha Omega
