= Landlord (album) =

Studio album by Giggs
- Released: 5 August 2016
- Recorded: 2016
- Studios: Lab Studios; Media Sharks Studios; MSM's Studio; Sensible Studios; Zephron Studios; (London, England)
- Genre: British hip-hop
- Length: 54:40
- Label: SN1 Records
- Producers: Giggs (also exec.); Boom Productions; Charlie Sloth; CRT; Danny Boom; Donae'o; Dukus (also exec.); Greatness Jones; Hayzeus; Jaisu; Mazza Beats; Nibz; Scott Styles; Sean Murdz; Smasher; Swifta Beater; Wizzy Wow

Giggs chronology
When Will It Stop (2013)	Landlord (2016)	Big Bad... (2019)

Singles from Landlord
- 1. "Whippin Excursion" Released: 21 July 2016; 2. "Lock Doh" Released: 26 September 2016

Landlord is the fourth studio album by English rapper Giggs. It was released on 5 August 2016 independently through SN1 Records. It succeeds Giggs's third album When Will It Stop (2013) and after parting with XL Recordings. The album features guest appearances from Stormzy, Donae'o, Youngs Teflon, CASISDEAD, among others. Production derives from frequent collaborator Boom Productions, Swifta Beater, Charlie Sloth, Danny Boom, Scott Styles, Smasher and Wizzy Wow.

The album was supported by two singles: "Whippin' Excursion" and "Lock Doh" featuring Donae'o.

Landlord received positive reviews from critics and peaked at number 2 on the UK Albums Chart, becoming Giggs's highest-charting and most successful album to date.

== Background ==
Giggs's third album, When Will It Stop was released in October 2013 and peaked at number 21 on the UK Albums Chart, becoming his highest-charting album at the time. The following two years saw Giggs releasing no solo material but making numerous guest appearances on high-profile songs, such as "Man Don't Care" with Jme and "3 Wheel Ups" with Kano.

In June 2016, Giggs announced the release date of the album through a teaser video posted on social media. The track list was unveiled the following month. According to an interview with Tim Westwood, Landlord was recorded in a broken period of two weeks, with the intention of releasing it to match the release date of his debut album, Walk in da Park (2008). It was completed without the intention of releasing an album, Westwood stating: "I went to the studio and did three songs at the same time, starting one, stopping and going to another, doing all three of them at once. Then when they was finished I was like “Rah, this is sounding like some album shit.” And then I went to studio the next day and made ‘Whippin Excursion.’ That week I made like six bangers."

== Promotion ==
On 21 July 2016 the lead single, "Whippin' Excursion", was released along with its music video and pre-order for Landlord. The single peaked at number 152 on the UK Singles Chart,

After popular demand, "Lock Doh" was released as the second single from Landlord. It peaked at number 52 on the UK Singles Chart, number 5 on the UK Independent Chart and number 12 on the UK R&B Chart, becoming Giggs' highest-charting single. In April 2017, the single was certified Gold by BPI Music with 400,000 sales.

== Critical reception ==
Professional ratings
Aggregate scores
Source	Rating
Metacritic	80/100
Review scores
Source	Rating
ClashMusic	6/10 stars
Crack Magazine	6/10 stars
Complex	Very favourable
NME	4/5 stars
SpiceUK	4.7/5
The Guardian	4/5 stars
The Independent	Very positive

Landlord received positive reviews from critics. It received a normalized metascore of 80 out of 100 on the review aggregate website Metacritic based on 4 critics, which indicates "generally favourable." Damien Morris of The Guardian described Landlord as "frighteningly good" and "fantastic, crafted, big-stage trap with the lissom, conversational feel of a mixtape. The clever use of features offsets that lugubrious voice with a pleasing range of articulate rappers; and the beats intelligently mix intimacy and claustrophobia, making Giggs’s grownup rhymes more authoritative than ever." Louis Pattison of NME commended the lyrical content, stating "Giggs’ delivery blends menace and sly comedy, while particularly choice lines are punctuated with a grunt, or a laugh so sinister it'd make the Grim Reaper soil his cloak."

Eto Worchie of The Independent gave a highly favourable review to Landlord, complimenting the authenticity of Giggs and solidifying his longevity: "Giggs gives us some vulnerability and greez here, reaffirming himself as The Boss in this album. Even eight years later he reminds us he’s still the same person and is still 100% authentic and 100% paying no attention to the industry" In a very favourable review, Jesse Bernard of Complex described Landlord as a "trap masterpiece" and "certainly a more cohesive effort than its predecessors [Let Em Ave It and When Will It Stop]".

== Commercial performance ==
Landlord entered and peaked on the UK Albums Chart at number 2, behind Blossoms by 9,500 copies. It became Giggs's highest-charting album, surpassing the peak of When Will It Stop (2013) which peaked at number 21. However, Landlord charted at number 1 on the UK Independent Chart and UK R&B Chart. The album also peaked at number 39 on the Scottish Albums Chart.

== Track listing ==
No.	Title	Writer(s)	Producer(s)	Length
1.	"Intro"	Nathaniel Thompson	Jaisu	3:35
2.	"The Blow Back" (featuring Stormzy & Dubz)	Thompson; Michael Omari; Dubz	Scott Styles	6:02
3.	"Whippin Excursion"	Thompson	Scott Styles; Sean Murdz	2:31
4.	"Just Swervin"	Thompson	CRT; Nibz	4:44
5.	"The Process"	Thompson	Greatness Jones; Wizzy Wow^{[a]}	2:54
6.	"Lock Doh" (featuring Donae'o)	Thompson; Ian Greenidge	Donae'o	3:09
7.	"The Best" (featuring Aystar & Youngs Teflon)	Thompson; Aystar; Jimmy Conway	Smasher	5:03
8.	"Slippin"	Thompson	Boom Productions	2:22
9.	"501 (Hollow & Heston)" (featuring CASisDEAD)	Thompson; CASisDEAD	Swifta Beater	3:42
10.	"Of Course" (featuring Rico Love)	Thompson; Richard Butler, Jr.	Charlie Sloth	4:55
11.	"Savage" (featuring Kyze)	Thompson; Kyze	Hayzeus	4:09
12.	"Lyrical Combat" (featuring CASisDEAD & Dubz)	Thompson; CASisDEAD; Dubz	Boom Productions	5:01
13.	"Clipped Him" (featuring Gunna Dee)	Thompson; Gunna Dee	Mazza Beats	3:48
14.	"The New Shit"	Thompson	Danny Boom	2:45
Total length:				54:40

Notes

- ^{^a} signifies a co-producer

== Personnel ==
Credits adapted from album liner notes.

- Art Goon – cover art, art direction
- Aystar – featured artist
- Bernie Grundman – mastering
- Boomblast – producer
- Buck – management
- CASISDEAD – featured artist
- Dirty Saj – recording
- Donae'o – featured artist
- Dubz – featured artist
- Dukus – executive producer, mixing
- Giggs – primary artist, executive producer, vocals, art direction
- John Schullman – engineer
- Gunna Dee – featured artist
- Kyze – featured artist
- MSM – mixing, recording
- Raye Cosbert – management
- Rico Love – featured artist
- Stormzy – featured artist
- Trenton Harrison-Lewis – management
- Youngs Teflon – featured artist

== Charts ==
Chart (2016)	Peak position
Scottish Albums (Official Charts)	39
UK Albums (Official Charts)	2
UK Album Downloads (Official Charts)	3
UK Independent Albums (Official Charts)	1
UK R&B Albums (Official Charts)	1
