= Sounds from the Other Side =

Studio album by Wizkid
- Released: 14 July 2017
- Recorded: 2014–2017
- Genre: Afrobeats; EDM; R&B; house; dancehall
- Length: 40:00
- Language: English; Yoruba; Nigerian Pidgin
- Label: Starboy; RCA
- Producer: Sarz; Del B; Spellz; Major Lazer; Picard Brothers; DJ Maphorisa; DJ Mustard

Wizkid chronology
Ayo (2014)	Sounds from the Other Side (2017)	Made in Lagos (2020)

Singles from Sounds from the Other Side
- 1. "Daddy Yo" Released: 23 December 2016; 2. "Sweet Love" Released: 2 March 2017; 3. "Come Closer" Released: 31 March 2017; 4. "African Bad Gyal" Released: 9 June 2017; 5. "Naughty Ride" Released: 23 June 2017

Sounds from the Other Side (abbreviated as SFTOS) is the third studio album and major label debut by Nigerian singer Wizkid. Described by the singer as an EP, the album contains songs that were recorded between 2014 and 2017. It was released on July 14, 2017, by Starboy Entertainment and RCA Records. Primarily a Caribbean-influenced record, SFTOS encompasses several other genres, including Afrobeats, EDM, R&B, and house. The album features guest appearances from Drake, Major Lazer, Chris Brown, Ty Dolla Sign, Efya, Bucie and Trey Songz. Its production was handled by Sarz, Del B, Spellz, Dre Skull, DJ Mustard, Major Lazer, and the Picard Brothers.

The album was made available for purchase and online streaming on several music platforms, including Apple Music, Amazon Music, Spotify, Deezer and Google Play. SFTOS debuted at number 107 on the US Billboard 200. It also debuted at number 58 on the Canadian Albums Chart. The album's release was preceded by three singles: "Daddy Yo" featuring Efya, "Sweet Love", and "Come Closer" featuring Drake. "African Bad Gyal" was released alongside the pre-order of the album on June 9, 2017, and "Naughty Ride" was released as a promotional track on June 23, 2017.

== Background and recording ==
Sounds from the Other Side was recorded between 2014 and 2017. Wizkid first announced plans for the album during a visit to Capital Xtra in October 2014. He told DJ Abrantee that the album's first single would be titled "African Bad Gyal" and would feature Chris Brown. According to The Fader magazine, English rapper Tinie Tempah and Beninese singer-songwriter Angélique Kidjo would also be featured on the album. In September 2015, Wizkid revealed he was dropping an EP and postponing the album's release. Since making this revelation, Wizkid has used the terms EP and mixtape interchangeably to refer to Sounds from the Other Side. In a video published on May 3, 2017, he told DJ Semtex he considers the album to be a mixtape while in another interview with Ebro Darden on Beats 1 radio, he called it an EP. Wizkid told XXL magazine he recorded "One for Me" and "Dutty Wine" with Ty Dolla Sign in Los Angeles. The latter song was completed in December 2016. He also said he recorded "African Bad Gyal" with Chris Brown in Los Angeles. In April 2017, Wizkid told BBC News that "Come Closer" was recorded around the same time as "One Dance", but was not released because the album was not ready.

== Critical reception ==
Professional ratings
Review scores
Source	Rating
YNaija	A
Pitchfork	7.4/10
Exclaim!	7/10
NotJustOk	6/10
Rolling Stone	3/5 stars

Sounds from the Other Side received generally positive reviews from critics. Writing for Rolling Stone, Brittany Spanos stated: "On his own, Wizkid turns his Afropop into a meeting point for a host of party-starting dance styles, getting a dancehall assist from Major Lazer on "Naughty Ride," bringing in Chris Brown for the reggaeton-inflected "African Bad Gyal" and hooking back up with Drake for the sensual "Come Closer'", giving it three out of five stars. Claire Lobenfeld of Pitchfork wrote: "Wizkid is primed to carry Afrobeats to great heights" and scored the album 7.4/10. Exclaim!'s Erin Lowers writes that Sounds from the Other Side hits the mark for catchy summer anthems, and pays tribute to the sounds that have subsequently carried Afrobeats across the world for the past few years." In a review for The Star newspaper, Davies Ndolo called Wizkid a "globalist" and said SFTOS is the singer's "most grounded and focused work yet".

Reviewing for HotNewHipHop, Maxwell Cavaseno said Wizkid "never sounds entirely out of place" despite the album being "thwarted by the misguided nobility of a hit-seeking agenda". Oluwatosin Adeshokan, a freelance journalist for YNaija, gave the album an A rating, describing it as a versatile project that marries a lot of sounds to "give a feel good vibe". Joey Akan of Pulse Nigeria described SFTOS as a "well-crafted, one-dimensional pop dance project that is all about vibes than actual substance". Sabo Kpade of OkayAfrica called SFTOS a "true afro-fusion album, well-balanced between world conquering ambitions and the culture whence it came". In a less enthusiastic review for NotJustOk, Tola Sarumi described the album as a "collection of songs that chart the artist’s travails from 'Ojuelegba' to now". Moreover, Sarumi said the album lacks "an overarching sound and feel" and that the other side is "essentially the listener".

== Accolades ==
Sounds from the Other Side won Best R&B/Pop Album and was nominated for Album of the Year at The Headies 2018.

Year	Awards ceremony	Award description(s)	Results
2018	24th South African Music Awards	Best African Artist Album	Nominated
2018	The Headies	Best R&B/Pop Album	Won
2018	The Headies	Album of the Year	Nominated

== Track listing ==
No.	Title	Writer(s)	Producer(s)	Length
1.	"Sweet Love"	Ayodeji Balogun	Sarz	3:23
2.	"Come Closer" (featuring Drake)	Balogun; Aubrey Graham	Sarz	3:31
3.	"Naughty Ride" (featuring Major Lazer)	Balogun; Clement Picard; Maxime Picard	Major Lazer; Picard Brothers	3:12
4.	"African Bad Gyal" (featuring Chris Brown)	Balogun; Christopher Brown	Sarz	3:25
5.	"Daddy Yo" (featuring Efya)	Balogun; Jane Awindor	Dre Skull	2:40
6.	"One for Me" (featuring Ty Dolla Sign)	Balogun; Tyrone Griffin, Jr.	Spellz	3:26
7.	"Picture Perfect"	Balogun	Spellz	2:30
8.	"Nobody"	Balogun	Del B	3:49
9.	"Sexy"	Balogun	Spellz	3:07
10.	"All for Love" (featuring Bucie)	Balogun; Busisiwe Nqwiliso	DJ Maphorisa	4:25
11.	"Dirty Wine" (featuring Ty Dolla Sign)	Balogun; Griffin, Jr.	DJ Mustard, Twice as Nice	3:01
12.	"Gbese" (featuring Trey Songz)	Balogun; Tremaine Neverson	Del B	3:01
Total length:				40:00

Notes

- "Sweet Love" contains elements of "Shakara (Oloje)", written and performed by Fela Kuti.
- "Naughty Ride" features an interpolation of "Ride Natty Ride", performed by Bob Marley and the Wailers.
- "One for Me" contains a sample of "You're the One", written and performed by SWV. It also features background vocals by Sevyn Streeter.
- "Sexy" features background vocals by Efya.

== Charts ==
Chart performance for Sounds from the Other Side
Chart (2017)	Peak position
Belgian Albums (Ultratop Flanders)	152
Belgian Albums (Ultratop Wallonia)	200
Canadian Albums (Billboard)	58
Dutch Albums (Album Top 100)	99
French Albums (SNEP)	140
UK Albums (OCC)	91
US Billboard 200	107
US Heatseekers Albums (Billboard)	5
US Top R&B/Hip-Hop Albums (Billboard)	47
US World Albums (Billboard)	2
