= KMT (song) =

Song by Drake featuring Giggs

from the album More Life
- Recorded: 2017
- Studio: SOTA Studios, Studio 306 and Four Seasons, Toronto
- Genre: Hip hop; trap
- Length: 2:42
- Label: OVO Sound; Cash Money; Young Money
- Songwriters: Aubrey Graham; Nathaniel Thomson; Courtney Clyburn; Cameron Shaikh
- Producers: Ness; Chef Pasquale

"KMT" (acronym for "Kiss My Teeth") is a song by Canadian rapper Drake from his album, More Life (2017). The song features a guest appearance from British rapper Giggs and was written by Drake, Giggs, Courtney Clyburn, and Cameron Shaikh. It was produced by Ness and Chef Pasquale.

The song saw commercial and critical success in the United Kingdom where it peaked at number nine on the UK Singles Chart and was later nominated for "Best Track" at the 2017 GRM Daily Rated Awards. "KMT" was additionally certified Gold by the British Phonographic Industry in the United Kingdom.

== Background ==
=== XXXTentacion controversy ===
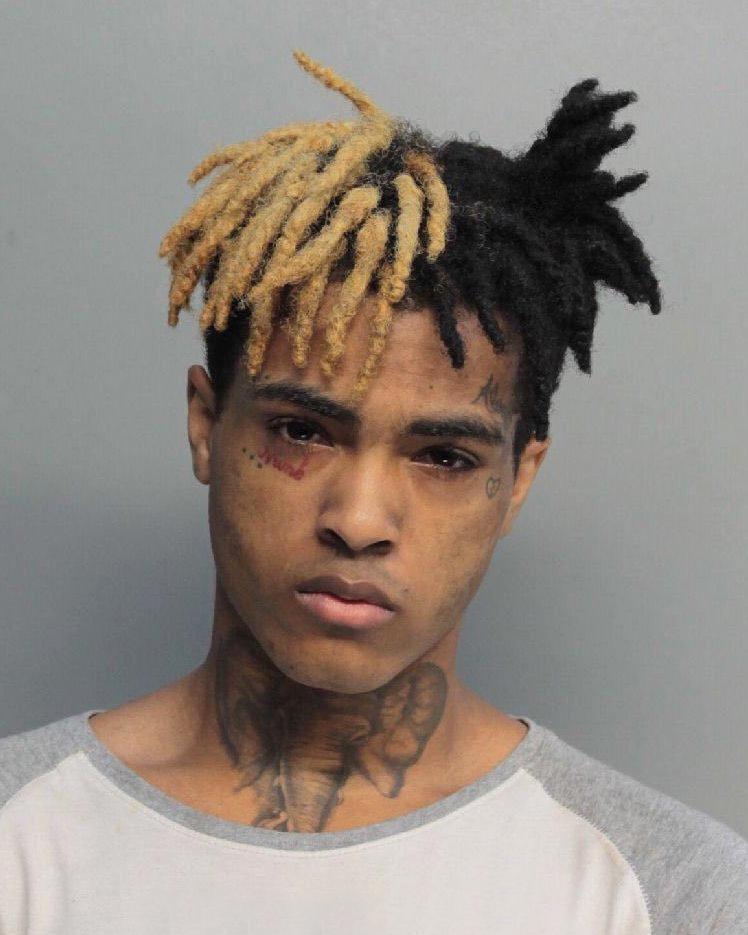
"KMT" drew comparisons to XXXTentacion's "Look at Me"

On January 28, 2017, "KMT" was previewed on stage by Drake during a concert in Amsterdam. The song was compared by users on social media to American rapper XXXTentacion's song "Look at Me" due to the similarity in flows, resulting in significant online controversy. While these events were taking place, XXXTentacion was incarcerated for battery charges.

After being granted parole, XXXTentacion was released from jail on March 26, 2017. Before appearing for an interview on Miami radio station 103.5 The Beat, he spoke with fans using the live video streaming app Periscope. During the interview with 103.5 The Beat, XXXTentacion claimed that Drake contacted a DJ that he had been associated with. According to the DJ, Drake was supposed to contact XXXTentacion's manager, but that did not occur. XXXTentacion also claimed that shortly after these exchanges took place, one of his friends contacted him during his incarceration and had shown him a live performance of "KMT" following comparisons to the similarity in flow from fans. XXXTentacion later joined his fans in accusing Drake of taking his style from "Look at Me".

Drake later appeared on an interview with DJ Semtex, where he addressed the controversy. Drake claimed that a few days after performing the track with Giggs he saw comments on Instagram accusing him of stealing XXXTentacion's flow. Drake maintained that he had never heard of XXXTentacion or his track, "Look at Me" prior to the controversy. He then goes on to explain that he searched for the song that was being referenced, and that he could see where people could draw the comparison.

=== Samples ===
"KMT" has two credited samples. One of the samples, "His World", was composed by Tomoya Ohtani and was performed by Ali Tabatabaee and Matty Lewis of the band Zebrahead. "His World" is best known as the theme song from the 2006 video game, Sonic the Hedgehog, which also serves as the theme of Sonic. When asked about the sample on Twitter, Ohtani said he was surprised and honoured that the song was sampled.

The other sample was taken from a live version of "Shutdown" by English rapper and fellow album collaborator, Skepta.

=== Reception ===
Vice magazine interviewed American listeners to see how they felt Giggs fit into the song. Interviewees said that a distinction between rappers from the United Kingdom as opposed to North America is that rappers from the UK focus more on the lyrics whereas North American rappers focus more on the flow. Multiple respondents said that Giggs' contribution did not work well with the track.

In another piece Vice claimed that Drake had to conform to American standards during his rise to fame and it was only recently that he had been able to incorporate Torontonian culture into his music. In GQ, it was further elaborated that the branding of the album as a "playlist" could be explained by Drake wanting to produce a project that was an incorporation of his favourite international artists. GQ went on to say that Drake's role in "KMT" was to introduce the song, and to let Giggs make it his own.

== Commercial performance ==
=== North America ===
On April 8, 2017, "KMT" entered the charts at number 25 on the Billboard Canadian Hot 100 and remained in the top 100 until May 6, 2017. The song spent two weeks on the US Billboard Hot 100, entering the chart at number 48, its immediate peak, on April 8, 2017.

=== Europe ===
On March 24, 2017, "KMT" entered at number 9 on the UK Singles Chart, becoming Drake's second-highest-charting song from More Life, after "Passionfruit" which peaked at number 3. "KMT" became Giggs' first top-ten entry on the UK Singles Chart. "KMT" also appeared on the UK R&B Charts and spent a total of 21 weeks on the chart, peaking at number 2.

== Charts ==
| Chart (2017) | Peak position |
|---|---|
| Canada Hot 100 (Billboard) | 25 |
| France (SNEP) | 183 |
| Ireland (IRMA) | 44 |
| Portugal (AFP) | 94 |
| Scottish Singles Sales (Official Charts) | 70 |
| Sweden Heatseeker (Sverigetopplistan) | 7 |
| UK Singles (Official Charts) | 9 |
| UK Hip Hop/R&B (Official Charts) | 2 |
| US Billboard Hot 100 | 48 |
| US Hot R&B/Hip-Hop Songs (Billboard) | 26 |

== Certifications ==
| Region | Certification | Certified units/sales |
|---|---|---|
| Australia (ARIA) | Gold | 35,000^{‡} |
| United Kingdom (BPI) | Platinum | 600,000^{‡} |
^{‡} Sales+streaming figures based on certification alone.
