= More Life =

Mixtape by Drake
- Released: March 18, 2017
- Recorded: 2016–2017
- Studios: Chris Athens Masters (Austin); Four Seasons; S.O.T.A.; Studio 306 (Toronto); Sandra Gale (Yolo Estate, California)
- Genres: Hip hop; R&B; dancehall
- Length: 81:42
- Labels: Republic; Cash Money; Young Money
- Producers: 40; Boi-1da; Chef Pasquale; FrancisGotHeat; Frank Dukes; G. Ry; Hagler; iBeatz; Jazzfeezy; Kanye West; Murda Beatz; Nana Rogues; Ness; Nineteen85; PartyNextDoor; S1; Steve Samson; Stwo; Supah Mario; T-Minus; Vinylz; Wallis Lane

Drake chronology
Views (2016)	More Life (2017)	Scary Hours (2018)

Alternative cover
- Original cover

Singles from More Life
- 1. "Fake Love" Released: October 29, 2016; 2. "Passionfruit" Released: March 28, 2017; 3. "Free Smoke" Released: April 18, 2017; 4. "Portland" Released: May 16, 2017; 5. "Glow" Released: June 6, 2017

More Life is the fifth commercial mixtape by Canadian rapper Drake. It was released on March 18, 2017, through Young Money Entertainment, Cash Money Records, and Republic Records. Described and marketed as a playlist, some publications have referred to it as a mixtape. Production of More Life was handled by a variety of record producers, including 40, Frank Dukes, Boi-1da, Murda Beatz, T-Minus, Nineteen85, and Kanye West, among others. An ensemble of guest vocalists also appear, including West, Young Thug, Giggs, Skepta, Quavo, Travis Scott, 2 Chainz, Jorja Smith, Sampha, and PartyNextDoor.

The songs on the mixtape feature a broad range of genres, including R&B, dancehall, grime, trap and Afrobeats. Supported by the singles "Fake Love", "Passionfruit", "Free Smoke", "Portland", and "Glow", More Life received generally positive reviews and debuted at number one on the US Billboard 200, earning 505,000 album-equivalent units. It was Drake's seventh consecutive number one album, and also broke several streaming records. Though a mixtape, it was named one of the best albums of 2017 by several publications. By the end of 2017, the mixtape had accumulated over two million album-equivalent units in the US.

== Background ==
Following the project's announcement, Drake described More Life as "a body of work [he's] creating to bridge the gap between [any] major releases". He further commented on the project during an interview with Complex, detailing his intention to "[create] a playlist to give you a collection of songs that become the soundtrack to your life". More Life was subject to many speculative release dates, with it initially set for December 2016. However, it was pushed back to January after Drake suffered an ankle injury on the Summer Sixteen Tour. Further dates were also rumored up until the official announcement in March 2017 of the project's release.

More Life borrows its name from a Jamaican slang phrase to wish someone well, popularized by dancehall artist Vybz Kartel, whom Drake has called one of his "biggest inspirations" for his own dancehall-inflected sound.

The last song on the record, "Do Not Disturb" mentions "Club Palazzo in the Bridge". This is a reference to a now defunct nightclub in the northwest Toronto suburb of Woodbridge, Ontario.

== Musical style ==
More Life has been characterized as hip hop, R&B, and dancehall with elements of grime, trap, Afrobeats, and pop.

== Artwork ==
The cover art of the project features a photo of Drake's father, Dennis Graham, taken in the 1970s. The photo is surrounded by a black border with the subtitle "A Playlist By October Firm" written below the photo. The original version of the cover art released in October 2016 on Drake's Instagram did not feature the black border or subtitle. Billboard's Tatiana Cirisano listed the album cover as one of the best of 2017.

== Promotion ==
More Life was preceded by three singles: "Fake Love", "Sneakin'" featuring 21 Savage, and "Two Birds, One Stone". The songs premiered on October 23, 2016, during Drake's thirtieth birthday edition of OVO Sound Radio. The episode also housed Drake's collaboration with Dave on "Wanna Know (Remix)".

Drake further previewed two additional songs on February 17, 2017, during appearances at the Paper Soho Club in London. On March 11, he announced the release date as March 18, via commercials released through Instagram. It initially premiered on the 39th episode of OVO Sound Radio at 6:30 pm. EST.

=== Singles ===
Do Not Disturb
A 30-second sample of Drake rapping Do Not Disturb.

The mixtape's lead single, "Fake Love", was released for digital download on October 29, 2016. The song was produced by Vinylz and Frank Dukes. The song peaked at number eight on the US Billboard Hot 100.

The mixtape's second single, "Passionfruit", was released to rhythmic contemporary radio on March 28, 2017. The song was produced by Nana Rogues. The song peaked at number eight on the US Billboard Hot 100.

The mixtape's third single, "Free Smoke", was released to rhythmic contemporary radio on April 18, 2017. The song was produced by Boi-1da, with additional production by Allen Ritter, while the additional music by Akira Woodgrain. The song peaked at number 18 on the US Billboard Hot 100.

The mixtape's fourth single, "Portland", was released to rhythmic contemporary radio on May 16, 2017. The song features guest appearances from American rappers Quavo and Travis Scott, while the production was handled by Murda Beatz, with co-production by Cubeatz. The song peaked at number nine on the US Billboard Hot 100.

The mixtape's fifth single, "Glow", was released to urban contemporary radio on June 6, 2017. The song features a guest appearance from American rapper Kanye West, while the production was handled by 40 and Kanye West himself, with additional production by Noah Goldstein. The song peaked at number 54 on the US Billboard Hot 100.

== Critical reception ==
Professional ratings
Aggregate scores
Source	Rating
AnyDecentMusic?	7.5/10
Metacritic	79/100
Review scores
Source	Rating
AllMusic	2.5/5 stars
The A.V. Club	B+
Consequence	A−
Financial Times	4/5 stars
The Guardian	4/5 stars
The Independent	4/5 stars
The Observer	3/5 stars
Pitchfork	7.8/10
Rolling Stone	4/5 stars
XXL	4/5

More Life was met with generally positive reviews. At Metacritic, which assigns a normalized rating out of 100 to reviews from mainstream publications, the mixtape received an average score of 79, based on 25 reviews. Aggregator AnyDecentMusic? gave it 7.5 out of 10, based on their assessment of the critical consensus.

Dan Weiss of Consequence said, "The singing and melodies are massaged with a care unheard in the prior Drake discography; this album flows as improbably as The Life of Pablo, with more assured lyrics and smoother sequencing, to offset the lack of a certifiable genius at the helm". Erin Lowers of Exclaim! said, "Excluding its minor gaffes, More Life cements a place for genres long-overlooked by mainstream media; dancehall, grime, Afrobeat, house, trap and, of course, rap, and takes Toronto on a world tour to celebrate life—More life". David Turner of The Guardian said, "Even if the album lacks the humor of the Views songs "9" or "Childs Play"—no line here bests "Why you gotta fight with me at Cheesecake / You know I love to go there"—the breadth of styles recalls his 2012–2015 SoundCloud that found space for both Fetty Wap and James Blake remixes". Clayton Purdom of The A.V. Club said, "More Life is light, often weightless. Despite its playlist tag, it is unmistakably a Drake album—it even has a Blueprint highball closer like each of its predecessors—and as an album, it is probably Drake's worst. But as a collection of totally atomized songs and ideas, it's up there with anything he's released". Preezy of XXL said, "While fans and critics argue over whether or not he's one of the greatest MCs of his generation, let alone among the greatest of all-time, Drake continues to prove his worth as an elite talent with More Life, another blockbuster from rap's golden child with the midas touch".

Andy Gill of The Independent said, "Pleasingly, two of the best [guests] are British, Sampha capping "4422" with an emotive outburst, and Skepta getting an entire "Skepta Interlude" to himself to muse about how he "died and came back as Fela Kuti". Elsewhere, the likes of Giggs, Young Thug and 2 Chainz add furtive but menacing sketches of thug life to tracks like "No Long Talk" and "Sacrifices", the latter offering Drake's most elegant mea culpa for past transgressions". Jayson Greene of Pitchfork said, "The more voices he lets into the frame, the fuller and richer the results, and More Life bursts with energy and lush sounds—more guests, more genres, more producers, more life. It is as confident, relaxed, and appealing as he's sounded in a couple of years". Rob Sheffield of Rolling Stone said, "More Life is his finest longform collection in years, cheerfully indulgent at 22 tracks and 82 minutes, a masterful tour of all the grooves in his head, from U.K. grime ("No Long Talk") to Caribbean dancehall ("Blem") to South African house ("Get It Together") to Earth, Wind & Fire ("Glow"). Yet the more expansive he gets, the more himself he sounds—and the further he roams around the globe, the deeper he taps into the heart of Drakeness". Scott Glaysher of HipHopDX said, "Other than the Yeezy collab "Glow" being a bit lackluster, primarily for being slow and sonically off-putting, More Life has very few stumbles and a plethora of exciting moments that will ensure this project's shelf life". Kitty Empire of The Observer said, "By definition, More Life has sprawl in-built, so judicious use of the skip function is required, but this is high-quality filler".

=== Year-end lists ===
Select year-end rankings of More Life
Publication	List	Rank	Ref.
Billboard	Billboard's 50 Best Albums of 2017	21	
Clash	Clash Albums of the Year 2017	31	
Complex	The Best Albums of 2017	10	
Exclaim!	Exclaim!'s Top 10 Hip-Hop Albums of 2017	4	
Noisey	The 100 Best Albums of 2017	7	
Pitchfork	The 50 Best Albums of 2017	38	
Rap-Up	Rap-Up's 20 Best Albums of 2017	6	
Rolling Stone	50 Best Albums of 2017	27	
Spin	50 Best Albums of 2017	49	

== Commercial performance ==
Worldwide, on the day of its release, More Life broke streaming records on both Spotify and Apple Music. The tracks of the album achieved a total of 61.3 million streams on Spotify in a single day, breaking the previous record of 56.7 million for ÷ by Ed Sheeran, in early March 2017. On Apple Music, the tracks of the album achieved a total of 89.9 million streams on the day of release (not including the number of listeners during the OVO Sound Radio debut of the album on Beats 1), setting the record of most streams of an album in a single day on Apple Music, as well as any single streaming service, and beating Spotify's number by almost 30 million streams.

On the chart dated April 8, More Life topped the US Billboard 200 and set a streaming record, earning 505,000 album-equivalent units, of which 226,000 were pure sales. The project achieved these sales figures in only five and a half days of sales as it dropped late on a Saturday. By the end of 2017, More Life had accumulated 2,227,000 album-equivalent units in the United States, with 363,000 being pure sales.

== Track listing ==
More Life track listing
No.	Title	Writer(s)	Producer(s)	Length
1.	"Free Smoke"	Aubrey Graham; Matthew Samuels; Allen Ritter; Marvin Bernard; Bryan Antoine; Daniel Sewell; Paul Bender; Simon Mavin; Perrin Moss; Naomi Saalfield	Boi-1da; Ritter^{[b]}; Akira Woodgrain^{[c]}	3:38
2.	"No Long Talk" (featuring Giggs)	Graham; Nathaniel Thompson; Shane Lindstrom; Kevin Gomringer; Tim Gomringer	Murda Beatz; Cubeatz^{[a]}	2:29
3.	"Passionfruit"	Graham; Nana Rogues	Rogues	4:58
4.	"Jorja Interlude"	Graham; Noah Shebib; Don McLean; Jorja Smith	40	1:48
5.	"Get It Together" (featuring Black Coffee and Jorja Smith)	Graham; Anthony Jefferies; Shebib; Nkosinathi Maphumulo; Busisiwe Nqwiliso	Nineteen85; 40^{[b]}; Stwo (outro)	4:10
6.	"Madiba Riddim"	Graham; Jefferies; Ryan Vojtesak; Adam Feeney	Frank Dukes; Nineteen85; Charlie Handsome^{[b]}	3:25
7.	"Blem"	Graham; Tyler Williams; Lionel Richie	T-Minus; Frank Dukes^{[c]}	3:36
8.	"4422" (featuring Sampha)	Sampha Sisay; Francis Nguyen-Tran	FrancisGotHeat	3:06
9.	"Gyalchester"	Graham; István Megyimorecz; Rico Brooks	iBeatz	3:09
10.	"Skepta Interlude"	Joseph Adenuga; Rogues	Rogues	2:23
11.	"Portland" (featuring Quavo and Travis Scott)	Graham; Quavious Marshall; Jacques Webster II; Lindstrom; T. Gomringer; K. Gomringer	Murda Beatz; Cubeatz^{[a]}	3:56
12.	"Sacrifices" (featuring 2 Chainz and Young Thug)	Graham; T. Williams; Dane Johnson; Tauheed Epps; Jeffery Williams	T-Minus; Deejae^{[b]}	5:07
13.	"Nothings into Somethings"	Graham; Ryan Martinez; Paimon Jahanbin; Nima Jahanbin; Edgar Panford	G. Ry; Wallis Lane; Nabeyin^{[b]}	2:34
14.	"Teenage Fever"	Graham; LaShawn Daniels; Marvin Thomas; Cory Rooney; Fred Jerkins III; Rodney Jerkins; Jennifer Lopez; Dave Santan	Hagler	3:39
15.	"KMT" (featuring Giggs)	Graham; Thompson; Courtney Clyburn; Cameron Shaikh	Ness; Chef Pasquale	2:42
16.	"Lose You"	Graham; Shebib; Steven Vidal	40; Stwo	5:05
17.	"Can't Have Everything"	Graham; Jaswinder Singh; Steve Samson	Jazzfeezy; Samson	3:48
18.	"Glow" (featuring Kanye West)	Graham; Kanye West; Shebib; Malik Yusef; Sakiya Sandifer; Philip Bailey; Noah Goldstein; Maurice White; Carlo Montagnese; Majid Al-Maskati; Jefferies; Ilsey Juber; Louis Johnson; Cydel Young; Kenza Samir; Jordan Ullman; Gabriel Garzón-Montano	40; West; Goldstein^{[b]}	3:26
19.	"Since Way Back" (featuring PartyNextDoor)	Graham; Jahron Brathwaite; Shebib; Martinez; Marques Hutchison; Michael Surio; Robert Kelly; Warryn Campbell	G. Ry; PartyNextDoor; 40; M3rge^{[a]}; TOPFLR^{[b]}	6:08
20.	"Fake Love"	Graham; Anderson Hernandez; Feeney; Brittany Hazzard	Vinylz; Frank Dukes	3:30
21.	"Ice Melts" (featuring Young Thug)	Graham; J. Williams; Jonathan Priester; Larry Griffin Jr.	Supah Mario; S1	4:10
22.	"Do Not Disturb"	Graham; Samuels; Ritter; Shebib; Snoh Aalegra; Leven Kali	Boi-1da; Ritter^{[a]}; 40^{[b]}	4:44
Total length:				81:42

Notes

- ^{^[a]} signifies a co-producer
- ^{^[b]} signifies an additional producer
- ^{^[c]} signifies an additional music contribution
- "Get It Together" features uncredited outro vocals by Burna Boy

Sample credits

- "Free Smoke" contains a sample of "Roll Up", written by Marvin Bernard, Bryan Antoine and Daniel Sewell, performed by Tony Yayo featuring Danny Brown; and excerpts from "Building a Ladder", written by Paul Bender, Simon Mavin, Perrin Moss and Naomi Saalfield, performed by Hiatus Kaiyote.
- "Jorja Interlude" contains an interpolation of "Doing It Wrong", written by Aubrey Graham, Noah Shebib and Don McLean, performed by Drake.
- "Get It Together" contains uncredited reworked elements of "Superman", written by Nkosinathi Maphumulo and Busisiwe Nqwiliso, performed by Black Coffee featuring Bucie; and an uncredited sample of "More Life", written and performed by Burna Boy.
- "Blem" contains an interpolation of "All Night Long", written and performed by Lionel Richie.
- "Teenage Fever" contains elements of "If You Had My Love", written by Rodney Jerkins, Jennifer Lopez, Fred Jerkins III, LaShawn Daniels and Cory Rooney, performed by Jennifer Lopez.
- "KMT" contains a sample of Sonic the Hedgehog's "His World"; and "Shutdown", performed by Skepta.
- "Glow" contains a sample of "Devotion", written by Philip Bailey and Maurice White, performed by Earth, Wind & Fire; excerpts from "6 8", written and performed by Gabriel Garzón-Montano; and excerpts from "Jungle", written by Aubrey Graham, Noah Shebib and Kenza Samir, performed by Drake.
- "Since Way Back" contains a sample of "Clipped Wings", written by Robert Sylvester Kelly and Warryn Campbell, performed by R. Kelly.
- "Do Not Disturb" contains elements of "Time", performed by Snoh Aalegra.

== Personnel ==
Credits adapted from mixtape's liner notes.

- Snoh Aalegra – backing vocals (track 22)
- Aaron Ahmad – assistant engineer (track 22)
- Harley Arsenault – engineer (tracks 9, 17, 21, 22), assistant engineer (track 20)
- Chris Athens – mastering engineer
- Baka Not Nice – backing vocals (tracks 1, 9)
- Black Coffee – vocals (track 5)
- Boi-1da – producer (tracks 1, 22)
- Noel Cadastre – engineer (tracks 1–7, 9, 11–20, 22)
- Noel "Gadget" Campbell – mixing (all tracks)
- Cubeatz – co-producers (tracks 2, 11)
- Deejae – additional production (track 12)
- Drake – vocals (all tracks)
- Charles "Bricks" Driggers – Young Thug vocal engineer (tracks 12, 21)
- Frank Dukes – producer (tracks 6, 20), keyboards (track 20), additional music (track 6)
- FLR – additional production (track 19)
- FrancisGotHeat – producer (track 8)
- Giggs – vocals (tracks 2, 15)
- Noah Goldstein – producer and engineer (track 18)
- Hagler – producer (track 14)
- Beres Hammond – additional vocals (track 21)
- Dave Huffman – assistant mastering engineer
- iBeatz – producer (track 9)
- Jazzfeezy – producer (track 17)
- Zoë Kravitz – additional vocals (track 3)
- Wallis Lane – producer (track 13)
- Supah Mario – producer (track 21)
- M3rge – co-producer (track 19)
- Gregg Moffett – assistant engineer (tracks 3, 16)
- MSM – engineer (track 10)
- Moodymann – additional vocals (track 3)
- Murda Beatz – producer (tracks 2, 11)
- Nineteen85 – producer (tracks 5, 6)
- Edgar Nabeyin Panford – additional production (track 13)
- PartyNextDoor – producer, vocals, and engineer (track 19)
- Chef Pasquale – producer (track 15)
- Ness Pasquale – producer (track 15)
- Noland Presley – 2 Chainz vocal engineer (track 12)
- Quavo – vocals and engineer (track 11)
- Allen Ritter – additional production (track 1), co-producer (track 22)
- Nana Rogues – producer (tracks 3, 10)
- G. Ry – producer (tracks 13, 19)
- Dirty Saj – Giggs vocal engineer (tracks 2, 15)
- Sampha – vocals (track 8)
- Steve Samson – producer (track 17)
- Travis Scott – vocals and engineer (track 11)
- Noah "40" Shebib – producer (tracks 4, 16, 18, 19), engineer (tracks 3, 16, 18), additional production (tracks 5, 22)
- Jorja Smith – vocals (track 5)
- Stwo – producer (tracks 5, 16)
- Symbolyc One – producer (track 21)
- William Sullivan – assistant engineer (track 18)
- T-Minus – producer (tracks 7, 12)
- Vinylz – producer (track 20)
- Young Thug – vocals (tracks 12, 21)
- 2 Chainz – vocals (track 12)
- Kanye West – producer and vocals (track 18)
- Finis "KY" White – 2 Chainz vocal mixing (track 12)
- Carl "Dennis" Willets – Giggs vocal engineer (tracks 2, 15)
- Akira Woodgrain – additional music (track 1)

== Charts ==
=== Weekly charts ===
Chart performance for More Life
Chart (2017)	Peak position
Australian Albums (ARIA)	2
Australian Urban Albums (ARIA)	1
Austrian Albums (Ö3 Austria)	9
Belgian Albums (Ultratop Flanders)	6
Belgian Albums (Ultratop Wallonia)	17
Canadian Albums (Billboard)	1
Czech Albums (ČNS IFPI)	6
Danish Albums (Hitlisten)	2
Dutch Albums (Album Top 100)	3
Finnish Albums (Suomen virallinen lista)	6
French Albums (SNEP)	5
German Albums (Offizielle Top 100)	7
Irish Albums (IRMA)	2
Italian Albums (FIMI)	14
Japanese Digital Albums (Oricon)	20
Latvian Albums (LaIPA)	71
New Zealand Albums (RMNZ)	3
Norwegian Albums (VG-lista)	2
Portuguese Albums (AFP)	15
Scottish Albums (Official Charts)	5
Slovak Albums (ČNS IFPI)	4
Spanish Albums (PROMUSICAE)	42
Swedish Albums (Sverigetopplistan)	3
Swiss Albums (Schweizer Hitparade)	4
UK Albums (Official Charts)	2
UK R&B Albums (Official Charts)	1
US Billboard 200	1
US Top R&B/Hip-Hop Albums (Billboard)	1

=== Year-end charts ===
2017 year-end chart performance for More Life
Chart (2017)	Position
Australian Albums (ARIA)	30
Belgian Albums (Ultratop Flanders)	85
Canadian Albums (Billboard)	3
Danish Albums (Hitlisten)	5
Dutch Albums (MegaCharts)	10
French Albums (SNEP)	79
Icelandic Albums (Plötutíóindi)	29
Italian Albums (FIMI)	76
New Zealand Albums (RMNZ)	15
Swedish Albums (Sverigetopplistan)	21
UK Albums (OCC)	8
US Billboard 200	5
US Top R&B/Hip-Hop Albums (Billboard)	2

2018 year-end chart performance for More Life
Chart (2018)	Position
Australian Albums (ARIA)	98
Belgian Albums (Ultratop Flanders)	121
Canadian Albums (Billboard)	27
Danish Albums (Hitlisten)	58
Dutch Albums (MegaCharts)	74
Icelandic Albums (Plötutíóindi)	99
New Zealand Albums (RMNZ)	47
UK Albums (OCC)	61
US Billboard 200	33
US Top R&B/Hip-Hop Albums (Billboard)	20

2019 year-end chart performance for More Life
Chart (2019)	Position
US Billboard 200	83
US Top R&B/Hip-Hop Albums (Billboard)	52

2020 year-end chart performance for More Life
Chart (2020)	Position
US Billboard 200	120

2021 year-end chart performance for More Life
Chart (2021)	Position
US Billboard 200	133

2022 year-end chart performance for More Life
Chart (2022)	Position
US Billboard 200	125

2023 year-end chart performance for More Life
Chart (2023)	Position
US Billboard 200	100
US Top R&B/Hip-Hop Albums (Billboard)	49

2024 year-end chart performance for More Life
Chart (2024)	Position
Australian Hip Hop/R&B Albums (ARIA)	49
US Billboard 200	167
US Top R&B/Hip-Hop Albums (Billboard)	64

=== Decade-end charts ===
Decade-end chart performance for More Life
Chart (2010–2019)	Position
US Billboard 200	48

== Certifications ==
Certifications and sales for More Life
Region	Certification	Certified units/sales
Australia (ARIA)	Platinum	70,000^{‡}
Canada (Music Canada)	2× Platinum	160,000^{‡}
Denmark (IFPI Danmark)	3× Platinum	60,000^{‡}
France (SNEP)	Platinum	100,000^{‡}
Germany (BVMI)	Gold	100,000^{‡}
Italy (FIMI)	Platinum	50,000^{‡}
New Zealand (RMNZ)	5× Platinum	75,000^{‡}
Poland (ZPAV)	Gold	10,000^{‡}
Singapore (RIAS)	Gold	5,000^{*}
United Kingdom (BPI)	2× Platinum	600,000^{‡}
United States (RIAA)	6× Platinum	6,000,000^{‡}
^{*} Sales figures based on certification alone.^{‡} Sales+streaming figures based on certification alone.
