= When Will It Stop =

Studio album by Giggs
- Released: October 11, 2013
- Studio: XL Studio (London, UK); Unit 10 (London, UK); Sarm (London, UK); Ameraycan (North Hollywood, California); Sensible (London, UK); Encore (Burbank, California); Paramout (Hollywood, California)
- Genre: British hip hop
- Length: 48:52 (standard); 57:35 (deluxe)
- Label: XL Recordings; Spare No1 Productions
- Producer: Giggs (exec.); Dukus Alemay (also exec.); Universe (also exec.); Bayoz Musik; Boom Productions; Pablo Productions; Sleep Deez; Virgo; DJ Farhot; Ed Sheeran; Jake Gosling; J.U.S.T.I.C.E. League; Mark Ronson; Tone P.; TRC

Giggs chronology
Let Em Ave It (2010)	When Will It Stop (2013)	Landlord (2016)

Singles from When Will It Stop
- 1. "(Is It Gangsta?) Yes Yes Yes" Released: September 9, 2013

Professional ratings
Review scores
Source	Rating
NME	3/5 stars

When Will It Stop is the third studio album by British rapper Giggs. It was released on October 11, 2013, via XL Recordings/Spare No1 Productions. The album features guest appearances from Anthony Hamilton, Ed Sheeran, Styles P and Kyze. When Will It Stop debuted at number 21 on the UK Albums Chart.

== Track listing ==
No.	Title	Producer(s)	Length
1.	"Intro"	Mr. Virgo	3:42
2.	"Gargoyles"	Mr. Virgo	4:50
3.	"Tick Tock"	Bayoz Musik	3:15
4.	"Play It Loud" (featuring Ed Sheeran)	Jake Gosling; Ed Sheeran	3:36
5.	"Best Pussy"	TRC	3:05
6.	"(Is It Gangsta?) Yes Yes Yes"	Mark Ronson; Tone P	4:06
7.	"Breathe"	Sleep Deez; Dukus (co.)	3:47
8.	"Coming For Me"	Boom Productions	3:22
9.	"Bring Him Down"	Sleep Deez	4:14
10.	"Eaaaaazy"	Pablo Productions	2:46
11.	"Mr. Kool" (featuring Anthony Hamilton)	J.U.S.T.I.C.E. League	4:31
12.	"What It Gets Like" (featuring Styles P)	Universe	3:27
13.	"Outro"	DJ Farhot	4:11
Total length:			48:52

Deluxe Edition
No.	Title	Producer(s)	Length
14.	"What Niggas Want"	Boom Productions	3:44
15.	"Burst" (featuring Kyze)	Pablo Productions	2:40
16.	"Monsta Man"	Bayoz Musik	2:19
Total length:			57:35

== Personnel ==
- Nathaniel Thompson – main artist, executive producer
- Edward Christopher Sheeran – featured artist & producer (track 4)
- Anthony Cornelius Hamilton – featured artist (track 11)
- David Styles – featured artist (track 12)
- Kyze – featured artist (track 15)
- Tali Aota – guitar (tracks: 4, 7), bass (track 7)
- Matthew Virgo – producer (tracks: 1, 2)
- Bayoz Musik – producer (tracks: 3, 16)
- Jake Gosling – producer (track 4)
- Jason "TRC" Lee – producer (track 5)
- Ernest Anthony Price – producer (track 6)
- Mark Daniel Ronson – producer (track 6)
- Sleep Deez – producer (tracks: 7, 9)
- Boom Productions – producer (tracks: 8, 14)
- Pablo Productions – producer (tracks: 10, 15)
- J.U.S.T.I.C.E. League – producers (track 11)
- Carl "Universe" Dennis – producer (track 12), mixing, executive producer
- Farhad Samadzada – producers (track 13)
- Dukus Alemay – co-producer (track 7), mixing (tracks: 1–15), executive producer
- Brian Knapp Gardner – mastering
- Phil Lee – art direction & design
- Hannah Blows – design
- Robbie Blundell – design
- Jeff Wack – illustration
- Alex Lake – photography

== Charts ==
Chart (2013)	Peak position
UK Albums (OCC)	21
