= Sneakin' =

Single by Drake featuring 21 Savage
- Released: October 29, 2016
- Genre: Hip hop; trap
- Length: 4:11
- Label: Young Money; Cash Money; Republic
- Songwriters: Aubrey Graham; Shayaa Joseph; London Holmes
- Producers: London on da Track

Drake and 21 Savage singles chronology
"Sneakin'" (2016)	"Mr. Right Now" (2020)

Drake singles chronology
"Fake Love" (2016)	"Sneakin'" (2016)	"Two Birds, One Stone" (2016)

21 Savage singles chronology
"No Heart" (2016)	"Sneakin'" (2016)	"Gucci On My" (2017)

"Sneakin'" is a song by Canadian rapper Drake featuring British-American rapper 21 Savage. Written alongside producer London on da Track, the song was released for digital download on October 29, 2016, through Young Money Entertainment, Cash Money Records and Republic Records. "Sneakin'" is one of three singles that Drake released simultaneously, alongside "Fake Love" and "Two Birds, One Stone".

== Composition ==
"Sneakin'" is a hip hop song with bounce influences composed in common time (4/4 time) and produced in A♭ major with a tempo of 85 beats per minute. The song was produced by London on da Track using Ableton Live. Entertainment Weekly highlighted the song's Atlanta hip-hop influence, calling it a "lurching ode to [Drake's] haters".

== Music video ==
The music video, which was directed by GAB3, was released on November 13, 2016, exclusively on Apple Music.

== Critical reception ==
Entertainment Weekly gave the song, along with "Fake Love" and "Two Birds, One Stone" a grade of B+, and commended its "vivid, open-book lyricism".

== Personnel ==
All credited as songwriters. Adapted from TIDAL.

- London on da Track – producer
- Drake – vocals
- 21 Savage – vocals

== Charts ==
=== Weekly charts ===
Chart (2016)	Peak position
Australia (ARIA)	81
Canada Hot 100 (Billboard)	20
France (SNEP)	180
Ireland (IRMA)	80
Portugal (AFP)	93
Scottish Singles Sales (Official Charts)	64
UK Hip Hop/R&B (Official Charts)	9
UK Singles (Official Charts)	52
US Billboard Hot 100	28
US Hot R&B/Hip-Hop Songs (Billboard)	8

=== Year-end charts ===
Chart (2017)	Position
US Hot R&B/Hip-Hop Songs (Billboard)	93

== Certifications ==
Certifications for "Sneakin'"
Region	Certification	Certified units/sales
Australia (ARIA)	Gold	35,000^{‡}
United Kingdom (BPI)	Silver	200,000^{‡}
United States (RIAA)	Platinum	1,000,000^{‡}
^{‡} Sales+streaming figures based on certification alone.
