= Don't Go There =

Single by Giggs featuring B.o.B

from the album Let Em Ave It
- Released: 20 February 2010
- Recorded: 2009 or 2010 (sources differ)
- Genre: Hip-hop
- Length: 4:55
- Label: Takeover Entertainment Ltd, XL Recordings
- Songwriters: Nathan Thompson; Bobby Ray Simmons Jr.
- Producer: Adam Cherrington

Giggs singles chronology
"Slow Songs" (2009)	"Don't Go There" (2010)	"Look What The Cat Dragged In" (2010)

B.o.B singles chronology
"Nothin' on You" (2009)	"Don't Go There" (2010)	"Don't Let Me Fall" (2010)

Music video
- "Don't Go There" on YouTube

"Don't Go There" is a song by English rapper Giggs featuring American rapper B.o.B, released from the former's second studio album Let Em Ave It. The single was released in the United Kingdom on 20 February 2010, as a digital download and is the first to be released following Giggs' signing with the record label: XL Recordings.

== Official video ==
On 11 January 2010, the official video for "Don't Go There" was released on YouTube.

== Track listing ==
Digital download
No.	Title	Length
1.	"Don't Go There" (featuring B.o.B)	2:36

== Chart performance ==
"Don't Go There" debuted at number sixty on the UK Singles Chart on 21 February 2010 ― for the week ending dated 27 February 2010 ― becoming Giggs' first Top 100 hit. The single also debuted on the UK Indie Chart and UK R&B Chart at number three and number sixteen respectively.

Chart (2010)	peak position
UK Indie (Official Charts)	3
UK Hip Hop/R&B (Official Charts)	16
UK Singles (Official Charts)	60
