= Baka Not Nice =

Canadian rapper (born 1979)

- Born: Travis Savoury; March 6, 1979 (age 47); Montreal, Quebec, Canada
- Origin: Toronto, Ontario, Canada
- Genres: Hip hop; trap
- Occupations: Rapper; songwriter
- Instrument: Vocals
- Years active: 2013–present
- Labels: OVO; Warner
- Website: bakanotnice.ca

Travis Savoury (born March 6, 1979), known professionally as Baka Not Nice, is a Canadian rapper and former security guard. He signed with Drake's record label OVO Sound, an imprint of Warner Records, in 2018.

== Career ==
Baka's career began as part of Drake's security team. He went on to contribute background vocals while working on his own solo music.

He can be heard at the end of "From Time" from Drake's 2013 album Nothing Was the Same. He also provided the outro to Drake's "Free Smoke" and backing vocals on "Gyalchester", both from the 2017 album More Life.

On June 27, 2017, he signed to Drake's record label OVO Sound and Warner Records, signing the contract in front of a crowd. Three days later, he released his first single "Live Up to My Name", co-written by Drake. "Live Up to My Name" peaked at number 77 on the Canadian Hot 100.

In 2024, as part of the publicised feud between Drake and Kendrick Lamar, Baka was name-dropped by Lamar in his "Not Like Us" diss track, described as having a "weird case", referring to Baka's criminal history. Baka responded on Instagram and expressed his support for Drake.

== Criminal history ==
In 2014, Baka was arrested and charged with forcing a 22-year-old woman into prostitution and taking her money. In 2015, he pleaded guilty to assaulting the woman and an unrelated weapons charge. He was sentenced to six months, but since he had already spent ten months in custody, he was not required to serve any additional time.

The woman refused to testify which led to the charges for procuring prostitution and human trafficking to be dropped. She was working as an escort and had an on-and-off relationship with Baka. She moved from Toronto by the time the trial was underway.

Baka has prior convictions for armed robbery, assault, discharging a firearm while committing a robbery, and possession for the purpose of trafficking. Upon his release, Drake would post, "A lot of good things happening at once. But this one means the MOST!!! Been waiting for 11 months!! Baka finally home!!!!!" (sic). He would later state "When [he] got out of jail there was a lot of different paths he could've took and he decided to focus on music."

== Discography ==
=== EPs ===
- 4Milli (2018) No. 78 Canadian Albums Chart
- No Long Talk (2019)

=== Singles ===
Title	Year	Peak chart positions	Certifications	Album
Title	Year	CAN	Certifications	Album
"Live Up to My Name"	2017	77	RIAA: Gold; MC: Platinum	4Milli
"Money in the Bank"	2017	—		non-album singles
"I Am Who I Am"	2017	—		non-album singles
"UP"	2019	—		non-album singles

=== Guest appearances ===
List of non-single guest appearances, with other performing artists, showing year released and album name
Title	Year	Other artist(s)	Album
"From Time" (featuring Jhené Aiko)	2013	Drake	Nothing Was the Same
"Free Smoke"	2017	Drake	More Life
"Gyalchester"	2017	Drake	More Life
"Talk Up" (featuring Jay-Z)	2018	Drake	Scorpion

== Filmography ==
Film and television
Year	Title	Role	Notes
2019	Remember Me, Toronto	Himself	Short film by Mustafa the Poet
