= Look What the Cat Dragged In (song) =

Single by Giggs

from the album Let Em Ave It
- Released: 6 June 2010
- Recorded: 2009
- Genre: British hip-hop, dirty rap
- Length: 2:36
- Label: Takeover Entertainment Ltd, XL Recordings
- Songwriter: Nathan Thompson
- Producer: Bayoz Muzik

Giggs singles chronology
"Don't Go There" (2010)	"Look What the Cat Dragged In" (2010)	"Hustle On" (2010)

"Look What the Cat Dragged In" is the third single from English rapper Giggs, released from his second studio album, Let Em Ave It. The single was released in the United Kingdom on 6 June 2010 as a digital download.

== Critical reception ==
Robert Copsey of Digital Spy gave the song a positive review stating:

Built around a simple but relentless synth riff, 'Look What The Cat Dragged In' has that knack of doing very little but still burrowing into your brain face-first like an earworm. Giggs's deep, distinctive delivery gives a semblance of weight to some very silly lyrics. There's stuff about gettin' the laydeez ("Wanna' lean in ma cockpit / Feelin' ma chopstick"), unprotected sex ("I done it bareback / I take chances"), boozing ("Courvoisier / Fillin' up eight glasses") and the eternal boobs/bum debate ("I'm a breast man but I rate arses"). It'd be a crime to take it too seriously, but there's something fantastically grin-inducing about a rap track so British yet so swaggering and comfortably assured.

== Track listing ==
Digital download
No.	Title	Length
1.	"Look What the Cat Dragged In"	2:36

== Chart performance ==
"Look What the Cat Dragged In" debuted on the UK singles chart on 13 June 2010 at number 53, becoming his second UK Top 100 single and thus his second single to miss out on the Top 40. The single also debuted at number 20 on the UK R&B Chart and number three on the UK Indie Chart, being beaten only by Fat Les and Dizzee Rascal, and remaining on the chart for a total of four consecutive weeks.

Chart (2010)	peak position
UK Indie (OCC)	3
UK Hip Hop/R&B (OCC)	20
UK Singles (OCC)	53

== Certifications ==
Region	Certification	Certified units/sales
United Kingdom (BPI)	Silver	200,000^{‡}
^{‡} Sales+streaming figures based on certification alone.
