= Big Bad (album) =

Big Bad...

Studio album by Giggs
- Released: 22 February 2019
- Recorded: 2018–2019
- Genre: British hip-hop
- Length: 68:55
- Labels: No BS; Island
- Producers: Joshua Ard; 6IXVI; Boom Productions; Cassius Jay; DaBeatFreakz; Dirty Saj; DJ Paul; DJ Snips; The Fanatix; Illadaproducer; Jahlil Beats; Jay Youngs; K-1; Labrinth; Machine Baby; Mazza; Raseye VII; Teddy Fantum; Swizz Beatz

Giggs chronology
Landlord (2016)	Big Bad... (2019)	Now or Never (2020)

Singles from Big Bad...
- 1. "187" Released: 21 February 2019

Professional ratings
Aggregate scores
Source	Rating
Metacritic	82/100
Review scores
Source	Rating
Clash Magazine	8/10
NME	4/5 stars
Pitchfork	7.4/10
The Guardian	4/5 stars
The Line of Best Fit	8/10

Big Bad... (stylised in all caps) is the fifth studio album by British rapper Giggs. It was released on 22 February 2019, via NO BS Music Limited / Island Records. The album features guest appearances from Gashi, Ghetts, Jadakiss, Kristian Hamilton, Labrinth, Lil Yachty, French Montana, Swizz Beatz, Theophilus London and Wretch 32. The album debuts at number 6 on the UK Albums Chart.

== Promotion ==
Part 2 of The Essence was released on 20 December 2019 and was inspired by the soundtrack of Big Bad....

== Track listing ==
No.	Title	Producer(s)	Length
1.	"Great Collectives" (featuring Gashi)	K1; Dirty Saj	2:56
2.	"Set It Off"	Da Beatfreakz	3:50
3.	"187"	Machine Baby	4:00
4.	"Baby"	The Fanatix	2:33
5.	"Spun It"	Dakarai Forbes; Mazza; Rasi Wellington	4:00
6.	"Mic Check" (featuring Jadakiss)	Jahlil Beats	3:03
7.	"Show Me Respect"	Snips	3:42
8.	"Talk About It" (featuring Kristian Hamilton and Theophilus London)	Teddy Fantum	4:30
9.	"Don't Go Hungry" (featuring Labrinth)	Labrinth	4:10
10.	"Run Me Down" (featuring Ghetts)	Illa da Producer	3:29
11.	"Nostalgia" (featuring Lil Yachty)	Cassius Jay	3:37
12.	"Hold Up" (featuring French Montana)	DJ Paul; TWhy Exclusive	5:05
13.	"You Ain't..."	Forbes	3:27
14.	"Who"	Dre Skull; Wildlife	5:20
15.	"Turnt"	Boom Production	2:45
16.	"Terminator" (featuring Swizz Beatz)	Swizz Beatz; Hal Ritson; Richard Adlam	3:57
17.	"Gwop Expenses" (featuring Wretch 32)	Snips	3:56
18.	"Shade"	Cool & Dre; 808-Ray	4:33
Total length:			68:55

== Charts ==
Chart (2019)	Peak position
Scottish Albums (Official Charts)	38
UK Albums (Official Charts)	6
