= No Long Talk =

Song by Drake featuring Giggs

from the album More Life
- Recorded: 2017
- Studio: SOTA Studios, Studio 306 and Four Seasons, Toronto
- Genre: Hip hop
- Length: 2:29
- Label: OVO Sound; Cash Money; Young Money
- Songwriter(s): Aubrey Graham; Nathaniel Thomson; Shane Lindstrom; Kevin Gomringer; Tim Gomringer
- Producer(s): Murda Beatz

"No Long Talk" is a song by Canadian rapper Drake featuring English rapper Giggs from his album, More Life (2017).

== Charts ==
Chart (2017)	Peak position
Canada (Canadian Hot 100)	14
France (SNEP)	124
Ireland (IRMA)	40
Netherlands (Single Top 100)	77
Portugal (AFP)	62
Scotland (OCC)	90
Slovakia (Singles Digitál Top 100)	80
Sweden (Sverigetopplistan)	92
UK Singles (OCC)	17
UK Hip Hop/R&B (OCC)	4
US Billboard Hot 100	40
US Hot R&B/Hip-Hop Songs (Billboard)	22

== Certifications ==
Region	Certification	Certified units/sales
Australia (ARIA)	Gold	35,000^{‡}
United Kingdom (BPI)	Silver	200,000^{‡}
^{‡} Sales+streaming figures based on certification alone.
