= Let Em Ave It =

Studio album by Giggs
- Released: 21 June 2010
- Recorded: 2009–10
- Studios: The Workshop, Canalon Studios (London, England)
- Genres: British hip-hop; hardcore hip-hop; gangsta rap
- Length: 71:22
- Labels: Takeover Entertainment; XL
- Producers: Giggs (exec.); Adam Cherrington; Bayoz Musik; Boom Productions; DaVinChe; Drumma Boy; Ensayne Wayne; J Bizzy; Kam Beats; Pablo Productions; SL; The Streets; Universe; Virgo; W Beeza

Giggs chronology
Walk in da Park (2008)	Let Em Ave It (2010)	When Will It Stop (2013)

Singles from Let Em Ave It
- 1. "Slow Songs" Released: 16 August 2009; 2. "Don't Go There" Released: 20 February 2010; 3. "Look What the Cat Dragged In" Released: 6 June 2010; 4. "Hustle On" Released: 28 September 2010

Let Em Ave It is the second studio album by English rapper Giggs. The album was released on 21 June 2010 under XL Recordings. It is the follow-up to his debut album Walk in da Park (2008). The album was supported by four singles – "Slow Songs", "Don't Go There", "Look What the Cat Dragged In" and "Hustle On", two of which charted in the top 60 of the UK singles chart. The album features guest appearances from B.o.B, Joe Grind, Gunna Dee, Starboy Nathan, among others. Production derived from Bayoz Musik, Boom Productions and Drumma Boy.

The album debuted at number 35 on the UK Albums Chart – at the time becoming Giggs' highest-charting album.

== Background ==
The album was recorded in London at The Workshop studio and also Canalon Studios. The album was mixed by London-based producer Gan Juan. The album will feature the single "Look What the Cat Dragged In" that was released on 7 June 2010. Giggs also released the single "Don't Go There", which featured B.o.B. "Slow Songs", which features Mike Skinner, was included on the album as a bonus track.

== Singles ==
- "Slow Songs" was announced as the album's first single but was not publicised. The song features The Streets. The track only features as a bonus song on the album and is not part of the official track listing.
- "Don't Go There" was released as the second single on 24 February 2010. It was expected to chart at a high position, but failed to make the UK Top 40 despite a large amount of airplay. The song features B.o.B. The track only features as a bonus song on the album and is not part of the official track listing.
- "Look What the Cat Dragged In" was released as the album's third single on 6 June 2010. It reached number 52 on the UK Top 100.
- "Hustle On" was released as the fourth single on 28 September 2010.

== Critical reception ==
Professional ratings
Review scores
Source	Rating
BBC Music	(positive)
MusicOMH	3.5/5 stars
NME	(8/10)
RapReviews	(6/10)
Soul Culture	3.5/5 stars

Let Em Ave It garnered generally positive reviews from music critics. James McMahon of NME gave high praise to Giggs' delivery of street tales while giving it a distinct UK flavour, concluding that "his second record is certainly a collection of stories this island has rarely heard told in one of its own accents". Adam Kennedy of BBC also gave praise to Giggs' bare-bones approach to gangster rap while still remaining as British as possible, concluding that, "Eschewing daytime radio hit filler, with menacing heat such as past single 'Look What the Cat Dragged In' stashed in his arsenal, Giggs certainly lets anybody who stands in his path have it."

Michael Cragg of MusicOMH said that despite Giggs' slow-paced flow and lack of interesting rhymes, he praised the production for giving elevation to the tracks, concluding that "Let Em Ave It isn't going to appeal to all rap fans, let alone the music buying public at large, but what it does do is introduce a major new talent to UK rap." Matt Jost of RapReviews found some of the material too reminiscent of other American rappers but praised Giggs' conversational delivery of the tracks for resembling Z-Ro's works, calling it "an album that very often sounds all too familiar but that still persuades with individual personality and local flair".

== Track listing ==
No.	Title	Producer(s)	Length
1.	"Intro"	Virgo	4:23
2.	"Hustle On"	Pablo Productions	4:06
3.	"Look What the Cat Dragged In"	Bayoz Muzik	2:33
4.	"The Way It Is"	Pablo Productions	4:13
5.	"Bus Commercial"	Boom Productions	3:28
6.	"Get Your Money Up"	Drumma Boy	3:44
7.	"Ner Ner"	Boom Productions	3:23
8.	"Reminiscing" (featuring Joe Grind & Gunna Dee)	Boom Productions	4:32
9.	"The Love Still There" (featuring Kyra)	Ensayne Wayne	4:37
10.	"Little Man and Me" (featuring ML Giggs's Son)	Bayoz Muzik	4:17
11.	"Life" (featuring Shereen Shabana)	Kam Beats	3:22
12.	"What More Do They Want"	Boom Productions	4:11
13.	"Matic" (featuring Gunna Dee & Y. Butch)	Universe	4:19
14.	"Signs"	SL	3:13
15.	"Up, Up and Away" (featuring J-Melo)	J Bizzy	4:25
16.	"Have It Out"	SL	3:13
17.	"All I Know (Get Your Money Up Remix)" (featuring Nathan)	W Beeza	3:48
18.	"Let Em Ave It"	Virgo	5:16
Total length:			71:22

HMV Limited Edition bonus disc
No.	Title	Producer(s)	Length
1.	"Don't Go There" (featuring B.o.B)	Adam Cherrington	4:56
2.	"Talkin the Hardest"	Dre	2:40
3.	"Blow Em Away" (featuring Shola Ama)	DaVinChe	3:44
4.	"Slow Songs" (featuring The Streets)	The Streets	3:13
5.	"Don't Go There" (featuring B.o.B) (Music Video)	Adam Cherrington, Adam Smith (director)	5:02
6.	"Look What The Cat Dragged In" (Music Video)	Bayoz Muzik, Adam Smith (director)	2:34
7.	"Slow Songs" (featuring The Streets) (Music Video)	The Streets, Sacha Khari (director)	3:28
8.	"Documentary" (Film)	Cherise Payne (assisted by Paul Marley, Edgie & Giggs)	9:00

== Chart performance ==
Chart (2010)	Peak position
UK Albums (Official Charts)	35
UK Album Downloads (Official Charts)	22
UK Independent Albums (Official Charts)	2
UK R&B Albums (Official Charts)	7
