= Passionfruit (song) =

2017 song by Drake

Single by Drake

from the album More Life
- Released: March 28, 2017
- Studio: SOTA, Studio 306 and Four Seasons, Toronto
- Genre: Tropical house; R&B; pop; dancehall
- Length: 4:59 (album version); 2:51 (UK radio edit); 4:18 (radio edit)
- Label: Cash Money; Young Money; Republic
- Songwriters: Aubrey Drake Graham; Nana Rogues
- Producer: Nana Rogues

Drake singles chronology
"No Frauds" (2017)	"Passionfruit" (2017)	"Come Closer" (2017)

"Passionfruit" is a song by Canadian rapper Drake from his playlist mixtape More Life (2017). The song was written by Drake along with producer Nana Rogues, and has additional vocals from Zoë Kravitz. "Passionfruit" was released on March 28, 2017, as the second single released from More Life after "Fake Love". It has been covered by Paramore, Mabel, Benny Sings, Yaeji, Cornelius, John Mayer, and Ben Tankard.

== Composition ==
"Passionfruit" has been characterized as tropical house, R&B, pop, and dancehall. It is performed in the key of G♯ minor in common time with a tempo of 112 beats per minute. Drake's vocals span from F♯_{2} to G♯_{3}.

== Commercial performance ==
"Passionfruit" entered the top ten of the charts in Canada, Denmark, France, Ireland, New Zealand, the United Kingdom, and the United States.

The song debuted at number 8 on the US Billboard Hot 100 on the issue dated April 8, 2017. This was the last song of the 431 weeks simultaneously on the chart for Drake. This record never broke after "Passionfruit" dropped off the chart. In Drake's native Canada, it debuted at number 2 on the Canadian Hot 100 behind Ed Sheeran's "Shape of You".

== Personnel ==
- Chris Athens – mastering
- Noel Cadastre – engineering
- Gadget – mixing
- Drake – vocals
- Zoe Kravitz – additional vocals
- Greg Moffett – assistant engineering
- Moodymann – additional vocals
- Nana Rogues – production

== Charts ==
=== Weekly charts ===
Chart (2017)	Peak position
Australia (ARIA)	4
Austria (Ö3 Austria Top 40)	25
Belgium (Ultratop 50 Flanders)	7
Belgium (Ultratop 50 Wallonia)	21
Canada Hot 100 (Billboard)	2
Canada CHR/Top 40 (Billboard)	6
Canada Hot AC (Billboard)	20
Colombia (National-Report)	74
Czech Republic Singles Digital (ČNS IFPI)	17
Denmark (Tracklisten)	5
Euro Digital Song Sales (Billboard)	11
France (SNEP)	7
Germany (GfK)	18
Hungary (Single Top 40)	37
Hungary (Stream Top 40)	15
Ireland (IRMA)	4
Italy (FIMI)	19
Malaysia (RIM)	15
Mexico Airplay (Billboard)	33
Netherlands (Dutch Top 40)	13
Netherlands (Single Top 100)	6
New Zealand (Recorded Music NZ)	2
Norway (VG-lista)	21
Portugal (AFP)	6
Scottish Singles Sales (Official Charts)	19
Slovakia Singles Digital (ČNS IFPI)	14
Spain (Promusicae)	51
Sweden (Sverigetopplistan)	7
Switzerland (Schweizer Hitparade)	12
UK Singles (Official Charts)	3
UK Hip Hop/R&B (Official Charts)	1
US Billboard Hot 100	8
US Adult Pop Airplay (Billboard)	39
US Dance Club Songs (Billboard)	34
US Dance Airplay (Billboard)	26
US Hot R&B/Hip-Hop Songs (Billboard)	5
US Pop Airplay (Billboard)	15
US Rhythmic Airplay (Billboard)	1

Chart (2026)	Peak position
Global 200 (Billboard)	137

=== Year-end charts ===
Chart (2017)	Position
Australia (ARIA)	66
Belgium (Ultratop Flanders)	68
Canada (Canadian Hot 100)	33
Denmark (Tracklisten)	36
France (SNEP)	122
Hungary (Stream Top 40)	93
Netherlands (Dutch Top 40)	79
Netherlands (Single Top 100)	64
Portugal (AFP)	57
Sweden (Sverigetopplistan)	90
Switzerland (Schweizer Hitparade)	91
UK Singles (OCC)	30
US Billboard Hot 100	65
US Hot R&B/Hip-Hop Songs (Billboard)	31
US Rhythmic (Billboard)	23

== Certifications ==
Region	Certification	Certified units/sales
Australia (ARIA)	7× Platinum	490,000^{‡}
Belgium (BRMA)	Gold	10,000^{‡}
Brazil (Pro-Música Brasil)	Platinum	60,000^{‡}
Denmark (IFPI Danmark)	3× Platinum	270,000^{‡}
France (SNEP)	Platinum	133,333^{‡}
Germany (BVMI)	Gold	200,000^{‡}
Italy (FIMI)	Platinum	50,000^{‡}
New Zealand (RMNZ)	6× Platinum	180,000^{‡}
Poland (ZPAV)	Gold	25,000^{‡}
Portugal (AFP)	2× Platinum	20,000^{‡}
Spain (Promusicae)	Platinum	60,000^{‡}
United Kingdom (BPI)	4× Platinum	2,400,000^{‡}
United States (RIAA)	Diamond	10,000,000^{‡}
^{‡} Sales+streaming figures based on certification alone.

== Release history ==
Region	Date	Format	Label(s)	Ref.
United States	March 28, 2017	Rhythmic contemporary	Young Money; Cash Money; Republic	
