= Giggs (rapper) =

British rapper (born 1981)

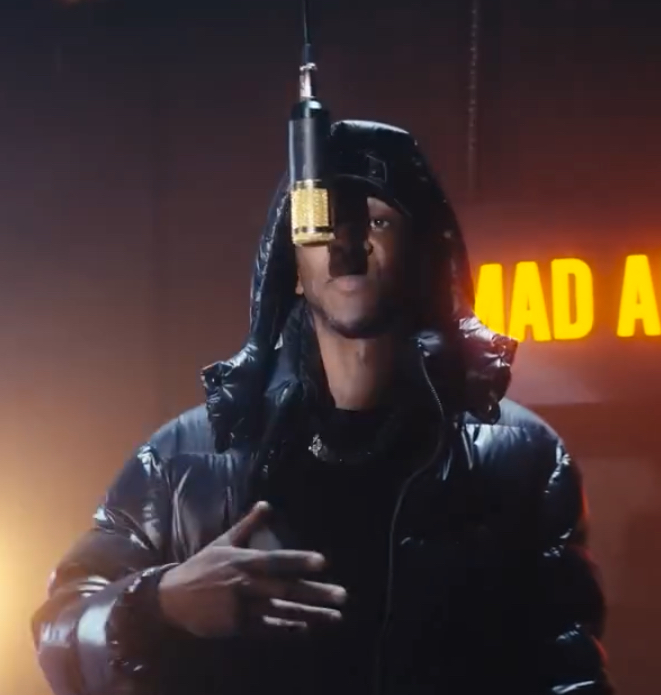
- Giggs in 2023

Background information
- Also known as: Hollowman
- Born: Jason Neville Thompson; 11 May 1981 (age 45); Peckham, London, England
- Genres: British hip-hop; road rap
- Occupations: Rapper; songwriter
- Instrument: Vocals
- Years active: 2005–present
- Labels: SN1; NO BS; Island; Takeover; XL
- Website: sn1giggs.com

Jason Neville "Nathaniel" Thompson (born 11 May 1981), known professionally as Giggs, is a British rapper from Peckham, London. He self-released his debut studio album Walk in da Park (2008), and signed with Takeover Entertainment to release its follow-up Let Em Ave It (2009).

Giggs' third studio album When Will It Stop (2013), was followed by his fourth album Landlord (2016), which entered and peaked at number 2 on the UK Albums Chart – becoming the highest-charting album of his career, tied with his mixtape Wamp 2 Dem (2017), which also debuted at No. 2. It was followed by his fifth album, Now or Never (2020). Giggs is also the frontman and founder of record label and rap collective SN1 (Spare No 1), which includes Gunna Dee, Joe Grind, Kyze and Tiny Boost.

While often referred to as a grime MC, Giggs has repeatedly stated the music he makes is not grime, but rather falls under the UK rap umbrella.

== Personal life ==
Growing up as a teenager, Giggs was a DJ in Peckham, predominantly playing reggae, ragga and dancehall. He also had his own pirate radio station called "Spare No One FM".

Giggs is a father; his oldest son raps under the stage name ML and has collaborated with him on multiple songs including the "Own Motion" remix in 2025. He has several children with autism, whose experiences led him to discover his own late diagnosis, and in 2025 he spoke on Newsnight about the difficulties he has faced in securing Education, Health and Care Plans for his younger children.

== Music career ==
=== 2005–2008: Career beginnings and Walk in da Park ===
Giggs' stage name is derived from his childhood nickname of Giggler, and on some of his earliest releases he was also credited as Gig. After deciding to pursue a music career, he released numerous mixtapes including Hollowman Meets Blade which featured Blade Brown, Welcome to Boomzville, Best of Giggs 1 and 2 and 3 and Ard Bodied, which featured Dubz. His mixtapes have supposedly sold more than 10,000 units. This success helped his popularity expand outside London.

In 2007, Giggs released the track "Talkin' da Hardest", which featured Giggs rapping over the instrumental of Stat Quo's song "Here We Go" originally produced by Dr. Dre. "Talkin' da Hardest" was later certified silver after it was officially released. In 2008 he released his debut album Walk in da Park independently. This album helped Giggs' popularity expand outside London and in 2008 he was nominated for the BET Awards in the US for Best Hip-Hop Act: UK. Giggs won the award beating out more established acts at the time.

=== 2009–2012: Let Em Ave It ===
In August 2009, Giggs signed a record deal with XL Recordings.

Giggs released Let Em Ave It in 2009 and singles released from that album include "Slow Songs" featuring Mike Skinner, "Look What The Cat Dragged In" and "Don't Go There" featuring American rapper B.o.B. At the Reading Festival in 2010, Giggs appeared on BBC Three, which was his first television appearance, performing his single "Look What The Cat Dragged In". That year he also appeared on Tinchy Stryder's single "Game Over" Alongside Chipmunk, Devlin, Example, Tinie Tempah and Professor Green. The single charted at No. 21 in the Official UK Singles Chart. This year he was nominated at the MOBO awards in the Best UK Hip Hop/Grime category. He was then nominated again for the same award in 2011.

=== 2013–2014: When Will It Stop ===
In 2013, Giggs released the album When Will It Stop. The album featured artists such as Ed Sheeran and Styles P. It debuted at number 21 on the UK Albums Chart, becoming his highest-charting album at the time.

=== 2015–2018: Landlord and Wamp 2 Dem ===
As Giggs geared up for the release of his album Landlord he featured on many records. Two notable records were "Man Don't Care" by JME and "Three Wheel Ups" by Kano, also featuring Wiley. "Man Don't Care" went on to be certified Platinum in the UK by the BPI whilst "Three Wheel Ups" was certified silver.

On 5 August 2016, Giggs released his fourth studio album Landlord independently on SN1 Records. The album features guest appearances from Stormzy, Rico Love, Donae'o and more. It was received well and garnered very positive reviews. Landlord became Giggs' highest entry on the UK Albums Chart, debuting at number two. The album was preceded by the lead single "Whippin Excursion" and followed up with the club-themed "Lock Doh", which achieved a Platinum certification from the BPI in March 2018, "Whipping Excursion" also went on to be certified silver. The album Landlord also went on to be certified silver by the BPI. Landlord was nominated for Best Album at the 2016 MOBO Awards.

Also in 2016, Giggs was nominated for several awards at the KA & GRM Daily Rated Awards. On the night he walked away with the Artist of the Year Award. This year he was also nominated for two MOBO awards. Best Rap/Hip-Hop and Best Album.

In March 2017, Giggs was featured on two songs from Canadian rapper Drake's album More Life, "No Long Talk" and "KMT". "KMT" peaked at No.9 on the UK Singles Chart whilst "No Long Talk" peaked at 17. "KMT" is certified Platinum in the UK by the BPI and "No Long Talk" is certified silver.

Giggs was nominated for Best Hip Hop at the 2017 MOBO Awards, which he went on to win. He was also nominated for Best International Act: Europe at the 2017 BET Awards.

On 6 October 2017, Giggs released a new mixtape entitled Wamp 2 Dem. Despite also being offered as a free download, the project sold enough units to enter the UK Albums Chart at number two, making it his joint highest-charting release. Giggs released "Linguo" featuring Donae'O as the only single from the project, it peaked at No. 28 on the UK singles chart and would later be certified silver by the BPI. The songs 'Peligro' ft. Dave and 'The Essence' from the project are also certified silver.

Giggs collaborator Drake was a surprise headline act at Wireless 2018 in London, filling in for DJ Khaled. Drake would come out right after Giggs' Wireless set, as they performed KMT for the second time in the UK. They first performed KMT at Reading Festival, where Giggs brought out Drake as a surprise guest.

=== 2019–2020: Big Bad and Now or Never ===
Giggs announced his new album "Big Bad" via YouTube on 7 January 2019, with a 2-minute trailer. This features Giggs attacking London whilst "187" is heard in the background. The second part of his YouTube film The Essence was inspired by the soundtrack of Big Bad. It was released on 22 February 2019. Big Bad debuted and peaked at No. 6 in the UK charts. The single 'Baby' from the project went on to be certified silver by the BPI.

On 6 November 2020, Giggs released a surprise mixtape called Now or Never. It consisted of 16 tracks, with features including Dave, Jorja Smith, A Boogie wit da Hoodie, Kyze, Aystar, Tiny Boost, DeMarco, Obongjayar and Emeli Sandé. The mixtape debuted and peaked at No. 15 in the UK Charts, and spawned a top 40 hit with 'Straight Murder (Giggs & David)' which peaked at 35 in the UK Charts.

== Legal issues ==
Giggs was convicted for possession of a firearm in 2003, and sentenced to two years and eight months in prison. In February 2012, police searched a car Giggs was in and found an illegal firearm; Giggs spent six months remanded in custody, despite the driver admitting to owning the gun, as police accused Giggs of being aware of the firearm. Giggs was acquitted on all charges.

Giggs often experienced venues cancelling events he was scheduled to appear at mere hours before the performance. Giggs was dropped as support act for Lil Wayne before a 2006 tour without explanation. These incidents have been linked to actions of the Metropolitan Police Service, who have been said to have specifically targeted Giggs. Giggs believes that they "must have called the venues and threatened them with taking away their licences". In 2010, he said that "every single thing I do that's supposed to be positive, they fuck it up for me". In 2013, he stated: "I don't want to get caught up in whose fault it is, or whether the police are after me [...] I'm just happy to be making music again".

In 2009, the Metropolitan Police wrote to XL strongly advising the label not to sign Giggs, though they did anyway. A 2010 tour planned by Giggs was cancelled due to police warnings. In 2013, Giggs' London performance of material from When Will It Stop was cancelled by police, after they had given him the go-ahead. Giggs responded in a video publicly apologising to fans, reimbursing them for tickets, and sarcastically praising the police's attempts to "slow [him] down".

== Business ventures ==
In 2010, Giggs opened up his own CD record & clothes shop called "The SN1 Shop" in Peckham. In 2024, Giggs became the ambassador of the dairy-free custard brand Oatly, sponsoring a free giveaway of cake and custard at Ayres Bakery, Nunhead.

== Philanthropy ==
Giggs teamed up with education charity the OMG Foundation, to launch St James House, a secondary school for pupils with special educational needs and disabilities (SEND) and those in alternative provision, in Gravesend, Kent.>

== Discography ==
=== Studio albums ===
- Walk in da Park (2008)
- Let Em Ave It (2010)
- When Will It Stop (2013)
- Landlord (2016)
- Big Bad... (2019)
- Zero Tolerance (2023)

=== Commercial mixtapes ===
- Wamp 2 Dem (2017)
- Now or Never (2020)

== Awards and nominations ==
Year	Region	Ceremony	Category	Result
2008	United States	BET Awards	Best Hip Hop Act: UK	Won
2010	United Kingdom	MOBO Awards	Best UK Hip Hop/Grime Act	Nominated
2011	United Kingdom	MOBO Awards	Best Hip Hop/Grime Act	Nominated
2016	United Kingdom	MOBO Awards	Best Hip Hop Act	Nominated
2016	United Kingdom	MOBO Awards	Best Album	Nominated
2017	United States	BET Awards	Best International Act: Europe	Nominated
2017	United Kingdom	MOBO Awards	Best Hip Hop Act	Won
2019	United Kingdom	BRIT Awards	Best Male	Nominated
2019	United States	BET Awards	Best International Act: Europe	Nominated

== Filmography ==
Filmography
Year	Title	Role	Notes
2011	Victim	Fat Justin	Supporting role
2011	Anuvahood	Nephew	Cameo appearance
2019–2020	The Essence	N.T.	Three-part short YouTube series; inspired by his albums Wamp 2 Dem, Big Bad and Now or Never
