= Walk in da Park =

Studio album by Giggs
- Released: 4 August 2008
- Recorded: 2008
- Studios: Unit 10 Studios (London, England)
- Genres: British hip hop; gangsta rap; road rap
- Length: 70:18
- Label: SN1 Records
- Producers: Giggs (exec.); Universe (also exec.); Bayoz Muzik; Boom Productions; Boss Entertainment; Dash Music; Flupes; Simple; Wbeeza

Giggs chronology
Walk in da Park (2008)	Let Em Ave It (2010)

Walk in da Park is the debut album by English rapper Giggs. It was released on 4 August 2008 independently through SN1 Records. It is Giggs' first commercial release after putting out a collection of mixtapes from 2005 onwards. The album includes guest appearances from SN1 members Joe Grind, Gunna, Kyze and Gunna D, among others. Production was handled by frequent in-house producers Boom Productions, Bayoz Muzik and others. Walk in da Park incorporates British hip hop with road rap and gangsta rap alongside aggressive flows and production.

The album entered the UK R&B Chart at number 13 and number 9 on the UK Independent Chart, selling thousands of independently-pressed copies and selling out in music stores. Walk in da Park was positively received by music critics.

Since its initial release, Walk in da Park has been recognised as an influential release for British hip hop, spawning the subgenre of road rap while introducing slower flows that contrasted the fast-paced grime flows that were significantly popular at the time.

== Background ==
In 2007, Giggs released the song "Montague", leading to increased buzz for Giggs and his music. This was followed up by "Talkin' da Hardest", a freestyle over Stat Quo's song "Here We Go", produced by Dr. Dre. The freestyle and its music video proved to be an underground success and became a British rap cult classic. However, neither song were included in the track listing of the album. According to Giggs, Walk in da Park was recorded and completed within two weeks.

Giggs released a video for the song "Uummm!!" for promotion before the album was released, however MTV Base refused to play the video due to claims that the content was too strong for their channel. Radio channels also banned Giggs' music from airplay. In response to the bans, Giggs retracted his video application and wrote the tune "The Last Straw", produced by Track Dealer (Track on the Beat), directed towards the bad treatment he received from MTV Base and BBC Radio 1Xtra. When asked about the issue he said he was asked to censor "drug references" from the song, despite none being made.

DJs such as Tim Westwood are known to hold this album in high regard, despite Giggs being blacklisted from BBC 1Xtra.

The underground success of the album led to Giggs signing to XL Recordings, and the release of his sophomore album Let Em Ave It (2010).

== Track listing ==
Walk in da Park
No.	Title	Producer(s)	Length
1.	"Intro (B.B.T.)"	Boom Productions	4:20
2.	"Uummm!!!"	Wbeeza	3:49
3.	"Open Up"	Bayoz Muzik	2:56
4.	"Who Are You to Judge?" (featuring Joe Grind)	Boom Productions	4:24
5.	"More Maniacs" (featuring T.Boost and Young Spray)	Boom Productions	3:43
6.	"Swagga!!" (featuring Joe Grind)	Boom Productions	4:39
7.	"Cut Up Bag"	Boss Entertainment	4:21
8.	"Saw"	Boom Productions	3:36
9.	"Make It Look Good" (featuring J. Melo)	Boom Productions	4:26
10.	"Click Clack!!!" (featuring Killa Ki & Shocks)	Universe	4:06
11.	"Pitchin' All da Time" (featuring Dubz and Chelsi Lauren)	Flupes	5:20
12.	"Rat-A-Tat-Tat" (featuring Kyze)	Simple	3:36
13.	"Tempa Tempa" (featuring T.G.)	Bayoz Muzik	3:16
14.	"Bring a Message Back"	Boom Productions	3:04
15.	"You Raised Me"	Boom Productions	2:51
16.	"Walk in da Park" (featuring O.T.B)	Boom Productions	3:47
17.	"Let 'Im Ave It" (featuring T.Boost)	Flupes	3:33
18.	"Test Out da Nine (Remix)" (featuring SN1)	Boom Productions	4:57
Total length:			70:18

== Personnel ==
Credits adapted from AllMusic.

- Giggs – primary artist, executive producer, composer
- Bayoz Muzik – producer
- Boost – featured artist, composer, engineer, mixing
- Carl "Universe" Dennis – executive producer, engineer, mixing
- Dubz – featured artist, composer
- Fix Dot'm – composer
- J Melo – featured artist, composer
- Joe Grind – featured artist, composer, engineer, mixing
- Killa Ki – featured artist, composer
- Kyze – featured artist, composer, engineer, mixing
- Chelsi Lauren – featured artist, composer
- O.T.B. – featured artist
  - Buck – vocals (track 16)
  - Fix Dot'M – vocals (track 16)
- Shocks – featured artist
- SN1 – featured artist
  - Joe Grind – vocals (track 18)
  - Kyzer – vocals (track 18)
  - Gunna D – vocals (track 18)
  - T.Boost – vocals (track 5, 17, 18)
- Wbeeza – producer
- Young Spray – featured artist, composer

== Charts ==
Chart (2008)	Peak position
UK Albums (Official Charts)	143
UK Independent Albums (Official Charts)	9
UK R&B Albums (Official Charts)	13
