= Best of Bizzle =

Compilation album by Lethal Bizzle
- Released: February 27, 2011
- Recorded: 2004–2011
- Genre: Grime
- Length: 89:38
- Label: 360 Records
- Producer: Donae'o, Dexplicit, Teddy (Silencer),

Lethal Bizzle chronology
Go Hard (2009)	Best of Bizzle (2011)

Singles from Best of Bizzle
- 1. "Pow 2011" Released: February 6, 2011

"Best of Bizzle" is a compilation album by grime MC, Lethal Bizzle. It was released on February 27, 2011, for digital download. The album features artists such as Mr Hudson, Donae'o, Dizzee Rascal, Tawiah, Kate Nash and Mark Ronson - along with Lethal Bizzle's fellow grime artists. The first single off the album, "Pow 2011", was released on February 6, 2011. The album consists of 27 songs.

== Background ==
Bizzle had revealed that he was working on an album titled Best of Bizzle. In an interview in early 2011, Bizzle said: "I'm working on my fourth album, which should be out in the summer. I'm also doing a Bizzle compilation, which is gonna be out in February, again just like tracks from the whole last ten years, like a little celebration thing for the fans, they can get that. It's called The Best Of Bizzle. So yeah, and I've got this album I'm working on. I'm trying to do a real, kinda like movie album. Like the Pow video - the second record is gonna be a continuation of the video and so forth. So there's gonna be another three singles that I'm gonna be dropping."

== Singles ==
The first single, Pow 2011, was released on February 6, 2011, for digital download and features JME, Wiley, Chipmunk, Face, P Money, Ghetts & Kano. It is a re-make of Bizzle's hit single Pow! (Forward). Bizzle revealed that he plans on releasing three more singles from the album - and the second single's video would continue from Pow 2011.

Previous singles that have already been released and are on the album are; "Uh Oh", "Fire", "Go Hard", "Mind Your Head", "Mr.", "Bizzle Bizzle", "Police on My Back" and "Go Go Go".

== Track listing ==
Adapted from Amazon.co.uk.

No.	Title	Writer(s)	Producer	Length
1.	"Pow 2011" (featuring JME, Wiley, Chipmunk, Face, P Money, Ghetts & Kano)	JME, Wiley, Chipmunk, Face, P Money, Ghetts & Kano	Teddy (Silencer)	3:43
2.	"Go Hard" (featuring Donae'o)		Donae'o	3:32
3.	"Lost My Mind" (featuring Tawiah and Mark Ronson)			3:15
4.	"Kickback"			3:00
5.	"Should Have Known"			3:19
6.	"Go Go Go!" (featuring Luciana)		Nick Bridges	2:43
7.	"Oi" (featuring More Fire Crew)			4:31
8.	"So Addictive" (featuring Donae'o)		Donae'o	3:20
9.	"Fire"			3:05
10.	"Look What You Done" (featuring Kate Nash)			3:23
11.	"Hitman"			2:06
12.	"The Come Up"			3:15
13.	"Police on My Back"		Akira The Don	3:19
14.	"Selfridges Girl Not on Myspace"			2:54
15.	"No" (featuring Fire Camp)			2:32
16.	"The Best"			2:46
17.	"Uh Oh"			2:55
18.	"Rockstar"			2:43
19.	"Crazy Nightmare"			2:51
20.	"Mind Your Head"			3:14
21.	"Mr." (featuring Face)		Dexplicit	2:28
22.	"Bizzle Bizzle"			2:30
23.	"My Eyes" (featuring Mr Hudson)			3:22
24.	"Still the Same" (featuring More Fire Crew & Dizzee Rascal)			4:23
25.	"Never Trust" (featuring More Fire Crew)			5:55
26.	"Haters" (featuring More Fire Crew)			5:16
27.	"Over Now" (featuring More Fire Crew)			3:18

== Charts ==
Chart (2011)	Peak position
UK R&B Chart	24

== Release history ==
Region	Date	Format
United Kingdom	February 27, 2011	Digital Download
United Kingdom	February 28, 2011	CD
