= Against All Odds =

Against All Odds may refer to:

== Film and television ==
=== Film ===
- Against All Odds (1924 film), a lost American silent Western film
- Against All Odds (1984 film), an American film starring Rachel Ward, Jeff Bridges and James Woods
- Against All Odds (2011 film), a Swiss documentary (German title: Mit dem Bauch durch die Wand)
- Against All Odds, American video title of a 1968 British crime film otherwise known as The Blood of Fu Manchu
- Against All Odds (2025 film), a Chinese war film (Chinese title: 营救飞虎)

=== Television ===
- Against All Odds (TV series), an American reality television series broadcast for four episodes on NBC in 1992
- Against All Odds (Philippine TV series), original title of My Guardian Alien, which debuted in 2024
- Against All Odds: Lost and Found, a British television film produced by BBC and aired in 1994
- "Against All Odds" (D:TNG episode), an episode from Degrassi: The Next Generation during the 2003–04 season
- Against All Odds, English title of the 2013 Filipino television series Huwag Ka Lang Mawawala

== Music ==
=== Albums ===
- Against All Odds (Conflict album), 1989
- Against All Odds (Curtis Lundy album), 1999
- Against All Odds (N-Dubz album), 2009
- Against All Odds (soundtrack), the soundtrack from the 1984 movie
- Against All Odds, a 2000 album by Take 5
- Against All Odds, a 2001 album by Tragedy Khadafi
- Against All Odds, a 2009 album by aKING
- Against All Odds, a 2020 EP by Onefour

=== Songs ===
- "Against All Odds (Take a Look at Me Now)", a song by Phil Collins, written for the 1984 film of that name
- "Against All Odds (Take a Look at Me Now)" (Mariah Carey recording), Mariah Carey's rendition of the song, also featuring Westlife, 2000
- "Against All Odds" (Chase & Status song), 2009
- "Against All Odds", a 1996 song by Tupac Shakur from The Don Killuminati: The 7 Day Theory album

== Other uses ==
- Against All Odds (biography), a 2017 book about Edgar Lungu by Anthony Mukwita
- Against All Odds (novel), a 2017 book by Danielle Steel
- Against All Odds (video game), a 2005 browser-based video game by UNHCR
- TNA Against All Odds - annual professional wrestling event
- Against All Odds: My Story, an autobiography by Chuck Norris

== See also ==
- Against All Oddz, a 2005 album by Lethal Bizzle
- Against the Odds (disambiguation)
