= Mind Spinning =

Single by Lethal Bizzle
- Released: 19 June 2011
- Genre: Grime, dubstep
- Length: 3:57
- Label: 360
- Songwriter(s): Maxwell Ansah, Paul Capillaire, Oscar Harding, Richard Hoey
- Producer(s): R1 Productions

Lethal Bizzle singles chronology
| "Pow 2011" (2011) | "Mind Spinning" (2011) | "Not a Saint" (2013) |

"Mind Spinning" is a single by UK independent grime artist Lethal Bizzle. It was released on 19 June 2011 for digital download. The track features chorus vocals by producer Shaun Barrett better known as Hypertone

== Music video ==
The music video was uploaded to YouTube on 19 April 2011. It was the sequel to "Pow 2011". The video features cameos from Donae'o, JME and Wiley. The video is continued from where Pow 2011's music video ended. After successfully looting the money Bizzle goes home, drops the money off and attends a party. Bizzle is wooed by a lady at the party who gets Bizzle drunk in an attempt to steal the money.

On his way home Bizzle almost has a car crash; simultaneously not remembering what happened to him at the party. Upon arriving at home he finds out that the money had been stolen and that he had been set up by the lady at the party, and was betrayed by his friend (played by Wiley) - later being arrested.

== Track listings ==
Digital download - EP

1. "Mind Spinning"
2. "Mind Spinning" (Radio Edit)
3. "Mind Spinning" (Clean)
4. "Mind Spinning" (D n A Big Room Mix Radio Edit)

== Chart performance ==
| Chart (2011) | Peak position |
|---|---|
| UK Singles (OCC) | 73 |
| UK Hip Hop/R&B (OCC) | 21 |
| UK Indie (OCC) | 10 |
