= Diztortion =

- Born: Raoul Lionel Chen; 2 November 1984 (age 41); Amsterdam, Netherlands
- Genres: Electronica; grime; hip hop; reggae fusion; trip hop
- Occupations: Producer; songwriter
- Years active: 2012–present
- Labels: 2-Tone Entertainment; Polydor; Universal

Raoul Lionel Chen (born 2 November 1984), better known as Diztortion, is a Dutch-born songwriter and record producer, best known for his work with the UK artists Stylo G, Lethal Bizzle, Tinie Tempah and Sigma.

His first notable release was "Soundbwoy" by the Anglo-Jamaican dancehall artist Stylo G. In May 2015, Diztortion had notable success with Lethal Bizzle on "Fester Skank". The song reached number 11 in the OCC UK Charts. The record was also used in the BT Sport advertisement for the UEFA Champions League.

== Early life ==
Diztortion was born in Amsterdam, Netherlands, and is of Surinamese background.

== Career ==
Having grown up in Amsterdam and spending years mastering his craft as a producer, rapper and singer, Diztortion moved to the UK in late 2012. He signed to 2-Tone Entertainment to further his career after his underground success in the Netherlands.

He began to bring a new sound which drew upon UK grime culture and took influences from his musical background of hip hop, electro house, R&B and reggae. After setting up his recording studio in London he began working with the likes of Stylo G, Lethal Bizzle, Major Lazer and Wiley.

In March 2013, Diztortion had his first top 20 hit with "Soundbwoy" by Stylo G. The track was A-listed on BBC Radio 1 and has over 1 million views on YouTube.

Lethal Bizzle then released the Diztortion produced "They Got It Wrong" which featured the English grime artist Wiley. Diztortion continued his success in 2013 with Lethal Bizzle's "Party Right", which reached 29 in the UK OCC Chart, and the club anthem "Badd" for Stylo G.

In 2014, Diztortion had more hits with Lethal Bizzle. "The Drop" reached number 20 in the OCC and "Rari Workout" reached 11 in the UK OCC Chart. In August, he signed a record deal with Polydor and Universal Records and also signed a publishing deal with Warner/Chappell. The first solo single was released in late 2014 and featured vocals by Ms. Dynamite.

In May 2015, Diztortion had another hit with Lethal Bizzle's "Fester Skank" which reached number 11 in the OCC UK charts. It was aused in the BT Sport advertisement for the UEFA Champions League.

Diztortion also produced the track "Peak" for Tinie Tempah in 2015, which featured the UK rappers Stormzy and Bugzy Malone.

Other notable releases in 2015 include "My Number 1" by Stylo G featuring Gyptian, a record Diztortion co-wrote with Stylo G, and the Lethal Bizzle featuring Shakka single "Playground", which was another Diztortion produced single.

On 24 August 2015, it was announced that Diztortion had collaborated with the drum and bass duo Sigma on a track called "Redemption" which featured vocals from Jacob Banks.

In July 2016, Diztortion posted images of himself in the studio with Rita Ora and the Norwegian production duo Stargate - they were rumoured to have been working on Ora's new album.

On 4 August 2016, Diztortion was seen in the studio working with the US singer Kelly Clarkson on her new album.

On 22 October, the Jamaican reggae artist Sean Paul confirmed that the track "Mad Love (Watch The Tempo)" would be a part of his forthcoming project being released by Island Records. He also confirmed the track would feature vocals from Shakira and was co-written/produced by Diztortion and songwriters David Guetta, Giorgio Tunifort, Ina Wroldsen and Emily Warren.

== Production and songwriting credits ==
2013
Stylo G – "Soundbwoy"
Lethal Bizzle featuring Wiley – "They Got It Wrong"
Lethal Bizzle featuring Ruby Goe – "Party Right"
Baby Blue – "Soapbox"
Bashy – "The World"
Stylo G – "Badd"
Lethal Bizzle – "Hammrd"

2014
Cashtastic – "Life on the Edge"
Cashtastic – "Panicking"
Lethal Bizzle featuring Cherri Voncelle – "The Drop"
Lethal Bizzle featuring JME and Tempa – T "Rari WorkOut"
Diztortion featuring Ms. Dynamite – "Bandalero"

2015
Cashtastic – "808"
Lethal Bizzle featuring Diztortion – "Fester Skank"
Tinie Tempah featuring Stormzy and Bugzy Malone – "Peak"
Diztortion featuring Sasha Keable and Stylo G – "Put Your Love On Me"
Lethal Bizzle featuring Shakka – "Playground"
Lethal Bizzle featuring Stormzy – "Dude"
Sigma and Diztortion featuring Jacob Banks – Redemption"
Stylo G feat. Gyptian – "My Number One"

2016
Lethal Bizzle – "Boxx"
Diztortion ft Bennie Man & Melissa Steel – "I'll Be There"
Lethal Bizzle – "Wobble"
Last Night In Paris – "Been A Minute"
Professor Green – "One Eye On The Door"
Taya – "Deeper"
Diztortion feat. Avelino – "On A Wave"

2020
KSI – "Swerve", featured on his album All over the Place

== Remix credits ==
- Baby Blue – "Bump"
- Charlie Brown – "Bones"
- Stoshee – "My Music Man"
- Tanya Lacey – "Now That You're Gone"
- Stylo G – "Move Back"
- New World Sound featuring Lethal Bizzle – "Flutes VIP"
- Sinead Harnett featuring Wiley – "Do It Any Way"
- DJ Fresh & High Contrast feat. Dizzee Rascal – "How Love Begins"
