= Against the Odds =

Against the Odds may refer to:

- "Against the Odds" (TV series), an early 1980s Nickelodeon show
- "Against the Odds" (song), a 2011 song by Danish singer Christopher
- Against the Odds (novel), from 2000, the seventh and last novel of Familias Regnant universe by Elizabeth Moon
- Against the Odds: Making a Difference in Global Health, a 2008 exhibition at the United States National Library of Medicine
- Against the Odds, the 1997 autobiography of British inventor and industrialist James Dyson co-written by Giles Coren

== See also ==
- Against All Odds (disambiguation)
