= All-star =

Group of people all having a high level of performance in their field

An all-star team is a group of people all having a high level of performance in their field. Originating in sports, it has since drifted into vernacular and has been borrowed heavily by the entertainment industry.

== Sports ==
Sports leagues often organize annual all-star games, an exhibition game aiming to pit top players against each other. Typically, the games are held between teams representing a league's conferences, divisions, or nationality (such as domestic players against international players), with the exact rosters determined by either the league, a public poll, or a "draft" process involving honorary captains.

== Entertainment ==
=== Cinema ===
The term "all star" is also used in films, often used as a form of publicity gimmick to promote the cast of a movie in which a number of high-profile actors appear, sometimes merely in cameo roles. An archetype is the 1956 version of Around the World in 80 Days.

=== Television ===
In a similar vein to sporting events, some reality television franchises (such as America's Got Talent, Dancing with the Stars, Survivor, and RuPaul's Drag Race) have held all-star seasons featuring notable contestants from previous seasons, such as champions, contestants popular among viewers, and notable contestants from international versions of the franchise. These can include entire seasons where the alumni compete against each other, or a spin-off competition with a different format. One such example—Survivor: Winners at War—marked the 40th season and 20th anniversary of the American version by featuring 20 winners from past seasons competing for an increased $2,000,000 prize, and incorporating challenges from seasons that its contestants had previously participated in. Survivor 50 similarly marked the 50th season and 25th anniversary by featuring both all-star contestants, as well as aspects and twists of the season being determined by online polls.

Another type of all-star format involves alumni from a domestic version competing against or among a team of alumni from international versions. Australian Ninja Warrior conducted a similar "State of Origin" special inspired by the State of Origin series in rugby league, consisting of five teams of alumni representing Australia's states.

Sometimes, all-star crossovers may be organized between contestants of multiple reality formats; the MTV series The Challenge was originally a competition spin-off of its reality shows The Real World and Road Rules, and has traditionally featured cast members from both. Later seasons began to also include alumni from other MTV reality franchises such as Are You the One?, Ex on the Beach, and Geordie Shore, and the show eventually expanded to incorporate alumni from non-MTV reality series as well.

=== Music ===
"All-stars" in music terms is referred to record labels or a music genre's top musical artists. An example of this includes the single "Pow 2011" by Lethal Bizzle in which all the featured artists are credited as "Grime All-Stars". Sometimes, labels organize such all-star sessions to release dedicated albums. Examples of this case are the collective This Mortal Coil under the 4AD label, or the Roadrunner United sessions by Roadrunner Records. The term is not equivalent to supergroup, which refers to a group made of already established musicians from other popular bands or with a successful solo career.

=== Comics ===
The All Star DC Comics was an imprint of ongoing American comic book titles published by DC Comics that ran from 2005 to 2008. DC has published two titles under the All-Star banner, featuring Batman and Superman. The premise of the imprint was to partner DC Comics' top tier characters with the most popular and acclaimed writers and artists.

== See also ==
- Ensemble cast
- Supergroup (music)
