= Against All Oddz =

Studio album by Lethal Bizzle
- Released: 15 August 2005
- Recorded: 2004–2005
- Genre: Grime
- Label: V2 Records
- Producer: Sticky, Charles Wilson, Dexplicit, Plasticman, Biggaman, Skillz, DJ Wonder, Kray Twinz

Lethal Bizzle chronology
Against All Oddz (2005)	Back to Bizznizz (2007)

Against All Oddz is the first solo album by grime artist Lethal Bizzle. It was released on 15 August 2005.

== Track listing ==
No.	Title	Producer(s)	Length
1.	"Intro"		0:55
2.	"Uh Oh! (I'm Back)"	Sticky	2:58
3.	"Kickback"	Sticky	3:00
4.	"Fire"	Charles Wilson	3:06
5.	"Do It" (featuring Fumin & Amina)	Dexplicit	3:14
6.	"Mind Your Head"	Dexplicit	3:16
7.	"Against All Oddz"	Plasticman	5:07
8.	"Slow" (featuring Kele Le Roc)	Sticky	5:15
9.	"Had To Go"	Biggaman	3:29
10.	"No!" (featuring Fire Camp)	Dexplicit	2:34
11.	"The Truth"	Dexplicit	3:06
12.	"The Best"	Skillz	2:48
13.	"Should Of Known"	DJ Wonder	3:21
14.	"Hitman"	Dexplicit	2:08
15.	"Til The Next Time"	Skillz	2:51
16.	"F**k You"	Skillz	2:12
17.	"What We Do" (with Kray Twinz, Gappy Ranks & Twista)	Kray Twinz	3:01
