= Pow 2011 =

2011 music single by Lethal Bizzle

Single by Lethal Bizzle featuring Jme, Wiley, Chipmunk, Face, P Money, Ghetts and Kano

from the album Best of Bizzle
- Released: 6 February 2011
- Recorded: 2010
- Genre: Grime
- Length: 3:43
- Label: 360 Records
- Songwriters: Maxwell Ansah; Jamie Adenuga; Richard Cowie Jr.; Jahmaal Fyffe; Face; Paris Moore-Williams; Justin Clark; Kane Robinson
- Producer: Teddy (Silencer)

Lethal Bizzle singles chronology
"Go Go Go!" (2010)	"Pow 2011" (2011)	"Mind Spinning" (2011)

Jme singles chronology
"CD Is Dead" (2010)	"Pow 2011" (2011)	"JME" (2011)

Chipmunk singles chronology
"Champion" (2011)	"Pow 2011" (2011)	"In the Air" (2011)

Wiley singles chronology
"Now or Never" (2011)	"Pow 2011" (2011)	"Numbers in Action" (2011)

Ghetts singles chronology
"Grime Daily" (2010)	"Pow 2011" (2011)	"Who's on the Panel" (2011)

Kano singles chronology
"Spaceship" (2010)	"Pow 2011" (2011)	"Worry About You" (2013)

P Money singles chronology
"Pow 2011" (2011)	"Anthemic" (2011)

"Pow 2011" (often capitalized as POW 2011 or POW! 2011) is a song by grime MC Lethal Bizzle, featuring fellow grime artists Jme, Wiley, Chipmunk, Face, P Money, Ghetts and Kano – who are usually credited as 'Grime All Stars'. The song is a sequel of Lethal Bizzle's hit single "Pow! (Forward)" which was released in 2004. "Pow 2011" was released as a single on 6 February 2011 for digital download and was produced by Teddy, also known as Silencer. It was the first single from Bizzle's compilation album, Best of Bizzle. Soccer AM used the song for the background music to a part of the show called "Frimponged".

== Background ==
The song was premiered by Tim Westwood on 18 November 2010. Each artist who is on the song wrote their own verse. The re-make is produced by Teddy, also known as Silencer – whose trademark is heard at the beginning of the song. He stated that he decided to re-make the original Pow beat, and make it "Teddy-style".

It was announced by Lethal Bizzle on Twitter that he would be re-releasing "Pow!" on 13 December 2010, to try to get the Christmas number 1 in the UK Singles Chart, like many people were trying to do by using Facebook campaigns. On 18 November 2010, Lethal was interviewed by Grime Daily. Bizzle revealed: "The whole Pow 2011 thing started as a joke. I was on Twitter one day and I said 'You know what? Pow for Christmas number 1'. And bare people retweeted it and someone was like 'Bizz you should do an updated version to go with it.'" Lethal (saying to another source) said: "I felt the original was still relevant, 6 years on it's still one of the biggest club tunes, so it was kind of a no brainer. I was messing around on Twitter about doing a new POW and getting it to the top of the charts- and the reaction was so crazy I thought wow I actually have to make this happen..."

Lethal then discussed how the collaborations came together, saying that he was not serious about recreating Pow at first: "Wiley phoned me from Australia or Jamaica, he was in another country somewhere – and he was goin' "bruv, what's this about you doing another Pow? I wanna be on it!" When I said I was joking he was like "No! Biz, you have to do it." Then some 1Xtra DJ called me and said "bruv, you need to do that!" I was just like "are you bein' serious?" Then I thought alright, I'll phone a few people, see who's on it. So I phoned Jme, he's like "yup, I'm on it, 1000%", I phoned Chipmunk, he's like "yup, I'm on it, 1000%". I was just like rah, people really want this!"

Lethal said that there were other people who he asked to do a verse but were taking too long. Other Grime artists, Sway and Maxsta were originally supposed to be on the final version. Bizzle was also going to ask Tempa T (also known as Tempz) to do a verse but was touring with Chase & Status. Rumours went around that Chipmunk told Bizzle to not put Maxsta on but Bizzle declined those rumours. Kano, another Grime artist that is featured on Pow 2011, recorded a 16-bar rap – when originally everyone was expected to do an 8-bar. Sway recorded his verse but decided that he was not going to be on the song because of Kano's verse being a 16-bar. Sway did, however, record his own version containing 72-bars, named Wow 2011, which he uploaded on his YouTube channel. Kano also released an extended solo version of his verse for free download via SoundCloud, which he dubbed the 'Dench Edition'.

== Music video ==
The music video was uploaded to YouTube on 24 December 2010 and is directed by Carly Cussen, who has directed other music videos for 360 Records since the age of 17 (notably Tinie Tempah's early debut, "Wifey"). The storyline focuses on all the artists (except for Wiley, who is not in the video, however a picture of him is shown during his verse) successfully robbing a vault full of money. The police split up and chase after each of them. In the behind-the-scenes video, Bizzle described the storyline briefly; "We're trying to make some money with this big plot while breaking in the vault. Everyone's got their own role to play in terms of trying to get the 10 million pounds."

Lethal Bizzle plays the look-out, Jme being the distraction (who is captured and interrogated, then escapes), Chipmunk and Face collect the money and P Money plays the getaway driver. Two vans are shown – one with the money and one without (in order to fool the police). Ghetts drives the distraction van during his verse, who is then cornered. The policemen open the back of the van showing a goat. The van with the money, which is being driven by P Money, stops at a warehouse where Kano is shown hiding the bags of money. The rest of them arrive, take the bags, put them in the van and drive off – with some parts showing the van with the goat, along with the confused policemen. During Wiley's verse, Jme is shown being further interrogated and all the artists together outside the vault. Other scenes include Bizzle rapping alone outside the vault and at some points all of the artists together as shown during Wiley's verse.

While talking about the video and Carly Cussen, Bizzle said: "..;it was all her idea. Amazing, it was so funny – when we had the meeting, and she was like "OK I've got this idea" I'm sat there like cool. She says "basically there's gonna be police; police chases, we're gonna rob a bank, we're gonna be on top of a roof..." I was like is this girl being serious? Then she done a script and got all the locations and somehow we did it man! Incredible and yeah, me and her are working together to do the whole sequel thing, so look out for that!"

== Track listing ==
- Digital download
1. "POW 2011" (Radio Edit) – 3:00 *
2. "POW 2011" (Big Beats Productions Remix) (Radio Edit) – 3:23 *
3. "POW 2011" (Original Edit) – 3:43
4. "POW 2011" (Original Edit Instrumental) – 3:43 *
5. "POW 2011" (Big Beats Productions Remix) – 4:30
6. "POW 2011" (Original Edit) – 3:43 *
7. "POW 2011" (Accapella Original Edit) – 3:29 *
8. "POW 2011" (Big Beats Productions Remix) – 4:30 *
9. "POW 2011" (Skream Murky Mix) – 3:41 *

Notes;

- * – explicit version.

== Chart performance ==
Chart (2011)	Peak position
UK Singles (OCC)	33
UK Hip Hop/R&B (OCC)	10
UK Indie (OCC)	4
