= Not a Saint =

Single by Vato Gonzalez vs. Lethal Bizzle & Donae'o
- Released: 6 January 2013
- Recorded: 2012
- Length: 2:30 (radio edit)
- Label: New State Music
- Songwriter(s): Maxwell Ansah, Ian Greenidge
- Producer(s): Vato Gonzalez

Vato Gonzalez singles chronology
"Badman Riddim (Jump)" (2011)	"Not a Saint" (2013)	"Sushi Riddim" (2013)

Lethal Bizzle singles chronology
"Leave It Yeah" (2012)	"Not a Saint" (2013)	"They Got It Wrong" (2013)

Donae'o singles chronology
"You Should Know" (2012)	"Not a Saint" (2013)	"Mami No Like" (2016)

"Not a Saint" is a song by Dutch DJ & producer Vato Gonzalez featuring vocals from Lethal Bizzle and Donae'o. It was released on January 6, 2013 as a digital download in the United Kingdom. The song is a remix of Lethal Bizzle's single of the same name featuring Donae'o. The remix received positive feedback from the public and was subsequently released as a collaborative single. It has peaked at number 20 on the UK Singles Chart.

== Music video ==
A music video to accompany the release of "Not a Saint" was first released onto YouTube on November 22, 2012 at a total length of two minutes and thirty-two seconds.

== Track listing ==
Digital download
No.	Title	Length
1.	"Not a Saint" (Radio Edit)	2:30
2.	"Not a Saint" (Extended Mix)	6:05
3.	"Not a Saint" (Andi Durrant Remix)	6:04
4.	"Not a Saint" (Jaxxon Remix)	5:49
5.	"Not a Saint" (Max NRG Drumstep Remix)	4:10
6.	"Not a Saint" (Max NRG Remix)	4:10
7.	"Not a Saint" (Substantial Error Remix)	4:27
8.	"Not a Saint" (Skitzofrenix Remix)	3:44

== Chart performance ==
Chart (2013)	Peak position
Belgium (Ultratip Bubbling Under Flanders)	68
Scotland (OCC)	22
UK Singles (OCC)	20
UK Indie (OCC)	1

== Release history ==
Region	Date	Format	Label
United Kingdom	January 6, 2013	Digital download	New State Music
