= Come Over (Clean Bandit song) =

Single by Clean Bandit featuring Stylo G

from the album New Eyes
- Released: 8 August 2014
- Recorded: March 2014
- Genre: Electronic; dancehall; reggae
- Length: 3:43
- Label: Warner; Big Beat; Atlantic
- Songwriters: Jack Patterson; Jason Andre McDermott; Grace Chatto; James Napier
- Producer: Clean Bandit

Clean Bandit singles chronology
| "Extraordinary" (2014) | "Come Over" (2014) | "Real Love" (2014) |

Stylo G singles chronology
| "Move Back" (2014) | "Come Over" (2014) | "We Make It Bounce" (2014) |

Music video
- "Come Over" on YouTube

"Come Over" is a song by British electronic group Clean Bandit. It features British reggae artist Stylo G. Its first release was on 8 August 2014 in Ireland. The song features auto-tuned vocals from band member Grace Chatto.

== Background ==
In an interview with the Official Charts Company, Clean Bandit violinist Neil Amin-Smith said that the group had the idea of working with a Jamaican vocalist since 2012, when they were in talks with other producers. "Come Over" itself came about after the instrumental had been created and the opportunity to do something with Stylo G came about, and it slotted into place. Cellist and vocalist Grace Chatto described Stylo G as "an incredible force of energy".

== Critical reception ==
The Guardian said that the song "pitche[d] a cut-glass female voice against the dancehall vocals of Stylo G: it would be an interesting juxtaposition, were it not for the fact that they're both engaged in singing a song that seems to be going out of its way to drive you up the wall".

== Music video ==
The music video that was shot for the single was directed and co-filmed by Clean Bandit bassist Jack Patterson, whom Amin-Smith referred to as "the brains behind... the video. He spent a year at film school. For most people that probably wouldn't have been enough to start making incredible music videos but he's a bit of a geek. Geek and/or genius! He's just kind of self-taught since then. Now the operation has become bigger, he's more of a director". For it, Stylo G took extra riding lessons especially for the video. The video was shot in Marrakesh and Svalbard, the reason being - according to Chatto - "we wanted the contrast for the video of switching between the warm and cold climates". Filming the video was complicated as they had to fit it within a hectic few weeks, starting with getting off a UK festival and straight on to a flight. On the day they were supposed to travel to Svalbard, the temperature got to the aeroplane and they struggled to land. Two attempts were made before the pilot decided to turn back. The video has gained comparisons to Game of Thrones, though Amin-Smith has said this was not intended. Chatto wears furs in the Svalbard parts of the video and thus resembles the Game of Thrones character Daenerys Targaryen.

== Track listing ==
Digital download – single
| No. | Title | Length |
|---|---|---|
| 1. | "Come Over" (featuring Stylo G) | 3:43 |

Digital download – EP
| No. | Title | Length |
|---|---|---|
| 1. | "Come Over" (featuring Stylo G and Ce'cile) (Toddla T Sound Reversion) | 3:15 |
| 2. | "Come Over" (Melé 'Quadrants' Remix) | 4:45 |
| 3. | "Come Over" (Todd Terry Remix) | 3:26 |
| 4. | "Come Over" (Cahill Remix) | 3:02 |

== Charts ==
| Chart (2014) | Peak position |
|---|---|
| Belgium (Ultratip Bubbling Under Flanders) | 7 |
| Belgium (Ultratip Bubbling Under Wallonia) | 17 |
| Germany (GfK) | 76 |
| Hungary (Stream Top 40) | 37 |
| Poland Dance (ZPAV) | 18 |
| UK Dance (Official Charts) | 12 |
| UK Singles (Official Charts) | 45 |

== Release history ==
| Region | Date | Format | Label |
|---|---|---|---|
| United Kingdom | 10 August 2014 | Digital download | Warner Music Group |
