= Stylo G =

British-Jamaican reggae fusion recording artist

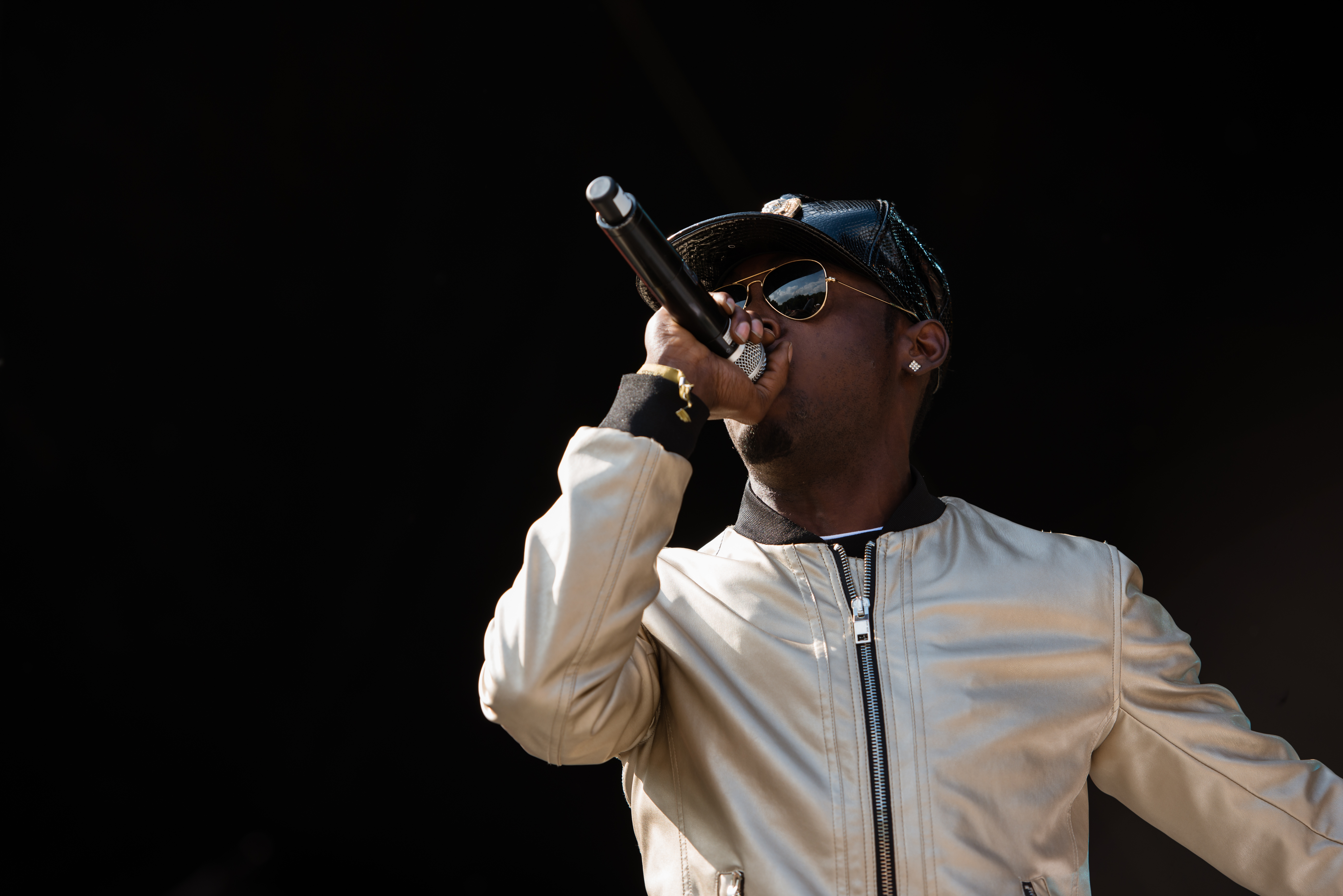
- Stylo G at Ruhr Reggae Summer 2014

Background information
- Born: Jason Andre McDermott; 16 July 1985 (age 41); Spanish Town, Jamaica
- Origin: South London, England
- Genres: Dancehall; hip hop; grime; electronica
- Occupations: Singer; songwriter; rapper
- Instrument: Vocals
- Years active: 2008–present
- Label: 3Beat

Jason Andre McDermott (born 16 July 1985 in Spanish Town, Jamaica), better known by his stage name Stylo G, is a British-Jamaican rapper, record producer, songwriter and singer known for his three hit singles "My Yout", "Call Mi a Leader" and "Soundbwoy". "Soundbwoy" peaked at number 18 on the UK Singles Chart. He also featured on the hit song "Come Over" by the British electronic group Clean Bandit. He also got famous for his collaboration with Divine for the song "Mirchi".

== Biography ==
McDermott's family relocated to London at the age of fifteen, following the murder of his father, artist and producer Poison Chang. He currently resides in South London.

== History ==
Stylo G's first initial hit was a grime song, "My Yout", featuring Stickman and Ice Kid. The song gained some notability within the grime scene. As a result of being in the UK, he collaborated with many UK rap and grime artists such as Giggs, Chip, Zeph Ellis, and Wretch 32.

In 2011, Stylo G released "Call Mi A Yardie".

In 2012, Stylo G featured in the Red Bull Culture Clash alongside Rita Ora and Usher.

On 26 May 2013, he released the single "Soundbwoy", his first UK Top 20 single. The song also reached number 29 in Scotland. In 2014, he appeared on the Clean Bandit song "Come Over" which peaked at number 45 on the UK Singles Chart. In September 2014, he was nominated for a MOBO Award in the Best Reggae Act category.

In 2019, police raided an Airbnb residence Stylo G was staying at in Caymanas Estate, St Catherine in Jamaica. The police surrounded the house and showed a warrant, explaining they were looking for guns. After a five-hour search, they found nothing.

== Discography ==
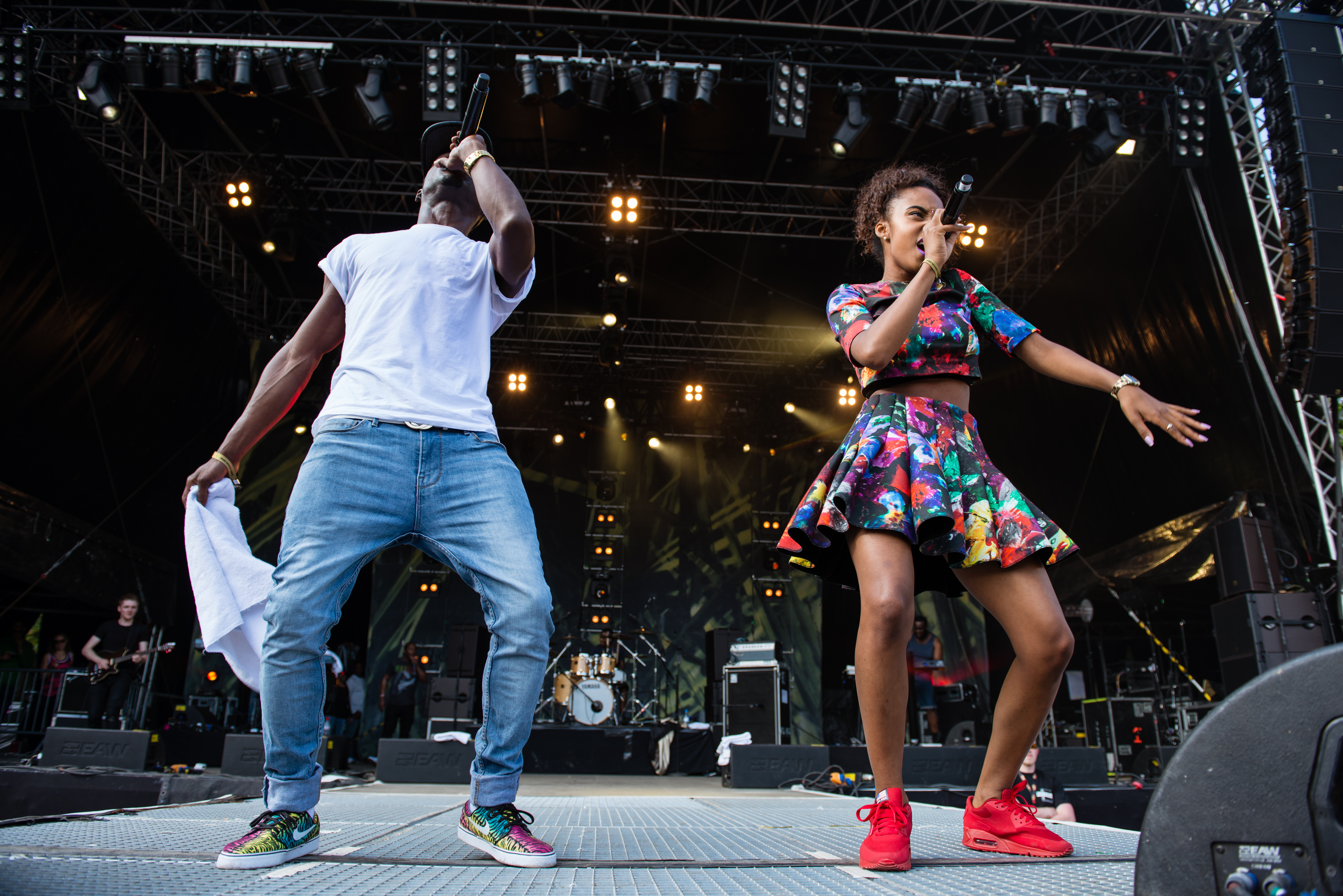
Stylo G at Ruhr Reggae Summer 2014

=== Singles ===
Title	Year	Peak chart positions		Album
Title	Year	UK	SCO	Album
"Summer Is Back"	2012	—	—	Non-album single
"Press Up"	2012	—	—	Non-album single
"Mama (Give Me a Call)"	2013	—	—	Non-album single
"Soundbwoy"	2013	18	29	Non-album single
"Badd" (with Sister Nancy)	2013	—	—	Non-album single
"Move Back"	2014	81	—	Non-album single
"Call Mi a Leader"	2014	157	—	Non-album single
"My Number 1 (Love Me, Love Me, Love Me)" (featuring Gyptian)	2015	45	—	Non-album single
"My Time"	2016	—	—	Non-album single
"Boomin' Ball"	2016	—	—	Non-album single
"Bike Engine" (with Jacob Plant)	2016	—	—	Non-album single
"Mek Yeh Cum"	2017	—	—	Non-album single
"Boom"	2017	—	—	Non-album single
"Yu Zimme (Remix)" (with Chip)	2017	—	—	Non-album single
"Yu Zimme (All Star VIP)" (feat. Lisa Mercedez & Ms Banks)	2017	—	—	Non-album single
"Touch Down" (feat. Nicki Minaj & Vybz Kartel	2018	—	—	Non-album single
"Oh Lawd"	2020	—	—	Non-album single
"Dirty Dance" (with Banx & Ranx)	2023	—	—	Non-album single
"—" denotes single that did not chart or was not released.

=== As featured artist ===
Title	Year	Peak chart positions			Album
Title	Year	UK	BEL (FL)	GER	Album
"Blackberry" (Stamma Kid featuring Stylo G and Warning Crew)	2011	—	—	—	Nah Stop
"Talk" (Jodie Connor featuring Stylo G)	2012	—	—	—	Non-album single
"Tun Up" (Jus Now featuring Bunji Garlin and Stylo G)	2014	—	—	—	Non-album single
"Come Over" (Clean Bandit featuring Stylo G)	2014	45	— (Note: "Come Over" did not enter the Ultratop 50, but peaked at number 7 on the Flemish Ultratip chart.)	76	New Eyes
"Shizam" (Zed Bias featuring Stylo G and Scrufizzer)	2014	—	—	—	Non-album single
"Put Your Love On Me" (Diztortion featuring Sasha Keable and Stylo G)	2015	—	—	—	Non-album single
"Foundation" (Cadenza featuring Stylo G and Busy Signal)	2015	—	—	—	Non-album single
"Do It Like" (Lucas DiPasquale featuring Stylo G, Kardinal Offishall and Konshens)	2015	—	—	—	Post-Secondary EP
"Bring It Back" (Friction featuring Stylo G)	2016	—	—	—	Non-album single
"Chariot" (Will Simms featuring Stylo G)	2016	—	—	—	Non-album single
"Lingua" (Sub Focus featuring Stylo G)	2017	—	—	—	TBA
"Young Hearts" (Henry Fong featuring Nyla and Stylo G)	2017	—	—	—	Non-album single
"Won't Forget You" (Pixie Lott featuring Stylo G)	2017	—	—	—	TBA
"What A Night" (Lisa Mercedez featuring Stylo G)	2017	—	—	—	BGC Mixtape
"Contigo" (Mala Rodríguez featuring Stylo G)	2018	—	—	—	Non-album single
"Mirchi" (Divine (rapper) featuring MC Altaf, Stylo G, Phenom)	2020	—	—	—	Punya Paap

=== Guest appearances ===
List of non-single guest appearances, with other performing artists, showing year released and album name
Title	Year	Other artist(s)	Album
"More Liquor"	2012	Stamma Kid, Warning Crew	Nah Stop
"In The Party"	2014	Cashtastic, Fekky	Alarm Clock
"Check"	2014	Dru Blu	Double or Nothing
"We Make It Bounce”	2014	Dillon Francis, Major Lazer	Money Sucks, Friends Rule
"Storm Brew”	2016	TC	Unleash The Wolves
"La La La La (Means I Love You)”	2017	HRVY	Holiday EP
"Mel Made Me Do It”	2022	Stormzy	Non-album single
