= Pow! (Forward) =

2004 single by Lethal Bizzle

Single by Lethal Bizzle featuring Fumin, D Double E, Napper, Jamakabi, Neeko, Flowdan, Ozzie B, Forcer, Demon and Hotshot
- Released: 25 October 2004 (iTunes); 20 December 2004 (single)
- Recorded: February 2004; Commander B's Studio, Walthamstow, London
- Genre: Grime
- Length: 3:01; 3:52 (music video)
- Label: Lethal Bizzle Records; Relentless Records
- Songwriters: Maxwell Ansah; Darren Dixon; Elliot Amoakhoh; John Barrett; Osmond Bowes; Jermaine Coombs; Dean Harriott; Casim Scott; Tony Skerritt; Nicholas Thomas; Mark Veira
- Producer: Dexplicit

Lethal Bizzle singles chronology
"Pow! (Forward)" (2004)	"Uh Oh (I'm Here)" (2005)

"Pow! (Forward)" is the debut commercial solo single by English grime artist Lethal Bizzle. The track features guest appearances from a variety of underground grime artists from East London. It was released on 25 October 2004 for digital download via iTunes and then released more widely on 20 December 2004. It charted on 26 December 2004 at number 11 on the UK Singles Chart and currently stands as Bizzle's joint highest-charting solo single, along with "Rari WorkOut" and "Fester Skank". It won a MOBO Award for Best Single.

== Background ==
"Pow! (Forward)" was recorded in February 2004, shortly after Lethal Bizzle's first group More Fire Crew were dropped by their label Go! Beat. Their debut album, More Fire CV, had failed to chart, and Bizzle partially attributed the album's lack of success to its release during a time when the industry had reacted negatively to violent incidents in the UK garage scene, with major platforms such as BBC Radio 1 and MTV Base effectively boycotting garage and grime music. As a self-confessed publicity stunt, Bizzle had also participated in an exchange of diss tracks with Wiley at this time. He changed his stage name from Lethal B to Lethal Bizzle around the time of the song's release, and had also just established Fire Camp, a new supergroup combining members of More Fire, Lethal Bizzle Records, Fire Youngers and Boundary Crew. He has claimed that he expected to be re-approached by record labels following Dizzee Rascal's September 2003 Mercury Prize win but was not, and instead decided to set up Lethal Bizzle Records, announcing its launch in February 2004.

"Pow!" features guest appearances from ten other grime artists including fellow Fire Camp members Neeko, Ozzie B and Fumin, Napper and Demon of East Connection, Flowdan of Roll Deep and former member Jamakabi, and D Double E, who had recently left N.A.S.T.Y Crew; four of the most well-known East London grime crews in 2004. Bizzle hoped that by including members of multiple crews, their DJs – who would often have their own radio shows – would be able to boost the song's airplay. He asked each artist to rap some of their most popular lyrics on the song, with the aim of earning rewinds when it was played in raves and on radio; hence the song's original title "Forward", a term used in Jamaican dancehall music to refer to a 'reload'. D Double E was the only artist to insist on writing a new verse for the song instead of using an existing one. Bizzle had not intended to feature Jamakabi but he earned his place on the song after showing up to the recording session alongside Flowdan.

Commander B, who recorded the song at his studio in Walthamstow, premiered it on his weekly Choice FM show without Bizzle's permission prior to its release. Bizzle has recalled waking up and discovering that he had received many text messages overnight enquiring about the song. The single campaign was initially self-funded, and when director Mo Ali approached Bizzle expressing an interest in filming the music video, he was taken up on this offer. The video was picked up by Channel U, which has been credited by commentators as a factor in its success in spreading beyond regional pirate radio. After garnering interest from Relentless Records/Virgin, Ministry of Sound and Def Jam, it was subsequently signed to Relentless in August by A&R executive Glyn Aikins, who had previously overseen So Solid Crew's chart-topping single campaign for "21 Seconds" in 2001 and would later go on to become co-president of RCA UK. A second video was commissioned by the label, with a bigger budget for styling the artists. Relentless organised the song's release to coincide with the race for Christmas number one in the United Kingdom, ultimately achieving number eleven on the UK Singles Chart.

== Composition ==
The song is in an 'eight-bar rally' format, whereby each artist takes turns to rap a short eight-bar verse with no breaks and no chorus, with the exception of Hotshot, whose verse on the vinyl version of the song is sixteen bars long. The song alternates between two eight-bar loops. Producer Dexplicit, who was affiliated with the production crew Beat Camp at the time, created the instrumental in under an hour in the home of his fellow crew member Skilz, using FL Studio on a PC set up on the floor. He claims to have been among the first to sample American hip-hop and 808 drums in grime instead of leaning on UK garage influences. He gave Bizzle a CD of beats to choose from and Bizzle directed him to make some minor changes to the arrangement for the final version of the song. The beat was initially met with scepticism by several of the featured artists when they first heard it at the recording session.

== Controversy ==
The song's lyrics were thought to have inspired violence in nightclubs, resulting in some venues and radio stations in London and South East England imposing bans on Bizzle's entire discography, including instrumental versions of his songs. Bizzle capitalised on this, printing T-shirts with the phrase "Do not play Lethal Bizzle" in response. Culture journalists have suggested a correlation between public perceptions of "Pow!" and the introduction of Metropolitan Police risk assessment form 696 in 2008, which critics claim discriminated against Black musicians and stifled Black nightlife in the 2000s and 2010s.

== Legacy ==
"Pow! (Forward)" won the MOBO Award for Best Single in 2005. A documentary called Pow Pow about the song was released the same year. American rapper Jay-Z performed his verse of "Is That Your Chick" over the "Pow!" instrumental at multiple British tour dates in late 2006, including shows at the Wembley Arena and Royal Albert Hall with a live orchestra. His team enquired about recording an official remix of the song which was ultimately never released.

Wiley interpolated "Pow! (Forward)" in a diss track on the 2004 Roll Deep mixtape Creeper Vol. 2, a song in which Riko Dan also called into question Flowdan's involvement in "Pow!" during a time in which his crew were exchanging diss tracks with Lethal Bizzle.

Neeko, who features on the song, has since revealed that a misunderstanding over the song's lyrics led to a rift between him and Bizzle which precipitated the disbandment of More Fire Crew. Young Spray had incorrectly interpreted Forcer's line on the song "spray this swag MC right away" as an insult towards him, and Neeko passed on Bizzle's phone number to Spray without his permission. He was subsequently excluded from live performances of "Pow!" and it would be more than a decade before they performed together again, with More Fire Crew reuniting for a 2017 medley at the Roundhouse to celebrate Bizzle's acceptance of the Legacy Award at the GRM Daily Rated Awards. Neeko's own verse on "Pow!", which he opens with the lyric "killer, killer, real, real" in reference to his nickname Neeko Killer, offended Brixton grime artist Killa P, leading the pair to clash on the first Risky Roadz DVD, released in October 2004.

"Pow! (Forward)" eventually went on to become what music journalist Dan Hancox described in a Guardian article as the "unofficial soundtrack" to the 2010 student protests against a rise in tuition fees. Bizzle has since speculated that protesters were "relating to the unapologetic energy" of the song; they may have also been inspired by prominent spats between Bizzle and then-Prime Minister David Cameron, who had publicly challenged a 2007 Guardian op-ed from Bizzle in which he derogatorily called Cameron a "donut" and denounced claims that his music was inciting violence. In his 2018 book Inner City Pressure, Hancox details the events of the 9 December 2010 protest, during which the kettling of demonstrators by police evolved into a "spontaneous rave going on in Parliament Square", where "Pow!" was played alongside Jme's "Serious" and Tempa T's "Next Hype", getting the "most raucous reaction of all" as protesters passed around an AUX cord. It was played again a few hours later outside the Supreme Court, after the tuition fee bill had passed in parliament.

To celebrate the song's 20th anniversary, Bizzle played a headline London show at HERE at Outernet (originally set for the Roundhouse), in which he intended to bring together every artist on the song to perform it live together for the first time. Fumin and Demon did not appear at the event but the other nine artists on the song did, and were joined on the night by special guests including Roll Deep, Giggs and Jme.

== Sequels ==
=== "Pow! (Forward) [Da Bizzle Remix]" ===
Featured on the flip side of the single's 12" vinyl release was "Da Bizzle Remix", which featured almost all of the artists from the original song remixing their lyrics. Notably absent were D Double E, who was replaced with Fire Camp member Face on the remix, and Hotshot, who did not appear on the single version of the song.

=== "Forward Riddim 2" ===
"Forward Riddim 2", recorded shortly after "Pow! (Forward)", features eleven different guest MCs on the original instrumental, including other members of East Connection and N.A.S.T.Y. Crew as well as select artists from outside of East London. The song includes verses from Bruza, Flirta D, Scampz, Shizzle, Ryder, Jme, Ghetts, Kano, Knowledge, Lady Fury and Double O. It was leaked from the recording studio around early 2005 while Bizzle was promoting the Fire Camp single "No", which led Bizzle to claim he was "not really pushing it" and "now it is out there, the hype and surprise element is gone".

=== "Forward 2" ===
Lethal Bizzle's second crew, Fire Camp, released an unrelated song titled "Forward 2" in 2006, featuring fellow members such as Face, Ozzie B, and Knowledge set to a new Dexplicit production.

=== "Pow 2011" ===
In late 2010, Lethal Bizzle created an official sequel single to "Pow! (Forward)", which again features other grime MCs - Jme, Wiley, Chipmunk, Face, P Money, Ghetts and Kano. It was released on 6 February 2011 for digital download. Bizzle revealed that he was joking about doing a sequel to "Pow" at first, but then many fans on Twitter and artists such as Wiley, Chipmunk and Jme agreed with doing a sequel.

== Track listing ==
- CD RELDX15
1. "Pow! (Forward)" (Original) – 3:01
2. "Pow! (Forward)" (Da Bizzle Remix) – 2:49
3. "Pow! (Forward)" (D Hector Movie Mix) – 4:02
4. "Pow! (Forward)" (Relentless Video) – 3:42
5. "Pow! (Forward)" (Original Video) – 3:45
- 12" RELT 15

A1. "Pow! (Forward)" (Pow Edit) – 3:00
A2. "Pow! (Forward)" (Original) – 3:01
A3. "Pow! (Forward)" (Original Instrumental) – 3:29
B1. "Pow! (Forward)" (Da Bizzle Remix) – 2:49
B2. "Pow! (Forward)" (D Hector Movie Mix) – 4:02

- 12" RELTX 15

A1. "Pow! (Forward)" (Pow Edit) – 3:00
A2. "Pow! (Forward)" (Original) – 3:01
B1. "Pow! (Forward)" (Original Instrumental) – 3:29
B2. "Pow! (Forward)" (Da Bizzle Remix) – 2:49

- 12" RELTDJ 15

A. "Pow! (Forward)" (Original)
B1. "Pow! (Forward)" (D Hector Movie Mix)
B2. "Pow! (Forward)" (Original Instrumental)

== Chart performance ==
The song first charted on the UK Singles Chart on 1 January 2005 at number 11, being Lethal Bizzle's highest-charting single to date. The following week it dropped to number 14, then number 23. The week after, on 22 January 2005, it slipped to 37, and by 29 January 2005 it came just out of the top 40 at 41 and then remained in the top 100 for another two weeks - achieving a total of seven weeks on the UK Singles Chart. The record would be matched nine years later when his single "Rari WorkOut" also peaked at number 11, but the record would be broken if streaming had not been incorporated into the charts as "Rari WorkOut" peaked at number 8 on sales alone.

== Charts ==
Chart (2005)	Peak position
UK Singles (Official Charts)	11
UK Dance (Official Charts Company)	1
