= Flute (song) =

2013 single by New World Sound and Thomas Newson

Single by New World Sound & Thomas Newson
- Released: 25 November 2013; 11 April 2014 (Remixes)
- Recorded: 2013
- Genre: Big room house
- Length: 2:59
- Label: Doorn Records; Spinnin Records; Ministry of Sound Australia
- Songwriters: Tyrone James Taylor; Jesse Taylor; Tommy Verkuijlen
- Producers: New World Sound; Thomas Newson

New World Sound singles chronology
"Aye" (2013)	"Flute" (2013)	"Shakedown" (2014)

Thomas Newson singles chronology
"Neutron" (2013)	"Flute" (2013)	"Pallaroid" (2013)

"Flute" is a song by Australian electronic DJ and record production duo New World Sound and Dutch DJ and Record producer Thomas Newson. The song was released in Australia as a digital download in November 25, 2013 through Doorn Records, Spinnin Records and Ministry of Sound Australia. The song was written and produced by New World Sound and Thomas Newson. The song charted in Belgium, France, Netherlands and Switzerland. The cover art features a photograph by Russian photographer Vladimir Zotov of a young boy playing a flute to a cat.

== Music video ==
A music video to accompany the release of "Flute" was first released onto YouTube on November 21, 2013 at a total length of three minutes and twenty-nine seconds.

== Track listing ==
Digital download (Single)
No.	Title	Length
1.	"Flute"	2:59

Digital download (Remixes)
No.	Title	Length
1.	"Flute" (Uberjak'd Remix)	4:46
2.	"Flute" (Mightyfools Remix)	4:23
3.	"Flute" (Tony Junior and Bryan Mescal Remix)	3:57
4.	"Flute" (Tomsize and Simeon Festival Trap Remix)	3:21

== Chart performance ==
=== Weekly charts ===
Chart (2013–2014)	Peak position
Belgium (Ultratop 50 Flanders)	13
Belgium (Ultratop 50 Wallonia)	3
France (SNEP)	10
Hungary (Dance Top 40)	9
Hungary (Single Top 40)	9
Netherlands (Dutch Top 40)	29
Netherlands (Single Top 100)	55
Switzerland (Schweizer Hitparade)	59

=== Year-end charts ===
Chart (2014)	Position
Belgium (Ultratop Wallonia)	26
France (SNEP)	84
Hungary (Dance Top 40)	14
Hungary (Single Top 40)	87

== Release history ==
Region	Date	Format	Label
Australia	November 25, 2013	Digital download	Doorn Records; Spinnin Records; Ministry of Sound Australia
Australia	April 11, 2014	Digital download	Doorn Records; Spinnin Records; Ministry of Sound Australia

== Flutes ==
"Flutes"

Single by New World Sound & Thomas Newson featuring Lethal Bizzle
- Released: 21 December 2014
- Recorded: 2014
- Genre: Dance
- Length: 2:52
- Label: 3 Beat Records; Doorn Records; Spinnin Records
- Songwriters: Tyrone James Taylor; Jesse Taylor; Tommy Verkuijlen

New World Sound singles chronology
"How to Twerk" (2014)	"Flutes" (2014)

Thomas Newson singles chronology
"Bells At Midnight" (2014)	"Flutes" (2014)	"Wave Your Hands" (2015)

Lethal Bizzle singles chronology
"Rari WorkOut" (2014)	"Flutes" (2014)	"Fester Skank" (2015)

New World Sound and Thomas Newson released a second version of the song titled "Flutes" featuring guest vocals from British Grime artist Lethal Bizzle. It was released as a digital download on December 21, 2014.

=== Music video ===
A music video to accompany the release of "Flutes" was first released onto YouTube on September 30, 2014 at a total length of three minutes.

=== Track listing ===
Digital download (Single)
No.	Title	Length
1.	"Flutes" (featuring Lethal Bizzle)	2:52

Digital download (Remixes)
No.	Title	Length
1.	"Flutes" (featuring Lethal Bizzle, Tinchy Stryder and Lady Lykez) (VIP Diztortion Remix)	2:57
2.	"Flutes" (featuring Lethal Bizzle and Kerwin Prescott) (Just Now Dub Mix)	3:32
3.	"Flutes" (featuring Lethal Bizzle) (Danny Howard Dub Remix)	5:09
4.	"Flutes" (featuring Lethal Bizzle) (APEXX Remix)	4:35
5.	"Flutes" (featuring Lethal Bizzle) (Danglo Remix)	3:56
6.	"Flutes" (featuring Lethal Bizzle) (Stereotype Remix)	3:11
7.	"Flute"	4:47

=== Weekly charts ===
Chart (2014)	Peak position
UK Dance (Official Charts)	13
UK Singles (Official Charts)	67

=== Release history ===
Region	Date	Format	Label
United Kingdom	December 21, 2014	Digital download	3 Beat Records; Doorn Records; Spinnin Records
