= Marco V =

Dutch electronic music DJ (born 1967)

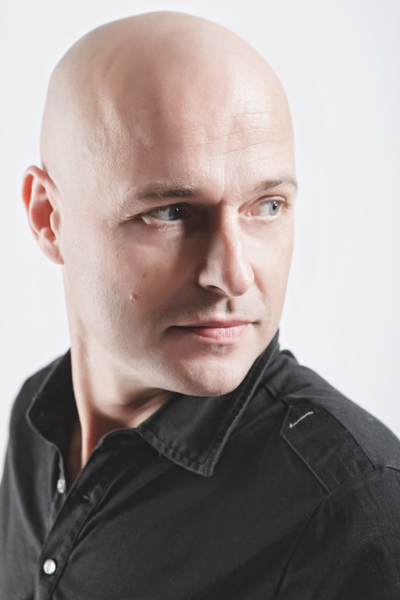
- Marco V in 2010

Background information
- Also known as: Marco V, Collusion, Vision 20/20
- Born: Marco Verkuijlen; 3 April 1966 (age 60)
- Origin: Netherlands
- Genres: Tech trance, electro house, big room house, progressive house
- Occupations: Record producer, DJ
- Years active: 1991 - Present
- Labels: TAO Recordings, Flamingo Recordings, Spinnin' Records, Incharge, Revealed Recordings
- Website: marcov.nl

Marco Verkuijlen (pronounced [ˈmɑrkoː vərˈkœylə(n)], born 3 April 1966 in Dinther), who performs under the name Marco V and alias Vision 20/20, is a Dutch electronic music DJ. He is considered to be a pioneer of tech trance and one of the most important trance artists.

== Career ==
Marco V began his career in his teens as a DJ in Eindhoven, becoming well known in the local scene by the mid-1990s. He has achieved three hit singles in the Dutch Top 40 national chart, "Godd" and "Simulated", both in 2002, and "Loops and Tings Relooped" in 2004. In 2004, DJ Mag ranked him as the 16th top DJ in the world, and he remained in the top 50 annually until 2009.

Marco V at Trance Energy in 2008

== Discography ==
=== Albums ===
Title	Release date	Notes
Massive		Mix CD
Innercity 2000		Mix CD
Innercity 2002		Mix CD (double album with studio partner Benjamin Bates)
Con:fusion	March 2002	Biggest selling dance album 2002 (Holland)
Electro Trance	2003	Given away with Mixmag, CD
Gatecrasher presents Crasher Live in Amsterdam & Kuala Lumpur	2004	Live Mix CD with Scott Bond
All Access	2004	Mix album
Combi:nations	2004	Mix CD
Guvernment: All Access	2004	Mix CD
Bosh Anthems 2004	December 2004	Given away with Mixmag, CD
Amnesia Vol. 1	2005	Mix CD
200V	2005	CD/DVD
Amnesia Vol. 2	2006	Mix CD
Combi:nations 2	October 2006	
Combi:nations 3	2007	CD
Propaganda Pt. 1	2009	
Propaganda Pt. 2	November 2009	

=== Singles and extended plays ===
- 1998: "The Vibes (Want You Back)"
- 1999: "The Message"
- 1999: "Heaven's Here"
- 1999: "Vision Phase 1 (of 3)"
- 2000: "Vision Phase 2 (of 3)"
- 2000: "Vision Phase 3 (of 3)"
- 2002: "GODD"
- 2002: "Indicator"
- 2002: "Simulated"
- 2002: "Con:fusion Album Sampler Pt. 1"
- 2003: "Con:fusion Album Sampler Pt. 2"
- 2003: "C:/del*.mp3/ Solarize"
- 2003: "Loops & Tings"
- 2004/2005: "Loops & Tings (Relooped)" (vs Jens O)
- 2005: "Automanual"
- 2005: "More Than a Life Away"
- 2005: "Second Bite"
- 2006: "False Light"
- 2006: "200V - UK EP"
- 2008: "Dudak"
- 2008: "Sessions"
- 2009: "Unprepared"
- 2009: "Solitary Confinement (Remixed)"
- 2010: "Reaver"
- 2010: "Provider"
- 2010: "Contour"
- 2011: "Groove Machine" (with Paul Oakenfold)
- 2011: "Sticker"
- 2011: "Be There in the Morning" (with Felix Maginn)
- 2011: "Kalevala" (with Russell G)
- 2011: "Rokker"
- 2011: "Essence" (with Damien William)
- 2012: "Analogital"
- 2012: "Scream" (with Marcel Woods)
- 2012: "Solid Sounds"
- 2012: "GOHF"
- 2012: "Engine Is More Than a Life Away" (with De Leon & Gum Me)
- 2012: "10 PM"
- 2012: "TGV"
- 2012: "Lotus" (with Doctors in Florence)
- 2012: "Bash" (with Jochen Miller)
- 2013: "Walhalla"
- 2013: "Hypergenic Supersonic Futuristic Monophonic "
- 2013: "Quake" (with Alex Guesta & Stefano Pain)
- 2013: "Frozen Heart" (with Christian Burns)
- 2013: "Bugabull"
- 2013: "Naneo" (with Damian William)
- 2013: "Saxonized"
- 2013: "Waiting (For the End)" (featuring Marjula Retana)
- 2013: "Sunset BLVD"
- 2013: "Krezy"
- 2014: "Back In The Jungle"
- 2014: "Pegasus" (with Robin Riccio and Holl & Rush)
- 2014: "MET"
- 2014: "Jaguar" (with Thomas Newson)
- 2014: "Chayton"
- 2014: "Nashoba"
- 2014: "Chogan" (with East & Young)
- 2015: "Ngorongoro"
- 2015: "Chikago"
- 2015: "Squeezed" (with Brian Cross)
- 2015: "We Will Be"
- 2015: "Together" (with Thomas Newson) (featuring Rumors)
- 2015: "My Trip"
- 2015: "Africa" (with O.B)
- 2015: "Tumbleweed" (with Thomas Newson)
- 2016: "Thump" (with O.B)
- 2016: "The Human Puzzle"
- 2017: "Lost World Anthem 2017" (with Signum)
- 2017: "Aranck"
- 2021: "HU/NT"
