= Go Go Go! (Lethal Bizzle song) =

Single by Lethal Bizzle & Nick Bridges featuring Luciana

from the album Best of Bizzle
- Released: 16 May 2010
- Genre: Dance; grime
- Length: 2:43
- Label: Search and Destroy
- Songwriter(s): Maxwell Ansah, Nick Bridges, Luciana Caporaso, Nick Clow

Lethal Bizzle singles chronology
"Going Out Tonight" (2009)	"Go Go Go!" (2010)	"Pow 2011" (2011)

"Go Go Go!" is a single by UK independent grime artist Lethal Bizzle and House DJ Nick Bridges. It was released from the compilation album Best of Bizzle. It was released on 16 May 2010 as a Digital download. The song features vocals from Luciana.

== Music video ==
A music video to accompany the release of "Go Go Go!" was first released onto YouTube on 6 April 2010 at a total length of two minutes and forty-four seconds.

== Track listing ==
- Digital download - EP
1. "Go Go Go!" (Radio Edit) - 2:43
2. "Go Go Go!" (Club Mix) - 4:13
3. "Go Go Go!" (Jacob Plant Mix) - 3:25
4. "Go Go Go!" (feat. Luciana) [Music video] - 2:45

== Charts ==
Chart performance for "Go Go Go!"
Chart (2010)	Peak position
Australia (ARIA) Neon Stereo Remix	67
UK Dance (OCC)	26

== Release history ==
Region	Date	Format	Label
United Kingdom	16 May 2010	Digital download	Search and Destroy
