= Badman Riddim (Jump) =

Single by Vato Gonzalez featuring Foreign Beggars
- Released: 19 June 2011
- Recorded: 2007–2010
- Genre: Dirty house
- Length: 2:46
- Label: Ministry of Sound
- Songwriter(s): Henry Ritson, Pavan Mukhi, Ebow Graham, Bjorn Franken

Vato Gonzalez singles chronology
"Take This Higher" (2010)	"Badman Riddim (Jump)" (2011)	"Not a Saint" (2013)

"Badman Riddim (Jump)" is a song by Dutch DJ/producer Vato Gonzalez featuring vocals from British hip hop/grime group Foreign Beggars. It was released on 19 June 2011 as a digital download in the United Kingdom. It contains samples of "Gojira Tai Mosura", the theme song from the 1992 sci-fi film Godzilla vs. Mothra, by Japanese composer Akira Ifukube. The same sample was used in the Pharoahe Monch hit song "Simon Says".

The song is featured as part of the soundtrack for FIFA Street. Until February 2025, it was also one of the songs played at the Totally Wicked Stadium when its home team St. Helens R.F.C. scores a try.

== Music video ==
A music video to accompany the release of "Badman Riddim (Jump)" was first released onto YouTube on 18 May 2011 at a total length of 2 minutes and fifty-two seconds.

== Track listing ==
Digital download
No.	Title	Length
1.	"Badman Riddim (Jump)" (Radio Edit)	2:45
2.	"Badman Riddim (Jump)" (Extended)	5:02
3.	"Badman Riddim (Jump)" (Tru_Fix & Thunderskank Vocal Mix)	5:03
4.	"Badman Riddim (Jump)" (Mark Maitland Mix)	6:12
5.	"Badman Riddim" (Friction Mix)	4:26
6.	"Badman Riddim (Jump)" (Static Shock Vocal Mix)	6:36
7.	"Badman Riddim (Jump)" (Dem 2's Late Night At Mandy Mix)	4:42
8.	"Badman Riddim (Jump)" (7th Heaven Mix)	6:15
9.	"Badman Riddim (Jump)" (Dem 2'd Burnin' Da Kood Mix)	4:34
10.	"Badman Riddim" (Instrumental)	4:48

== Charts ==
=== Weekly charts ===
Chart (2011)	Peak position
Netherlands (Single Top 100)	76
Scotland (OCC)	9
UK Singles (OCC)	7
UK Indie (OCC)	2
UK Hip Hop/R&B (OCC)	2

=== Year-end charts ===
Chart (2011)	Position
UK Singles (OCC)	144

== Certifications ==
Region	Certification	Certified units/sales
United Kingdom (BPI)	Silver	200,000^{‡}
^{‡} Sales+streaming figures based on certification alone.

== Release history ==
Region	Date	Format	Label
United Kingdom	19 June 2011	Digital download	Ministry of Sound
United States	27 September 2011	Digital download	Robbins Entertainment
