= Soundbwoy =

Single by Stylo G
- Released: 26 May 2013
- Recorded: 2012–13
- Genre: Reggae; electro
- Length: 3:48
- Label: 3Beat
- Songwriter(s): Jason McDermott; Raoul Chen
- Producer(s): Diztortion

Stylo G singles chronology
| "Mama (Give Me a Call)" (2013) | "Soundbwoy" (2013) | "Badd" (2013) |

"Soundbwoy" is a song by British singer Stylo G. It was produced by Dutch born producer Diztortion. The song was released in the United Kingdom as a digital download on 26 May 2013 on iTunes. The song entered the UK Singles Chart at number 18 and at number 29 in Scotland.

== Music video ==
A music video to accompany the release of "Soundbwoy" was first released onto YouTube on 8 March 2013 at a total length of two minutes and forty-four seconds.

== Track listing ==
Digital download
| No. | Title | Length |
|---|---|---|
| 1. | "Soundbwoy" (Original Mix) | 3:48 |
| 2. | "Soundbwoy" (Di Genius Remix) | 3:23 |
| 3. | "Soundbwoy" (Sigma Remix) | 4:24 |
| 4. | "Soundbwoy" (Ross Couch Club Mix) | 5:46 |

== Charts ==
| Chart (2013) | Peak positions |
|---|---|
| Belgium (Ultratip Bubbling Under Flanders) | 18 |
| Belgium (Ultratop Flanders Dance) | 22 |
| Belgium (Ultratop Flanders Urban) | 34 |
| Scotland (OCC) | 29 |
| UK Singles (OCC) | 18 |

== Release history ==
| Country | Date | Format | Label |
|---|---|---|---|
| United Kingdom | 26 May 2013 | Digital download | 3Beat |
