= Party Right =

Single by Lethal Bizzle featuring Ruby Goe
- Released: 25 August 2013
- Genre: Dance; electronic
- Length: 3:16
- Label: New State Music
- Songwriter(s): Maxwell Ansah, Raoul Chen, Modwenna Holland

Lethal Bizzle singles chronology
"They Got It Wrong" (2013)	"Party Right" (2013)	"The Drop" (2014)

Ruby Goe singles chronology
"Never Gonna Let You Go" (2013)	"Party Right" (2013)

"Party Right" is a single by English Grime artist Lethal Bizzle, featuring vocals from British pop recording artist Ruby Goe. It was released on 25 August 2013 for digital download in the United Kingdom. The song has peaked at number 29 on the UK Singles Chart.

== Music video ==
A music video to accompany the release of "Party Right" was first released onto YouTube on 6 August 2013 at a total length of three minutes and thirty-four seconds.

== Track listings ==
Digital download - Single
No.	Title	Length
1.	"Party Right" (feat. Ruby Goe) (Radio Edit)	3:16

Digital download - EP
No.	Title	Length
1.	"Party Right" (Radio Edit) (feat. Ruby Goe)	3:16
2.	"Party Right" (Extended Mix) (feat. Ruby Goe)	4:11
3.	"Party Right" (GLOWINTHEDARK Remix) (feat. Ruby Goe)	5:39
4.	"Party Right" (Friend Within Remix) (feat. Ruby Goe)	6:17
5.	"Party Right" (Charlie Traplin Remix) (feat. Ruby Goe)	3:18
6.	"Party Right" (Opal City Remix) (feat. Ruby Goe)	3:58

== Chart performance ==
=== Weekly charts ===
Chart (2013)	Peak position
Scotland (OCC)	26
UK Hip Hop/R&B (OCC)	5
UK Singles (OCC)	29

== Release history ==
Country	Date	Format	Label
United Kingdom	25 August 2013	Digital download	New State Music
United Kingdom	8 September 2013	Digital download	New State Music
