= The Drop (Lethal Bizzle song) =

Single by Lethal Bizzle featuring Cherri Voncelle
- Released: 4 May 2014
- Genre: Dance; electronic
- Length: 2:54
- Label: New State Music
- Songwriter(s): Maxwell Ansah, Raoul Chen, Cherice Leachman
- Producer(s): DJ Semtex

Lethal Bizzle singles chronology
"Party Right" (2013)	"The Drop" (2014)	"Rari WorkOut" (2014)

Cherri Voncelle singles chronology
"The Drop" (2014)

"The Drop" is a single by English Grime artist Lethal Bizzle, featuring vocals from British R&B and soul recording artist Cherri Voncelle. It was released on 4 May 2014 for digital download in the United Kingdom. The song has peaked at number 20 on the UK Singles Chart.

== Music video ==
A music video to accompany the release of "The Drop" was first released onto YouTube on 1 June 2014 at a total length of two minutes and fifty-nine seconds.

== Track listings ==
Digital download - Single
No.	Title	Length
1.	"The Drop" (feat. Cherri Voncelle)	2:54

Digital download - EP
No.	Title	Length
1.	"The Drop" (Radio Edit) (feat. Cherri Voncelle)	2:54
2.	"The Drop" (Jay Hardway Remix) (feat. Cherri Voncelle)	4:38
3.	"The Drop" (TREI Remix) (feat. Cherri Voncelle)	4:26
4.	"The Drop" (DevelopMENT Remix) (feat. Cherri Voncelle)	4:30
5.	"The Drop" (Paul Morrell Remix) (feat. Cherri Voncelle)	5:08

== Chart performance ==
=== Weekly charts ===
Chart (2014)	Peak position
Scotland (OCC)	30
UK Hip Hop/R&B (OCC)	3
UK Singles (OCC)	20

== Release history ==
Country	Date	Format	Label
United Kingdom	4 May 2014	Digital download	New State Music
United Kingdom	1 June 2014	Digital download	New State Music
