= Vato Gonzalez =

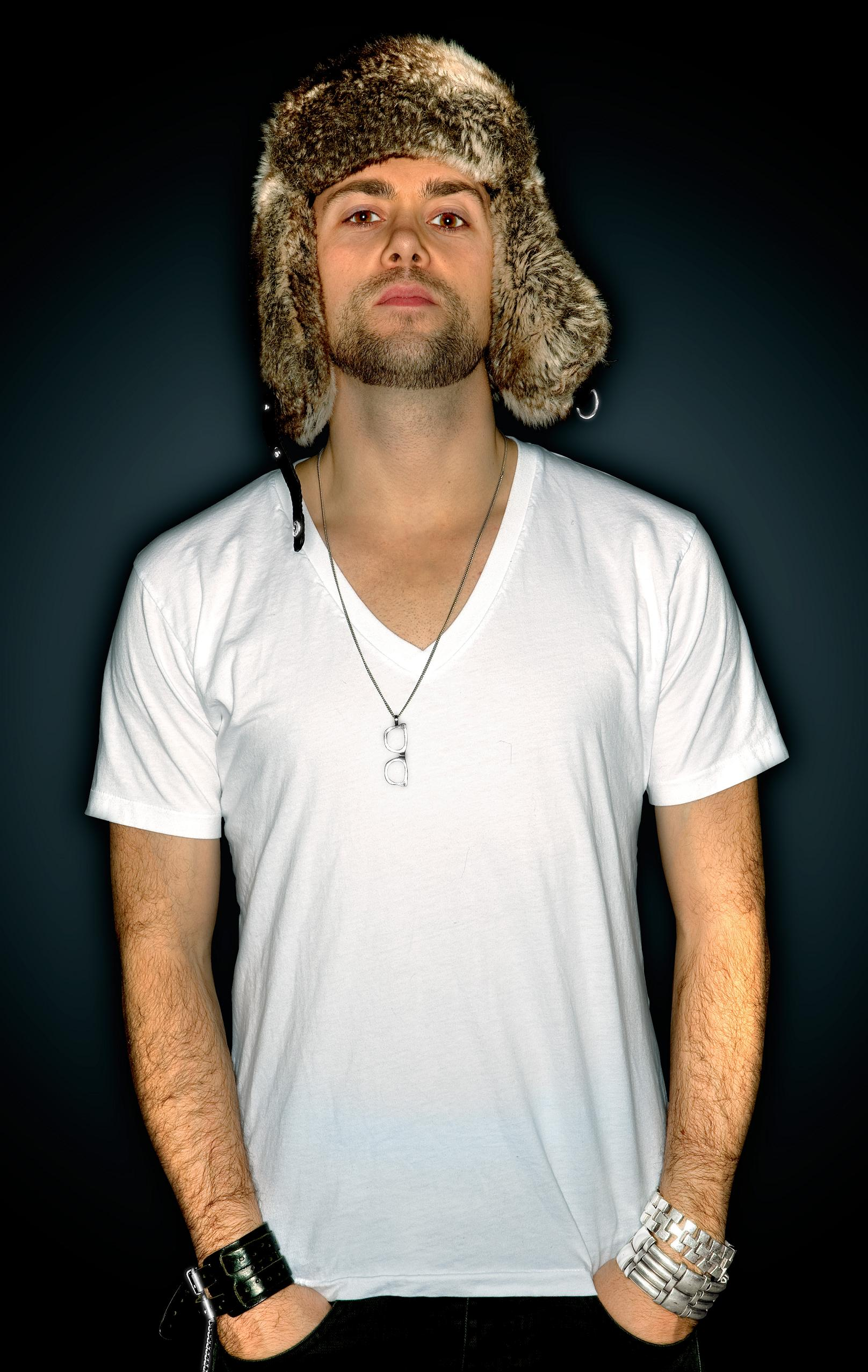

Background information
- Born: Björn Franken; 6 June 1983 (age 43)
- Origin: Spijkenisse, Netherlands
- Genres: Electro house; Dutch house; Future house; Bass House
- Labels: Levels Recordings, Crowd Control, Ministry of Sound, Spinnin' Records, DOORN Records
- Website: www.vatogonzalez.com

Björn Franken (born 6 June 1983), known professionally as Vato Gonzalez, is a Dutch record producer, songwriter, artist, DJ, who is signed to Spinnin' Records and DOORN Records. Best known for his single Badman Riddim (Jump) (featuring Foreign Beggars), which reached No. 7 on the UK Singles Chart after a release on 19 June 2011.

== Biography ==
=== Early life ===
Franken was born in Spijkenisse, Netherlands. As a teenager he developed an interest in graphic design before he started to focus on making music.

=== 2007–2009: Dirty House ===
Between 2007 and 2009 Franken released 5 mixtapes in the 'Dirty House' series, It was around the time of this release he and this song started to gain mainstream attention.

=== 2010–present: Badman Riddim ===
Badman Riddim, in addition to a vocal version which featured UK hip-hop/grime/dubstep group Foreign Beggars and was given the new title Badman Riddim, began to start gaining airplay from some BBC Radio 1 DJs in the UK in late 2010. As attention for the single started to grow Franken was signed to Ministry of Sound and a music video was made for the song. The single was released in the UK on 19 June 2011 and entered the UK Singles Chart at No. 7, the first hit in the country for both acts involved.

On 7 January 2013, Not a Saint was released. It features Lethal Bizzle and Donae'o. It is a remix of the same song by Bizzle and Donae'o. The remix featured positive feedback and was released as a collaborative single. It peaked at number 20 in the UK Singles Chart.

Since late 2013, Franken signed to DOORN Records. He released his first song under the label, "Triplets Riddim" on 30 December 2013. There is a scheduled upcoming single "Bio Riddim" of which the release date will soon be announced.

== Discography ==
=== Singles ===
| Single | Year | Peak chart positions | | | Certifications | Album |
| Single | Year | NL | UK | SCO | Certifications | Album |
|---|---|---|---|---|---|---|
| "Take This Higher" | 2010 | — | — | — | | Non-album singles |
| "Badman Riddim (Jump)" (featuring Foreign Beggars) | 2011 | 74 | 7 | 9 | BPI: Silver | Non-album singles |
| "Not a Saint" (Vato Gonzalez vs. Lethal Bizzle & Donae'o) | 2013 | — | 20 | 22 | | Non-album singles |
| "$100 Infinite Kung Fu Vixens" (with Sinden) | 2013 | — | — | — | | Non-album singles |
| "Sushi Riddim" | 2013 | — | — | — | | Non-album singles |
| "Triplets Riddim" | 2013 | — | — | — | | Non-album singles |
| "Volfied Riddim" | 2014 | — | — | — | | Non-album singles |
| "Bio Riddim" | 2014 | — | — | — | | Non-album singles |
| "B52 Riddim" | 2014 | — | — | — | | Non-album singles |
| "Monkey Riddim" (featuring Tjen) | 2014 | — | — | — | | Non-album singles |
| "Violet Nights" (with Mucky) | 2015 | — | — | — | | Non-album singles |
| "Push Riddim" | 2016 | — | — | — | | Heldeep DJ Tools EP - Part 2 |
| "2 Step" (featuring Doctor) | 2016 | — | — | — | | Non-album singles |
| "Hyper Riddim" (with Sebastian Bronk) | 2016 | — | — | — | | Non-album singles |
| "Sonic Boom" (featuring Kris Kiss) | 2016 | — | — | — | | Non-album singles |
| "Bassline Riddim" | 2017 | — | — | — | | Heldeep DJ Tools EP - Part 4 |
| "X-Ray Vision" (featuring Kris Kiss) | 2017 | — | — | — | | Non-album single |
| "Bump & Grind (Bassline Riddim)" (featuring Scrufizzer) | 2018 | — | — | — | | Non-album single |
"—" denotes single that did not chart or was not released.

=== Remixes ===
| Year | Artist | Title | Label |
|---|---|---|---|
| 2011 | Sway | "Still Speedin'" | 3 Beat Records |
| 2011 | DJ Zinc ft. Ms. Dynamite | "Wile Out" | Zinc Music |
| 2011 | RD | "Burning" | Polydor |
| 2012 | Skepta | "Hold On" | 3 Beat Records |
| 2012 | Taio Cruz | "Troublemaker" | Island Records |
| 2012 | The 2 Bears | "Take a Look Around" | Southern Fried Records |
| 2012 | Rizzle Kicks | "Mama Do the hump" | Island Records |
| 2012 | Major Lazer | "Jah No Partial (ft. Flux Pavilion)" | Mad Decent |

=== Remix EPs ===
| Title | Details | Tracklist |
|---|---|---|
| $100 Infinite Kung Fu Vixens (with Sinden) | Released: April 19, 2013; Label: Sweat It Out Music; Formats: Digital download | $100 Infinite Kung Fu Vixens (with Sinden); $100 Infinite Kung Fu Vixens (with Sinden) (Go Freek Remix); $100 Infinite Kung Fu Vixens (with Sinden) (Indian Summer Remix) |
