= Thomas Newson =

Dutch DJ & record producer (born 1994)

- Born: Tommy Verkuijlen; 10 May 1994 (age 32); Heeswijk-Dinther, Netherlands
- Genres: Tech-house; House
- Occupations: Musician; DJ; record producer
- Instruments: Piano; Guitar; Synthesizer
- Years active: 2012–present
- Labels: Armada Music; Revealed Recordings; Protocol Recordings; Spinnin' Records; Doorn Records; Musical Freedom; Smash The House
- Website: thomasnewson.com/

Tommy Verkuijlen (born 10 May 1994 in Heeswijk-Dinther, Netherlands), better known by his stage name Thomas Newson, is a Dutch DJ and record producer.

== Biography ==
In 2012, he signed his first record "Delta" with OXYGEN Records. His single Flute, released in 2013 in collaboration with New World Sound has made him known internationally, and was ranked in many international charts. The single is viewed more than 100 million times on YouTube.

He is the son of DJ and producer Marco V, with whom he has collaborated multiple times.

== Discography ==
=== Singles ===
==== Charted singles ====
Year	Title	Peak chart positions												Album
Year	Title	NLD	AUS	AUT	BEL (Vl)	BEL (Wa)	FRA	GER	IRL	SWE	SWI	UK	UK Dance	Album
2013	"Flute" (with New World Sound)	55	—	—	13	3	10	—	—	—	59	—	—	Non-album singles
2014	"Flutes" (with New World Sound featuring Lethal Bizzle)	—	—	—	—	—	—	—	—	—	—	67	13	Non-album singles
2015	"Wave Your Hands" (with Bassjackers)	—	—	—	62^{[A]}	—	—	—	—	—	—	—	—	Non-album singles
"—" denotes a recording that did not chart or was not released in that territory.

==== Other singles ====
- 2012: Delta [Oxygen (Spinnin)]
- 2012: Krypton / Phantom [Big & Dirty]
- 2013: Neutron [In Charge (Be Yourself Music)]
- 2013: Flute (with New World Sound) [Doorn (Spinnin)]
- 2013: Pallaroid [Revealed Recordings]
- 2014: Kalavela (with John Dish) [Musical Freedom]
- 2014: Don't Hold Us (featuring Angelika Vee) [Zouk Recordings (Armada)]
- 2014: Jaguar (with Marco V) [Spinnin Records]
- 2014: Blackwolf (with Magnificence) [Spinnin Records]
- 2014: Ravefield [Revealed Recordings]
- 2014: Blizzard (with Magnificence) [Protocol Recordings]
- 2014: Taurus (with Futuristic Polar Bears) [Revealed Recordings]
- 2014: Bells At Midnight (featuring Melanie Fontana) [In Charge (Be Yourself Music)]
- 2014: Elephant (with Jaz Von D) [Revealed Recordings]
- 2015: Wave Your Hands (with Bassjackers) [Smash The House]
- 2015: Black (with MAKJ) [Protocol Recordings]
- 2015: Timecode (with Joey Dale) [Revealed Recordings]
- 2015: Summer Vibes [Armada Music]
- 2015: Vandals (with Sandro Silva) [Smash The House]
- 2015: Together (with Marco V featuring Rumors) [Armada Music]
- 2015: Shakedown [Revealed Recordings]
- 2015: Tumbleweed (with Marco V) [Flamingo]
- 2016: Home Is Where The Heart Is (with Asonn) [Revealed Recordings]
- 2016: 8Fifty (with Hardwell) [Revealed Recordings]
- 2016: Back Again (with Manse) [Revealed Recordings]
- 2016: Tonight (with Magnificence featuring Alex Joseph) [Revealed Recordings]
- 2017: Saxo (with Will K) [Flamingo Recordings]
- 2017: Two Circles [Free download]
- 2017: Be With You (featuring Alex Joseph) [Sono Music]
- 2017: Combat [Revealed Recordings]
- 2018: I'll House You (vs. Sunnery James & Ryan Marciano) [Sono Music]
- 2018: Ragga [Revealed Recordings]
- 2018: Heartbeat (featuring Jareth) [Sono Music]
- 2018: No More (with Dannic) [Fonk Recordings]
- 2018: The Worker [Armada Deep]
- 2018: Oh Babe (with Jack Note) [Revealed Music]
- 2019: La Dingo [Sono Music]
- 2019: Goes Like This [Musical Freedom]
- 2019: 6 Feet (with Mahmut Orhan featuring Jason Gaffner) [Young Gunz Music]
- 2020: In The Club (Armada Music)
- 2020: I Got Y'All (Armada Music)
- 2021: Raining On (with Marc Volt) (Armada Music)
- 2021: Ocean Deep (with Tim van Werd) [Protocol Recordings]
- 2021: Skin (featuring Bertie Scott) [Protocol Recordings]
- 2022: Tech Party (Insomniac Records)
- 2022: Nuestro Amigo (with Tom & Collins and Kenny Brian) [The Myth of Nyx]
- 2022: The Ladder (with 71 Digits) [Spinnin' Records]
- 2022: C'Mon Baby (Be Yourself Music)
- 2022: Bad Girls (Controversia Records)

=== Remixes and edits ===
- 2014: Mystery Skulls - Ghost (Thomas Newson Remix) [Warner Bros]
- 2014: Armin van Buuren and Lauren Evans - Alone (Thomas Newson Remix) [Armind (Armada)]
- 2014: Hardwell and Joey Dale - Arcadia (featuring Luciana) (Thomas Newson Remix) [Revealed Recordings]
- 2014: Mako - Our Story (Thomas Newson Remix) [Ultra]
- 2014: Marco V - Nashoba (Thomas Newson Remix) [Flamingo Recordings]
- 2016: Asonn - Banga (Thomas Newson Edit) [Revealed Recordings]
- 2016: Galantis - Louder, Harder, Better (Thomas Newson Remix) [Big Beat Records]
- 2017: Sevn Alias - Patsergedrag (featuring Lil' Kleine and Boef) (Thomas Newson and Giocatori Remix) [Free Download]
- 2018: Abel Ramos - Revolution Drums (Thomas Newson Edit) [Revealed Recordings]
- 2019: Superspecial - Heroes (Thomas Newson Edit) [Desirmont]
- 2019: Dannic - Tell Me (If You Really Love Me) (Thomas Newson Remix) [Spinnin' Records]
- 2020: Hagenaar & Albrecht - What would we do? (Thomas Newson Remix) [Spinnin' Records]
- 2021: Maddoxx - Burning (Thomas Newson Remix) [Armada Music]
- 2022: DJ Kuba and Neitan & Bounce Inc - Watch Out (Kryder and Thomas Newson Remix) [Spinnin' Records]
