= New World Sound =

- Origin: Gold Coast, Queensland, Australia
- Genres: EDM
- Years active: 2011–present
- Labels: Spinnin', Doorn Records, LE7ELS, Dim Mak
- Members: Tyrone James; Jesse Taylor
- Website: newworldsound.com

New World Sound is an Australian electronic DJ and record production duo, composed of Tyrone James and Jesse Taylor. In 2013, they released the single, "Flute", with Thomas Newson.

== Career ==
=== 2012–present ===
On 5 November 2012 New World Sound released their debut single "Bantam". On 31 May 2013 they released the single "Cube" with Ryan Kristo. On 27 September 2013 they released the single "Aye". In November 2013 they released the single "Flute" with Thomas Newson. The song charted in Belgium, France, Netherlands and Switzerland. On 28 February 2014 they released the single "Shakedown" with Uberjak'D. On 25 April 2014 they released the single "Colors" with Osen featuring vocals from Juanita Timpanaro. On 16 May 2014 they released the single "The Buzz" with Timmy Trumpet. On 17 June 2014 they released the single "Pineapple" / "Spoon". On 15 August 2014 they released the single "How to Twerk". On 21 December 2014 New World Sound and Thomas Newson released a second version of "Flute" in the UK with vocals from Lethal Bizzle titled "Flutes".

== Discography ==
=== Singles ===
| Title | Year | Peak chart positions | | | | | Album |
| Title | Year | BEL (Vl) | BEL (Wa) | FRA | NLD | SWI | Album |
|---|---|---|---|---|---|---|---|
| "Bantam" | 2012 | — | — | — | — | — | Non-album singles |
| "Cube" (with Ryan Kristo) | 2013 | — | — | — | — | — | Non-album singles |
| "Aye" | 2013 | — | — | — | — | — | Non-album singles |
| "Flute" (with Thomas Newson) | 2013 | 13 | 3 | 10 | 55 | 59 | Non-album singles |
| "Shakedown" (with Uberjak'D) | 2014 | — | — | — | — | — | Non-album singles |
| "Colors" (with Osen featuring Juanita Timpanaro) | 2014 | — | — | — | — | — | Non-album singles |
| "The Buzz" (with Timmy Trumpet) | 2014 | — | — | — | — | — | Non-album singles |
| "Pineapple" / "Spoon" | 2014 | — | — | — | — | — | Non-album singles |
| "Muzz" | 2014 | — | — | — | — | — | Non-album singles |
| "How to Twerk" | 2014 | — | — | — | — | — | Non-album singles |
| "Cheer Up" | 2014 | — | — | — | — | — | Non-album singles |
| "Flutes" (with Thomas Newson featuring Lethal Bizzle) | 2014 | — | — | — | — | — | Non-album singles |
| "Bounce That" / "Buoy" | 2015 | — | — | — | — | — | Non-album singles |
| "Gold Diggin'" | 2015 | — | — | — | — | — | Non-album singles |
| "Breathe" | 2016 | — | — | — | — | — | Non-album singles |
| "Lies" (with Will Sparks) | 2020 | — | — | — | — | — | Non-album singles |
| "Feel Good" | 2020 | — | — | — | — | — | Non-album singles |
"—" denotes a single that did not chart or was not released in that territory.
