= Oi! (song) =

2002 Single by More Fire Crew

Single by More Fire Crew

from the album More Fire Crew C.V.
- Released: 4 March 2002
- Recorded: 2001
- Genre: Grime; garage
- Length: 4:33
- Label: Go Beat
- Songwriters: Lethal Bizzle; Ozzie B; Neeko
- Producer: Platinum 45

More Fire Crew singles chronology
"Oi!" (2002)	"Back Then" (2003)

"Oi!" is the debut single by English grime group More Fire Crew, taken from their debut studio album More Fire Crew C.V. It was first released as a promotional single in 2001, and later released commercially on 4 March 2002.

"Oi!" became one of the first grime songs to receive attention outside of London, peaking at number 8 on the official UK Singles Chart with over 80,000 sales in 2002. It also received widespread airplay on Channel U after its launch in 2003, becoming one of the most well-known songs in its genre.

== Background ==
After forming one of the first grime collectives in the early 2000s, childhood friends Lethal Bizzle, Ozzie B and Neeko quickly became one of the better-known acts in the emerging genre, thanks to their appearances on pirate radio stations, particularly Deja Vu FM, one of London's biggest pirate radio stations at the time. They began working on their debut studio album and collaborated with producer Platinum 45 on their debut single, "Oi!". The song takes influence from both the grime and UK garage sounds, incorporating heavy bass and numerous elements of garage music. Because of their relationship with Platinum 45, the song was released through some platforms as Platinum 45 featuring More Fire Crew.

== Music video ==
An accompanying music video was included on the CD single release as the 4th track, and shows More Fire Crew in a house party, with all three involved in different scenarios. Lethal Bizzle is standing outside of the apartment block where it is taking place, Ozzie B is inside the party surrounded by women on a couch, and Neeko is playing craps on the roof. The video received a significant amount of airplay on the newly launched Channel U throughout 2003, becoming one of the channel's most popular requests during its early years.

== Track listing ==
- CD
1. "Oi! (Original Mix)" – 4:33
2. "Oi! (L Stone Remix)" – 4:45
3. "Oi! (Instrumental Mix)" – 4:38
4. "Oi! (Directors Cut)" (music video) – 4:38
- 12"

A1. "Oi! (Original)" – 4:33
B1. "Oi! (Slim Ting Remix)" – 4:45
B2. "Oi! (Instrumental)" – 4:38

- Cassette
1. "Oi! (Radio Edit)" – 3:20
2. "Oi! (L Stone Remix)" – 4:35
- CD (promo)
1. "Oi! (Original Mix)" – 4:33

== Chart performance ==
"Oi!" became one of the first ever grime songs to achieve mainstream success, entering the UK Singles Chart in March 2002 and peaking at number 8 for the week of 16 March 2002.

== Charts ==
Chart (2002)	Peak position
UK Singles (OCC)	8
