= Against the Odds: Making a Difference in Global Health =

Exhibition at the United States National Library of Medicine

Against the Odds: Making a Difference in Global Health is an exhibition that opened to the public at the United States National Library of Medicine on April 17, 2008. The exhibition explored aspects of the history of global health as well as contemporary issues and "champions holistic solutions to health problems." Materials from the History of Medicine Division of the library were on display alongside artifacts and images gathered from around the world. Featured stories included the Barefoot doctors of China, the impact of Hurricane Katrina on health care in the Mississippi Gulf region, the work of the International Campaign to Ban Landmines, and activism and the AIDS Coalition to Unleash Power.

== History ==
The exhibition was developed over three years of research by the Exhibition Program of the History of Medicine Division. At the exhibition launch on April 16, 2008 an audience of young people from Washington DC, Maryland, and Virginia heard from a panel of speakers that featured Jeanne White Ginder, mother of the late Ryan White and an advocate for people living with HIV and AIDS, and Dr. H. Jack Geiger, a co-founder of Physicians for Social Responsibility and director of one of the first community health centers in the United States at Mound Bayou, Mississippi. The panel also included Niko and Theo Milonopoulos, who founded Kidz Voice-LA and Vox Populi after a series of shootings in their hometown, North Hollywood, and other young activists involved in global health issues.

== Online Exhibition ==
The gallery exhibition was on display until 2010, and a traveling version toured US public health schools in the fall of 2008. The exhibition web site will be permanently available: a section called 'Get Involved' provides information on launching health campaigns as well as opportunities to share views on global health problems and solutions.
