= Back to Bizznizz =

Studio album by Lethal Bizzle
- Released: 23 July 2007
- Recorded: 2006–2007
- Genre: Grime
- Label: V2 Records
- Producer: Dexplicit, Lethal Bizzle Records, Akira the Don, Static, J-Sweet, Mr Hudson, Fingaz & Youngstar

Lethal Bizzle chronology
Against All Oddz (2005)	Back to Bizznizz (2007)	Go Hard (2009)

Back to Bizznizz is the second album by grime artist Lethal Bizzle. It was released on 23 July 2007.

== Track listing ==
No.	Title	Producer(s)	Length
1.	"Intro"	Dexplicit	0:41
2.	"Mr"	Dexplicit	2:27
3.	"Bizzle Bizzle"	Lethal Bizzle Records	2:30
4.	"Babylon's Burning The Ghetto"	Akira the Don	2:43
5.	"Boy" (featuring Babyshambles)	Static	2:58
6.	"Look What You Done" (featuring Kate Nash)	Static	3:23
7.	"The Come Up"	J-Sweet	3:15
8.	"My Eyes"	Mr Hudson	3:22
9.	"Sometimes I Think"	Fingaz & Youngstar	3:17
10.	"Police On My Back"	Akira The Don	3:18
11.	"Selfridges Girl Not On Myspace"	Static	2:53
12.	"You'll Get Wrapped" (featuring Ghetto & Slinga R.I.P.)	J-Sweet	3:28
13.	"Reflecting"	Akira The Don	6:40
