= More Fire Crew =

British music group

- Origin: Waltham Forest, London, England
- Genres: Grime
- Years active: 2000–2005; 2021–present
- Labels: Go! Beat; Rosebank; Rhythm Rollers
- Members: Ozzie B; Neeko; Sean Bartana; Lethal Bizzle (select performances)

More Fire Crew are an English grime crew from Waltham Forest, whose 2002 single "Oi!" with Platinum 45 was widely recognised as the first grime song to reach the UK Singles Chart, peaking at number eight.

== Background ==
While enrolled on a sound engineering training programme, Ozzie B first met Neeko, who was at the time a member of an existing crew called Mad Dog. Together, the pair established More Fire Crew, its name an homage to the album by Jamaican dancehall deejay Capleton which had been released shortly beforehand. The duo were soon joined by Lethal Bizzle, with whom they had attended secondary school, and their friend Seani B, who was a DJ on Amy FM. They initially gained recognition as the hosts of a show on Deja Vu FM, one of London's biggest pirate radio stations at the time.

The group are best known for their 2002 single "Oi!", which reached number eight on the UK Singles Chart, making it the first grime song to achieve chart success. In 2003, their debut studio album More Fire Crew CV was released, and they contributed a track to the album NME & War Child Presents 1 Love which samples Gabrielle's "Dreams" and produced by Sticky. In the same year they were dropped by their record label, with Lethal setting up his own eponymous record label and going on to a successful solo career.

In 2004, Bizzle enlisted in Ozzie B and Neeko among others to feature on his eight-bar rally track "Pow! (Forward)", with the group's three members credited as individuals rather than collectively. The song was another chart success for the trio, reaching number eleven in the UK, but was banned from many clubs at the time due to its controversially violent lyrics. However, a falling out between Lethal Bizzle and Neeko related to the song's lyrics culminated in the disbandment of the trio shortly after its release. Lethal Bizzle and Ozzie B formed a successor crew known as Fire Camp, alongside MCs such as 2Face, Knowl£dg£ and Clipson.

"Pow! (Forward)" eventually went on to become what music journalist Dan Hancox described in a Guardian article as the "unofficial soundtrack" to the 2010 student protests against a rise in tuition fees. Lethal Bizzle, Ozzie B and Neeko reunited for a one-off performance of "Oi" at the GRM Daily Rated Awards 2017, during a medley performed by Bizzle as the recipient of the Legacy Award.

During the COVID-19 pandemic, Ozzie B, Neeko and Sean Bartana reformed the group for a series of 'More Fire Show' sets streamed on Instagram Live alongside special guests including Pay As U Go's Maxwell D and Aftershock's Bruza. Their comeback single under the More Fire banner, a collaboration with Doller and Fumin entitled "Tek", was released on 1 September 2021 via independent label Rosebank. They have since collaborated with Maxwell D and Doller on the 2022 single "Timeless", and have released multiple singles via independent label Rhythm Rollers, including "Local" in 2023 and "Rise & Bang" in 2024.

== Members ==
=== Present ===
- Neeko - MC
- Ozzie B - MC
- Sean Bartana, formerly known as Seani B - DJ

=== Past ===
- Lethal Bizzle - MC
- Commander B - DJ
- Gappy Ryder
- Twister

== Discography ==
=== Studio albums ===
Year	Album details	Peak chart positions
Year	Album details	UK
2003	More Fire Crew C.V.: Released: January 27, 2003; Label: Go Beat	—

=== Singles ===
Year	Single	Peak chart positions	Album
Year	Single	UK	Album
2002	"Oi!"	8	More Fire Crew C.V.
2003	"Back Then"	45	More Fire Crew C.V.
2003	"What's the Point?"	—	More Fire Crew C.V.
2021	"Tek" (with Doller and Fumin)	—	—N/a
2023	"Local"	—	—N/a
2024	"Rise & Bang" (with Mr Kelly-King)	—	—N/a
"—" denotes that the release failed to chart or was not released in that territory
