= They Got It Wrong =

Single by Lethal Bizzle featuring Wiley
- Released: 21 April 2013
- Genre: Hip hop; grime
- Length: 3:13
- Label: Stay Dench
- Songwriters: Lethal Bizzle, Dominique Chambers, Raoul Chen, Richard Cowie

Lethal Bizzle singles chronology
"Not a Saint" (2013)	"They Got It Wrong" (2013)	"Party Right" (2013)

Wiley singles chronology
"Reload" (2013)	"They Got It Wrong" (2013)	"Lights On" (2013)

"They Got It Wrong" is a song by English rapper Lethal Bizzle. It features vocals from British rapper Wiley. It was released on 21 April 2013 for digital download in the United Kingdom. The song has peaked at number 74 on the UK Singles Chart.

== Music video ==
A music video to accompany the release of "They Got It Wrong" was first released onto YouTube on 11 March 2013 at a total length of three minutes and eighteen seconds.

== Track listings ==
Digital download – single

1. "They Got It Wrong" (featuring Wiley) [Edit] – 3:13
2. "They Got It Wrong" (featuring Wiley) [Radio Edit] – 3:14
3. "They Got It Wrong" (featuring Wiley) [Instrumental] – 3:12
4. "They Got It Wrong" (featuring Wiley) [A cappella] – 3:16

Digital download – remix

1. "They Got It Wrong" (featuring Krept and Konan, Kano, Squeeks and Wiley) [Remix] – 4:42

== Charts ==
Chart (2013)	Peak position
UK Indie (Official Charts)	9
UK Singles (Official Charts Company)	74

== Release history ==
Country	Date	Format	Label
United Kingdom	21 April 2013	Digital download	Stay Dench
