= Against All Odds (video game) =

2005 video game

- Against All Odds entrance screen
- Developer(s): UNHCR
- Platform(s): Adobe Flash
- Release: ^{fr} September 22, 2008; ^{da es} June 20, 2008; ^{fi} January 25, 2008; ^{en} November 7, 2007; ^{el} June 20, 2006; ^{de} March 6, 2006; ^{nb} December 7, 2005; ^{sv} May 10, 2005
- Genre(s): Educational

Against All Odds is an Adobe Flash video game developed by UNHCR designed to teach players about the plight of refugees. Originally released in Swedish in 2005, the game has been translated into several languages, the English edition of which was released in November 2007.

Initial funding for the project came from a grant of 1 million Norwegian krones from Statoil to UNHCR's Baltic and Nordic regional office, with the aim of developing a project to reach young people and promote integration in the region. UNHCR sought advice from Umeå University regarding interactive media for schools, and discussed ideas with the Norwegian Directorate for Education and Training and the Swedish Integration Board.

UNHCR decided to proceed the project as a web-based game, a medium which could reach a large number of young people, require no distribution costs and minimal marketing costs. The game was aimed at 12–15-year-olds, an age where people began to develop ideas regarding refugees and similar issues.

In Against All Odds, the player takes the role of a refugee and plays through twelve stages – depicting his persecution and flight from his native country, through to eventual integration into a foreign country as an asylum seeker. Complementing the game is a facts repository detailing the history of asylum and refugee testimonies. A teacher's guide section provides discussion points and lesson ideas for the classroom. The game takes approximately 45 minutes to play through, coinciding with the typical length of a lesson.

Reception has been positive, prompting translations into multiple languages from its original Swedish. In 2006, the German edition of the game, LastExitFlucht was awarded the Austrian State Prize for Multimedia and e-Business in the Knowledge and Learning category. The jury praised the game for building understanding, empathy and concern for the plight of refugees in the player.
