= Rari WorkOut =

Single by Lethal Bizzle featuring Jme and Tempa T
- Released: 31 August 2014
- Genre: Grime
- Length: 3:26
- Label: Stay Dench Records
- Songwriter(s): Maxwell Ansah, Raoul Chen, Jamie Adenuga, Nicholas Dei

Lethal Bizzle singles chronology
"The Drop" (2014)	"Rari WorkOut" (2014)	"Flutes" (2014)

Jme singles chronology
"That's Not Me" (2014)	"Rari WorkOut" (2014)	"Man Don't Care" (2015)

Tempa T singles chronology
"Hypest Hype" (2010)	"Rari WorkOut" (2014)

"Rari WorkOut" is a single by English grime MC Lethal Bizzle, featuring vocals from Jme and Tempa T. It was released on 31 August 2014 for digital download in the United Kingdom. The song has peaked at number 11 on the UK Singles Chart.

== Track listing ==
Digital download – single
No.	Title	Length
1.	"Rari WorkOut" (featuring Jme and Tempa T)	3:26
2.	"Rari WorkOut" (featuring Jme and Tempa T) (Instrumental)	3:26

Digital download – remix
No.	Title	Length
1.	"Rari WorkOut" (featuring Jammer, Hyper and Face)	3:39

== Chart performance ==
=== Weekly charts ===
Chart (2014)	Peak position
Scotland (OCC)	24
UK Singles (OCC)	11
UK Indie (OCC)	1
UK Hip Hop/R&B (OCC)	2

== Certifications ==
Region	Certification	Certified units/sales
United Kingdom (BPI)	Silver	200,000^{‡}
^{‡} Sales+streaming figures based on certification alone.

== Release history ==
Country	Date	Format	Label
United Kingdom	31 August 2014	Digital download	Stay Dench Records
