= Fester Skank =

Single by Lethal Bizzle featuring Diztortion
- Released: 10 April 2015
- Genre: Moombahton
- Length: 2:25
- Label: Virgin EMI, Universal
- Songwriter(s): Maxwell Ansah, Raoul Chen
- Producer(s): Diztortion

Lethal Bizzle singles chronology
"Flutes" (2014)	"Fester Skank" (2015)	"Dude" (2015)

Diztortion singles chronology
"Fester Skank" (2015)	"Redemption" (2015)

"Fester Skank" is a single by the English grime rapper Lethal Bizzle, featuring the Dutch electronic producer Diztortion. It was released on 12 April 2015 for digital download in the United Kingdom and was his first single to be released after signing to Virgin EMI Records. The song peaked at number 11 on the UK Singles Chart.

A remix is available featuring Stormzy, Chip, Fuse ODG and Wretch 32.

The girl group Little Mix included this song in a medley in the British arena gigs of their worldwide Get Weird Tour which sold 300,000 tickets. Lethal Bizzle joined Little Mix in the performance at the Wembley Arena, but the song was not included in Little Mix's medley in non-UK gigs. Lethal Bizzle and Little Mix later duetted the song at the V Festival on 21 August 2016.

== Background and composition ==
The title of "Fester Skank" was decided after Diztortion recorded a video of Lethal Bizzle dancing to the instrumental during a studio session, which was then posted to Instagram; a fan commented that Lethal Bizzle's dancing reminded them of Uncle Fester of the fictional Addams Family. After reading positive fan feedback to the video, the two decided to develop the instrumental into a full song, with the lyrics written in a "half hour" according to Lethal Bizzle. The song was completed a year before its eventual release.

The instrumental contains elements of bashment, dance, hip-hop and reggae, with Lethal Bizzle describing it as a "weird... fusion" of Diztortion's favourite sounds.

== Track listings ==
Digital download – single
No.	Title	Length
1.	"Fester Skank" (featuring Diztortion)	2:25

Digital download – EP
No.	Title	Length
1.	"Fester Skank" (featuring Diztortion) (Preditah Remix)	3:28
2.	"Fester Skank" (featuring Diztortion) (Don Diablo Remix)	4:07
3.	"Fester Skank" (featuring Diztortion) (Zdot and Krunchie Remix)	2:26

Digital download – acoustic version
No.	Title	Length
1.	"Fester Skank" (Acoustic Version) (featuring Amanda Mellid)	2:41

== Charts ==
Chart (2015)	Peak position
Scotland (OCC)	19
UK Hip Hop/R&B (OCC)	2
UK Singles (OCC)	11

== Certifications ==
Region	Certification	Certified units/sales
United Kingdom (BPI)	Platinum	600,000^{‡}
^{‡} Sales+streaming figures based on certification alone.

== Release history ==
Country	Date	Format	Label
Ireland	10 April 2015	Digital download	Universal Records
United Kingdom	10 April 2015	Digital download	Universal Records
