= Donae'o =

British rapper

- Born: Ian Greenidge
- Genres: UK funky, grime, R&B
- Occupations: Rapper, singer, songwriter
- Instrument: Vocals
- Years active: 1999–present
- Labels: My-ish Music, Island, Movin Anti

Ian Greenidge, better known by his stage name Donae'o (/doʊ.ˈneɪ.oʊ/ doh-NAY-oh; meaning Gift from God), is a British singer, songwriter and rapper from North-West London. He has worked with numerous British musicians throughout his career including The Streets, Giggs, Lethal Bizzle, Dizzee Rascal, Jme, and Calvin Harris.

== Career ==
The single "I'm Fly", released by Donae'o in 2009, reached No. 129 on the UK Singles Chart. His studio album Party Hard was released the same year.

In 2016, Donae'o produced and featured on Giggs' single "Lock Doh". It peaked at number 52 on the UK Singles Chart, number 5 on the UK Independent Chart and number 12 on the UK R&B Chart, becoming Giggs' highest charting single. In April 2017, the single was certified Gold by BPI Music with 400,000 sales.

In 2017, Donae'o released his mixtape, Sixteen, which featured cuts with Fredo, Young T & Bugsey, Ghetts, Wretch 32 and the late Cadet.

In 2019, Donae'o launching his record label Movin Anti, a joint-venture with Island Records.

== Personal life ==
Donae'o is of Ghanaian and Guyanese descent.

== Discography ==
=== Studio albums ===
Year	Album details
2009	Party Hard: Released: June 2009; Label: My-ish Music; Formats: CD, digital download
2011	Indigo Child: Released: June 2011; Label: Zephron Entertainment; Formats: CD, digital download
2014	The Forest of Zephron: Released: 21 May 2014; Label: Zephron Entertainment; Formats: CD, digital download
2017	Sixteen: Released: 30 June 2017; Label: Island Records; Formats: CD, digital download, Streaming
2025	Spectrum: Released: 15 August 2025; Label: Zephron Entertainment; Formats: CD, digital download, Streaming

=== Singles ===
==== As lead artist ====
List of singles as lead artist, with selected chart positions, showing year released and album name
Title	Year	Peak chart positions			Album
Title	Year	UK	UK Dance	UK Ind.	Album
"Falling"	1999	—	—	—	Non-album singles
"Don't Do It"	2003	—	—	—	Non-album singles
"My Philosophy (Bounce)"	2003	—	—	—	Non-album singles
"Mic da Mic"	2004	—	—	—	Non-album singles
"United"	2005	—	—	—	Non-album singles
"Change" (with Wiley)	2006	—	—	—	Non-album singles
"Next Customer" / "London Boy"	2007	—	—	—	Non-album singles
"When Your Alone" / "Devil in a Blue Dress"	2008	—	—	—	Party Hard
"I" / "African Warrior"	2008	—	—	—	Party Hard
"Watching Her Move" / "Party Hard"	2009	—	—	—	Party Hard
"I'm Fly"	2009	129	21	12	Non-album singles
"Check My Swagga Out"	2011	—	—	—	Non-album singles
"Mami No Like"	2016	—	—	—	Non-album singles
"Chalice" (featuring Belly)	2018	—	—	—	Non-album singles
"Braveheart" (featuring Kranium)	2022	—	—	—	Non-album singles
"Nights Like This" (featuring Omar, Lemar and House Gospel Choir)	2025	—	—	—	Spectrum
"—" denotes a recording that did not chart or was not released in that territory.

=== Other releases/songs ===
Year	Single	Peak chart positions	Album
Year	Single	UK	Album
2007	"Step Back" (Rekless feat. Donae'o, Sharkey P and Scandal)	—	
2009	"Go Hard" (Lethal Bizzle feat. Donae'o)	79	Go Hard
2010	"Speechless" (Breakage feat. Donae'o) / "Justified" (Breakage feat. Erin)	—	Foundation
2011	"Raver" (Shy FX feat. Donae'o)	–	
2011	"Out of Control" (The Mike Delinquent Project feat. Kcat and Donae'o)	—	
2012	"Not a Saint" (Lethal Bizzle feat. Donae'o)	—	
2012	"You Should Know" (Jack Beats feat. Donae'o)	—	
2012	"Not a Saint" (Vato Gonzalez vs. Lethal Bizzle and Donae'o)	20	
2012	"Flying to Mars" (Foreign Beggars feat. Donae'o)	—	The Uprising
2013	"I'm in Love" (Sean McCabe feat. Donae'o)	—	
2014	"Tomorrow's Another Day" (Artful feat. Donae'o)	—	
2015	"Fallen" (The Prototypes feat. Donae'o)	—	City of Gold
2017	"Bridge over Troubled Water" (as part of Artists for Grenfell)	1	Non-album single
2017	"Family" (Manga Saint Hilare feat. Donae'o)	—	

== Awards ==
- 2003 People's Choice Awards, Best Live P.A.: "Bounce"
- 2009 MOBO Awards, Best UK Act (nominated)
- 2026 MOBO Awards, Song of the Year (nominated)
