= Lethal Bizzle =

British rapper (born 1983)

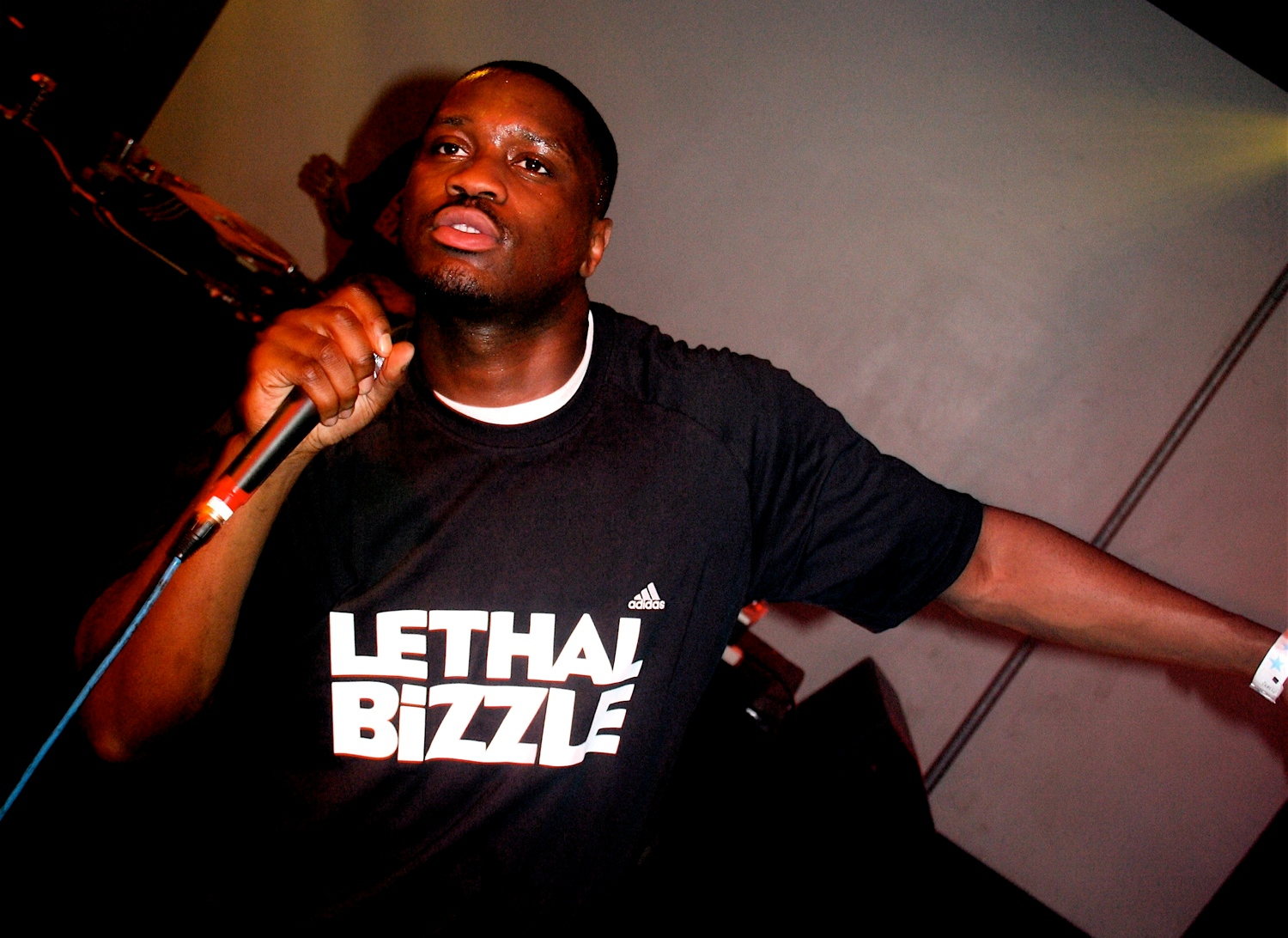
- Lethal Bizzle performing in 2007

Background information
- Also known as: Lethal B
- Born: Maxwell Owusu Ansah; 14 September 1984 (age 42); Walthamstow, London, England
- Genres: UK rap; grime; dance
- Occupation: Rapper
- Years active: 2000–present
- Labels: Relentless; V2; Search & Destroy; Dench; Virgin EMI
- Member of: Fire Camp; More Fire Crew
- Website: Lethal Bizzle on Twitter

Maxwell Owusu Ansah (born 14 September 1984), known professionally as Lethal Bizzle, is a British rapper from Walthamstow, London, of Ghanaian origin. He emerged in 2002 as a grime MC as part of More Fire Crew, with their grime single "Oi!" charting in the top 10 of the UK singles chart. His debut solo single "Pow! (Forward)" attracted attention for its aggressive content, charting at number 11 despite being banned from airplay and clubs. Although known notably for his single releases, Lethal Bizzle released his debut studio album, Against All Oddz, in 2005, followed by Back to Bizznizz in 2007.

Throughout his career Lethal Bizzle has experimented with blending mainstream chart genres such as dance music with grime, leading to numerous top 40 singles. He is known for his singles "Pow! (Forward)", "Rari WorkOut" and "Fester Skank", including other top 40 songs such as "The Drop", "Pow 2011" and "Party Right" – all of which have been non-album releases, besides "Pow 2011", which was included on his first compilation album Best of Bizzle (2011).

Outside of music, Bizzle is a social media personality through platforms Twitter and Snapchat, which have been used to promote his music independently. In 2012, he launched a clothing brand titled "Stay Dench" based on his popular British slang phrases.

== Music career ==
=== 2002–2005: More Fire Crew and "Pow! (Forward)" ===
In 2000, Lethal Bizzle formed the grime collective More Fire Crew, consisting of himself, Neeko and Ozzie B as MCs. Their debut single, "Oi!", was released in 2002 and charted at number 7 on the UK Singles Chart. It was one of the first grime songs to chart in the top 10 and remains one of the most highest-charting grime singles to be released. Their sole studio album, More Fire Crew C.V., was released the following year. Their follow-up single, "Back Then", peaked at number 45, while their third single "What's the Point?" did not chart. Soon after, the crew disbanded and Lethal Bizzle pursued a solo career. In early July 2005, Lethal Bizzle appeared on stage at the final Live 8 concert in Edinburgh.

In December 2004, he released the single "Pow! (Forward)", also known as "Forward Riddim" which was banned from airplay by some mainstream radio stations because it contained some lyrics about gun culture. It entered the UK Singles Chart at number 11 in its first week on the chart in 2005, and it reached number one on the UK Dance Chart. He won a MOBO for "Pow! (Forward)" as "Best Single", and was nominated at the same awards as "Best Newcomer".

Following the success of "Pow! (Forward)", Bizzle released the follow-up singles "Uh Oh (I'm Back)", "Fire" and "What We Do" with Kray Twinz, Twista and Gappy Ranks, the latter two which peaked at number 34 and number 23 respectively. Bizzle's debut album, Against All Oddz (2005), was released on 15 August 2005. The album peaked at number 89 on the UK Albums Chart

=== 2006–2009: Back to Bizznizz and Go Hard ===
In 2007, the single "Police on My Back" charted at number 37, and was included on Bizzle's second studio album, Back to Bizznizz (2007), released on 23 July 2007. The album peaked at number 86 on the UK Albums Chart.

After releasing no singles for two years, Lethal Bizzle returned with "Go Hard" featuring Donae'o, as the lead single off his third album Go Hard (2009). The album was released on 5 October 2009.

=== 2010–2012: "Pow 2011" and Best of Bizzle ===
It was announced by Lethal Bizzle on Twitter that he would be re-releasing "Pow!" on 13 December 2010, to try to get the Christmas number 1 in the UK Singles Chart, like many people were trying to do by using Facebook campaigns. On 18 November 2010, Lethal was interviewed by Grime Daily. Bizzle revealed: "The whole Pow 2011 thing started as a joke. I was on Twitter one day and I said 'You know what? Pow for Christmas number 1'. And bare people retweeted it and someone was like 'Bizz you should do an updated version to go with it.'" Lethal (saying to another source) said: "I felt the original was still relevant, 6 years on it's still one of the biggest club tunes, so it was kind of a no brainer. I was messing around on Twitter about doing a new POW and getting it to the top of the charts- and the reaction was so crazy I thought wow I actually have to make this happen..." Upon release, "Pow 2011" entered and peaked at number 33 on the UK Singles Chart, becoming Bizzle's fifth top 40 entry as a solo entry and sixth overall.

The single was included on Bizzle's first compilation album, Best of Bizzle (2011), which was released on 27 February 2011.

=== 2013–2016: Non-album chart success ===
From 2013, Lethal Bizzle began experimented with musical genres, particularly with dance, dubstep and house music. Bizzle released a string of non-album singles without releasing a full-length project. He released the single "Not a Saint" with Dutch DJ and producer Vato Gonzalez and frequent collaborator Donae'o, which peaked at number 20. This was followed by "Party Right" featuring Ruby Goe, which peaked in the top 30. The grime-dubstep song "They Got It Wrong" featuring Wiley peaked in the top 80, and was later remixed featuring Krept and Konan, Kano and Squeeks. In 2014, "The Drop" featuring Cherri Voncelle also peaked in the top 20.

In late 2014, the single "Rari WorkOut" featuring Jme and Tempa T received notable attention due to the popularity of Bizzle's Snapchat posts of working out in the gym. The single became tied with "Pow! (Forward)" as Bizzle's highest-charting single as a solo artist, peaking at number 11. In 2015, the popular dance-inspired single "Fester Skank" also charted at number 11, giving Bizzle three top 15 chart entries and three peaking at number 11.

The singles "Going to the Gym", considered a sequel to "Rari WorkOut", "Playground" featuring Shakka, "Dude" featuring Stormzy and "Box" featuring Jme and Face were also released, three of which entered the top 100.

=== 2017–present: Lennox Rd and You'll Never Make a Million from Grime EP ===
In late 2016, Lethal Bizzle announced he would be releasing his first album after eight years, following his third studio album Go Hard (2009). The album was revealed to be titled Lennox Rd in December 2016, following a teaser for the lead single off the album. The lead single, "Round Here" featuring Giggs and Flowdan was released on 10 January 2017.

In early April 2017, Bizzle abruptly preceded the release of Lennox Rd with the announcement of an EP titled You'll Never Make a Million from Grime, featuring a guest appearance from Skepta. The seven-track EP was released 5 May 2017, charting at number 79 on the UK Albums Chart. It became Bizzle's highest-charting album release. The second single released from the EP was "Hold You" featuring Mostack.

== Other ventures ==
=== Stay Dench ===
In 2011, Bizzle started a successful T-shirt business with his first cousin and footballer Emmanuel Frimpong, featuring his catchphrase "Dench". Since then he has been very successful branching out to his fans on Snapchat, that has led him to create the hit song "Rari Workout". In September 2017, the social media website LADBible posted a video of Bizzle rapping with actress Judi Dench whose support for Stay Dench is credited with raising the profile of the brand.

=== Television and film ===
Top Gear of the Pops was a one-off special programme that aired for BBC Two on 16 March 2007, as part of Red Nose Day 2007. The episode combined the elements of Top Gear, with that of BBC music chart show Top of the Pops.

Bizzle's performance was deliberately cut short by Jeremy Clarkson who, before commenting with expletives on the performance, literally pulled the plug on Bizzle, before labelling the performance as 'just noise' and referring to him as "Jizzy Tissue" throughout the rest of the show. https://www.youtube.com/watch?v=n_RTTH50HFU

In 2011, he had a cameo in the Adam Deacon film Anuvahood, knocking him out in the opening scene.

In 2012, Lethal Bizzle appeared in the BBC Three comedy drama, Bad Education in which he competed in a rap battle with the headmaster.

On 20 October 2013, Lethal B appeared on BBC's Match of the Day 2; after being hired to deliver a one-off report on the Arsenal Premier League match against Norwich City. On 17 April 2014, Bizzle made a guest appearance on ITV2's Celebrity Juice.

On 22 September 2014, Lethal Bizzle, along with DJ Semtex, DJ Target and A.Dot, took part in a special BBC iPlayer version of the classic quiz show Mastermind titled Hip Hop Mastermind, presented by host John Humphrys, which Semtex went on to win.

== Personal life ==
Ansah is the cousin of former football player Emmanuel Frimpong.

=== Controversies ===
In 2010, Lethal had a feud with N-Dubz over intellectual property rights citing emails of musical hooks he had sent Tulisa. N-Dubz members Tulisa and Dappy responded with foul-mouthed attacks.

== Discography ==
=== Studio albums ===
Title	Details	Peak chart positions
Title	Details	UK
Against All Oddz	Released: 1 July 2005; Label: V2; Formats: Digital download, CD	89
Back to Bizznizz	Released: 23 July 2007; Label: V2; Formats: Digital download, CD	86
Go Hard	Released: 5 October 2009; Label: Search & Destroy; Formats: Digital download, CD	—
"—" denotes an album that did not chart or was not released in that territory.

=== Extended plays ===
Title	Details	Peak chart positions
Title	Details	UK
You'll Never Make a Million from Grime	Released: 5 May 2017; Label: Dench Records; Formats: Streaming, digital download	79

=== Compilation albums ===
Title	Details
Best of Bizzle	Released: 27 February 2011; Label: Dench Records; Formats: Digital download, CD

=== Mixtapes ===
Title	Details
Da Bizzle Mixtape	Released: 18 April 2007; Label: Self-released; Formats: Digital download

=== Singles ===
==== As lead artist ====
Title	Year	Peak chart positions					Certifications	Album
Title	Year	UK	UK R&B	UK Ind.	UK DL	AUS	Certifications	Album
"Pow! (Forward)" (featuring Fumin, D Double E, Nappa, Jamakabi, Neeko, Flowdan, Ozzie B, Forcer & Demon)	2004	11	—	—	—	—		Non-album single
"Uh Oh (I'm Back)"	2005	47	9	—	—	—		Against All Oddz
"Fire"	2005	34	—	4	—	—		Against All Oddz
"What We Do" (with Kray Twinz, Twista & Gappy Ranks)	2005	23	3	—	—	—		Against All Oddz
"Mind Your Head" (limited edition 7" vinyl single)	2006	—	—	—	—	—		Against All Oddz
"Mr." (featuring Face)	2007	—	—	—	—	—		Back to Bizznizz
"Bizzle Bizzle" / "Babylon Burning the Ghetto"	2007	99	28	—	—	—		Back to Bizznizz
"Police on My Back"	2007	37	11	—	—	—		Back to Bizznizz
"Go Hard" (featuring Donae'o)	2009	79	23	—	—	—		Go Hard
"Going Out Tonight"	2009	—	—	—	—	—		Go Hard
"Go Go Go!" (featuring Luciana)	2010	—	—	—	—	67		Best of Bizzle
"Pow 2011" (featuring Jme, Wiley, Chipmunk, 2Face, P Money, Ghetts and Kano)	2011	33	10	4	37	—	BPI: Silver	Best of Bizzle
"Mind Spinning"	2011	73	21	10	—	—		Non-album singles
"Look Up to the Sky" (featuring Jamal Hadaway)	2011	—	31	—	—	—		Non-album singles
"Leave It Yeah" (featuring Jme & Fire Camp)	2011	98	40	—	—	—		Non-album singles
"Not a Saint" (Vato Gonzalez vs. Lethal Bizzle & Donae'o)	2013	20	—	1	—	—		Non-album singles
"They Got It Wrong" (featuring Wiley)	2013	74	—	9	—	—		Non-album singles
"Party Right" (featuring Ruby Goe)	2013	29	5	7	—	—		Non-album singles
"The Drop" (featuring Cherri Voncelle)	2014	20	3	3	—	—		Non-album singles
"Rari WorkOut" (featuring Jme & Tempa T)	2014	11	2	1	—	—	BPI: Silver	Non-album singles
"Fester Skank" (featuring Diztortion)	2015	11	2	—	—	—	BPI: Platinum	Non-album singles
"Playground" (featuring Shakka)	2015	79	19	—	—	—		Non-album singles
"Dude" (with Stormzy)	2015	49	7	7	—	—		Non-album singles
"Going to the Gym"	2015	—	21	19	—	—		Non-album singles
"Box" (featuring JME and Face)	2016	—	—	—	—	—		Non-album singles
"Wobble"	2016	98	26	—	—	—		Non-album singles
"Round Here" (featuring Giggs)	2017	—	—	—	—	—		Lennox Rd
"I Win" (featuring Skepta)	2017	—	—	—	—	—		You'll Never Make a Million from Grime
"Hold You" (featuring Mostack)	2017	—	—	—	—	—		You'll Never Make a Million from Grime
"—" denotes a single that did not chart or was not released in that territory.

==== As featured artist ====
Title	Year	Peak chart positions	Album
Title	Year	UK	Album
"Staring at the Rude Bois" (Gallows Featuring Lethal Bizzle)	2006	31	Orchestra of Wolves
"Maybe Ting Refix" (Ozzie B featuring Lip E, Double S, Shocka, Flirta D, Lethal Bizzle, JME and Frisco)	2010	182	Non-album singles
"Flutes" (New World Sound & Thomas Newson featuring Lethal Bizzle)	2014	67	Non-album singles
"Man's Not Hot (MC Mix)" (Big Shaq featuring Lethal Bizzle, Chip, Krept & Konan and Jme)	2017	—	Non-album singles

=== Other songs ===
Title	Year	Album
"Leave It Yeah (Remix)" (featuring Emmanuel Frimpong, JME, Scrufizzer, 2Face, Frisco & Flowdan)	2012	Non-album singles
"Not a Saint" (featuring Donae'o)	2012	Non-album singles
