= Gerald Walker discography =

- Studio albums: 3
- Singles: 3
- Music videos: 2
- Mixtapes: 1

The discography of Gerald Walker, an American hip hop rapper, and performer, consists of three studio albums and four mixtapes. Gerald Walker made his official debut with the acclaimed, Evening Out With Your Girlfriend, which was released in September 2009 through One Step at a Time Music.

== Discography ==
=== Singles ===
- 2006: The Future (Produced by Slot-A)
- 2006: Stop Arguing (Produced by Kev Brown)
- 2007: Shout It Out featuring Symbolyc One
- 2010: Silent

=== Albums and mixtapes ===
- 2006: The Gerald Walker Sampler Disc
- 2007: The Stop Arguing EP
- 2008: Until The Last Moment EP
- 2009: Gerald Walker's Evening Out With Your Girlfriend... (Mixtape)
- 2010: I Remember When This All Meant Something... (Mixtape)
- 2010: A Gerald Walker Christmas EP
- 2011: On Your Side (With Taylor Gang producer, Cardo)
- 2011: The Other Half of Letting Go
- 2011: It's Christmastime Again, Gerald Walker
- 2012: Believers Never Die

=== Guest appearances ===
- 2009: "Ho*s Got Feelings" Add-2 featuring Gerald Walker & Slot-A
- 2010: "Brand New" Woody featuring Gerald Walker & Nero
- 2016: "4AM" B-Nasty featuring Gerald Walker

=== Appearances ===
- 2008: Practice Makes Perfect (Remix) (Cute Is What We Aim For feat. Gerald Walker)
- 2008: Let The Flames Begin (Remix) (Paramore feat. Gerald Walker)
- 2008: To Bob Ross With Love (Remix) (Gym Class Heroes feat. Gerald Walker)
- 2008: To Bob Ross With Love (Remix) (Gym Class Heroes feat. Gerald Walker)
- 2009: Nothing But A Hero (Remix) (Tabbi Bonney feat. Gerald Walker)
- 2009: Roxanne (Remix) (The Knux feat. Gerald Walker)
- 2009: Everywhere (Remix) (Common feat. Martina Topley-Bird & Gerald Walker)
- 2009: Fuck You (Remix) (Lily Allen feat. Gerald Walker)
- 2009: Ring-A-Ling (Remix) (The Black Eyed Peas feat. Gerald Walker)
- 2011: All Around The World Talent Couture feat. Gerald Walker)
- 2011: The Struggle Streetz 'N' Young Deuces feat. Gerald Walker)

== Magazines and features ==
- URB (March 2008)
- Stuck Magazine (2007)
- Feed Me Cool Shit Magazine (2006)
