= Seen It All =

Seen It All may refer to:

== Songs ==
- "Seen It All" (Jake Bugg song), from the 2013 album Jake Bugg by Jake Bugg
- "Seen It All" (Jeezy song), from the 2014 album of the same name by Jeezy
- "Seen It All", a song by Korn from See You on the Other Side
- "Seen It All", a song by Future and Metro Boomin from their 2024 album, We Don't Trust You

== Albums ==
- Seen It All: The Autobiography by Young Jeezy, 2014
- Seen It All, a 2018 EP by Shea Diamond

== See also ==
- "I've Seen It All", a song by Björk from the album Selmasongs.
