= Papi chulo =

Papi chulo ("cute daddy" in Caribbean Spanish) is a Spanish term of endearment for males.

Papi chulo may also refer to:

- "Papi Chulo", 1997 song by Funkdoobiest
- "Papi chulo... (te traigo el mmmm...)", 2003 song by Lorna
- Papi Chulo (film), 2018 American-Irish comedy-drama film
- "Papi Chulo" (Octavian and Skepta song), 2020 rap song
- the TNA stage name of Mexican wrestler Mr. Águila
