= The Other Half of Letting Go =

The Other Half of Letting Go...

Mixtape by Gerald Walker
- Released: September 20, 2011
- Genre: Hip hop
- Label: One Step at a Time Music Recordings

Gerald Walker chronology
On Your Side (mixtape) (2011)	The Other Half of Letting Go... (2011)	It's Christmastime Again, Gerald Walker (2011)

Singles from The Other Half of Letting Go...
- 1. "The Missing Piece" Released: May 15, 2011; 2. "Shackles" Released: June 8, 2011; 3. "It's All Real" Released: September 16, 2011

The Other Half of Letting Go... is the fourth official mixtape from Milwaukee, Wisconsin rapper Gerald Walker. The mixtape was released on September 20, 2011, through One Step at a Time Music. The mixtape is named after American painter Esao Andrews' piece also titled "The Other Half of Letting Go." The mixtape's lead single, "The Missing Piece" is produced by Chemist. The second single, "Shackles" was produced by J.LBS. The mixtape was originally scheduled to be released by Grand Hustle Records, however Walker announced his intention to self-publish: "No Grand Hustle, we're gonna do this ourselves." with a September 20 release date.

== Background ==
Gerald Walker said he began working on the mixtape immediately after I Remember When This All Meant Something...[.] However, he halted production while working on his collaborative debut effort, On Your Side, with Taylor Gang producer, Cardo. The mixtape serves as Walker's second release in 2011.

== Track listing ==
No.	Title	Producer	Length
1.	"Entrance"	Hans Zimmer	0:49
2.	"It's All Real"	Cardo	5:15
3.	"It's Not a Coincidence" (featuring Bryant Stewart)	The Rothschilds	3:39
4.	"Please, Shut The F*ck Up!"	Bravestarr	4:18
5.	"Shackles"	J.LBS	2:50
6.	"The Missing Piece"	Chemist	4:17
7.	"The Things We Think and Do Not Say..."	B.Keith & Izzy The Kidd	2:44
8.	"Recluse"	RMB Justize	3:43
9.	"What's So Different"	Timbaland	3:56
10.	"Ran That Scam"	Bravestarr	3:26
11.	"Living Well Is The Best Revenge"	Kuddie Fresh	4:05
12.	"Take This To Your Heart"	Kuddie Fresh	4:31
13.	"What Made Milwaukee Famous..."	Sledgren	3:57

== Singles ==
The mixtape's first single was "The Missing Piece." A music video was shot and released through One Step at a Time's official website on August 18, 2011. The video was filmed, directed and edited by Xavier Ruffin. The second single "Shackles" was released on June 8, 2011 via BlogOrDiePGH.com via Twitter.

== Song notes ==
- A typical Gerald Walker release which feature his now signature ellipsis mark indicate's that it was inspired from another source.
- The song titled "The Things We Think and Do Not Say..." is inspired by the 1995 feature film Jerry Maguire. In the movie Maguire distributes copies of his mission statement, entitled "The Things We Think and Do Not Say: The Future of Our Business".
- Gerald Walker's song "Take This To Your Heart..." is inspired by American rock band Mayday Parade's song of the same title, "Take This To Your Heart" from their debut album "A Lesson in Romantics.
- Walker tweeted "It's All Real" was dedicated to one of his favorite rappers, Krayzie Bone.The song contains interpolation of "It's All Real" by Bone Thugs N Harmony from their album "The Art of War."
- "The Missing Piece..." was originally released as a demo and not slated for the recording, however, due to popularity it was later re-recorded and released as the lead single.
- "The Missing Piece..." was inspired by Shel Silverstein's popular 1976 picture book, The Missing Piece.
- The song titled "Living Well Is The Best Form of Revenge" is inspired by pop punk band, Midtown's, sophomore album "Living Well Is the Best Revenge.
- The song "Ran That Scam" was inspired by San Francisco punk rock band Dead to Me's song "Ran That Scam" and features the same lyrics during the chorus: "I must've ran this scam a million times."
- It is believed that "What Made Milwaukee Famous…" is taken from the Milwaukee-based brewing company, Shlitz's, slogan "The Beer That Made Milwaukee Famous"
