= Ignorance Is Bliss (Skepta album) =

Studio album by Skepta
- Released: 31 May 2019
- Genres: Grime; British hip-hop
- Length: 41:33
- Label: Boy Better Know
- Producers: Skepta; Ragz Originale; Ayo; IndigoChildRick; Trench

Skepta chronology
Vicious (2017)	Ignorance Is Bliss (2019)	Insomnia (2020)

Singles from Ignorance Is Bliss
- 1. "Pure Water" Released: 8 May 2018; 2. "Bullet from a Gun" Released: 9 May 2019; 3. "Greaze Mode" Released: 9 May 2019; 4. "Love Me Not" Released: 29 July 2019

Ignorance Is Bliss is the fifth studio album by British rapper Skepta. It was released on 31 May 2019 through Boy Better Know, and is the follow-up to his 2016 album Konnichiwa. The album features appearances from Nafe Smallz, Key!, J Hus, Cheb Rabi, B Live, Lancey Foux, Lay-Z, Wizkid and Boy Better Know.

Upon release, Ignorance Is Bliss was met with positive reviews and debuted at number two on the UK Albums Chart. The album was supported by the singles "Bullet from a Gun" and "Greaze Mode" with Nafe Smallz.

== Background ==
In 2018, Skepta announced his next album would be titled SkLevel, but said in April 2019 that the title had been changed because "#SkLEVEL is a 2018 pattern. New year, new name."

== Promotion ==
On 28 April 2019, Skepta announced the release via his social media, sharing the release date and cover art, which NME described as a "grid of nine thermal camera images". On 9 May 2019, Skepta released the single "Bullet from a Gun" for streaming and digital download. Later that day, Skepta released the second single "Greaze Mode" with Nafe Smallz.

In addition to releasing music videos for both "Bullet From A Gun" and "Greaze Mode", Skepta collaborated with YouTube channel Colors to release visuals for "No Sleep". On 28 July 2019, Skepta released the music video for "Love Me Not", which alongside appearances from both Cheb Rabi and B Live, features cameo appearances from Octavian, Frisco, Chip, Jammer, Slowthai, Lancey Foux, Michael Phantom, and Heartless Crew.

== Critical reception ==
Professional ratings
Aggregate scores
Source	Rating
Metacritic	78/100
Review scores
Source	Rating
Clash	8/10
Exclaim!	6/10
The Guardian	4/5 stars
The Independent	4/5 stars
NME	4/5 stars
Pitchfork	6.4/10

Upon release, Ignorance Is Bliss was met with positive reviews. At Metacritic, which assigns a normalised rating out of 100 to reviews from mainstream publications, the album received an average score of 78, based on 13 reviews, indicating "generally favourable reviews". Ben Beaumount-Thomas of The Guardian complimented the album's production, lyricism and Skepta's delivery: "Throughout it all is Skepta's flow, honed by years spent in clashes, raves and booths into a formidable instrument. At times you can detect just a trace of Giggs' style of emphatic punchlines, but the chief pleasure of this album is how much it allows Skepta to be Skepta: an MC who always looks, waits, then darts between the traffic of his beats. This sensual pleasure goes beyond lyrics and into pure music, and should sustain his career long past his recent triumphant homecoming."

Ian McQuaid of The Independent described Ignorance Is Bliss as "a quintessentially London record, as dark and moody as it is brash and innovative", adding that Skepta "might just have invented a new genre." For NME, Jordan Bassett wrote that the album is "a diverse-sounding, assured success, a muscular record that conveys global ambition, drawing on a dizzying collection of sounds and influences", noting the "colourful, kaleidoscopic and loose" approach in contrast to Skepta's previous studio album, Konnichiwa.

In a mixed review, Will Pritchard of Pitchfork concluded that "as Skepta tussles to find his place in the world, you're left wondering whether he craves the bliss of youthful innocence or the responsibility of being a voice for a generation. Unfortunately, Ignorance Is Bliss is a deferral, splitting the difference with a series of half-measures."

=== Accolades ===
Publication	Accolade	Rank	Ref.
Complex	Top 50 Albums of 2019 (Mid-Year)	26	
Stereogum	Top 50 Albums of 2019 (Mid-Year)	47	

== Track listing ==
Credits adapted from ASCAP.

No.	Title	Writer(s)	Producer(s)	Length
1.	"Bullet from a Gun"	Joseph Adenuga; Daniel Mukungu	Skepta; Ragz Originale	2:51
2.	"Greaze Mode" (featuring Nafe Smallz)	Adenuga; Nathan Adams; Clayton Gavin; Andrew Mair; Vonkeli Williams	Skepta	2:48
3.	"Redrum" (featuring Key!)	Adenuga; Marquis Whittaker	Skepta	3:55
4.	"No Sleep"	Adenuga	Skepta	3:11
5.	"What Do You Mean?" (featuring J Hus)	Adenuga; Momodou Jallow; Ayodele Oyadare	Skepta; iO	3:31
6.	"Going Through It"	Adenuga; Stewart Mullings	Skepta; IndigoChildRick	3:14
7.	"Same Old Story"	Adenuga	Skepta	3:20
8.	"Love Me Not" (featuring Cheb Rabi and B Live)	Adenuga; Rabiullah Sikander; James Barbe; Sophie Ellis-Bextor; Gregg Alexander	Skepta	3:23
9.	"Animal Instinct" (featuring Lancey Foux)	Adenuga; Lancey Foux	Skepta; Trench	3:09
10.	"Glow in the Dark" (featuring Lay-Z and Wizkid)	Adenuga; Daniel Mukungu; Ayodeji Balogun	Ragz Originale	2:55
11.	"You Wish"	Adenuga	Skepta	2:46
12.	"Gangsta" (featuring Boy Better Know)	Joseph Adenuga; Jamie Adenuga; Francis Cornwall; Aaron Lawrence; Jahmek Power	Skepta	3:19
13.	"Pure Water"	Adenuga	Skepta	3:11
Total length:				41:33

Sample credits

- "Love Me Not" contains samples of "Murder on the Dancefloor" written by Gregg Alexander and Sophie Ellis-Bextor and performed by Sophie Ellis-Bextor.

== Charts ==
Chart (2019)	Peak position
Australian Albums (ARIA)	15
Austrian Albums (Ö3 Austria)	67
Belgian Albums (Ultratop Flanders)	17
Belgian Albums (Ultratop Wallonia)	185
Canadian Albums (Billboard)	67
Czech Albums (ČNS IFPI)	98
Danish Albums (Hitlisten)	21
Dutch Albums (Album Top 100)	14
French Albums (SNEP)	125
German Albums (Offizielle Top 100)	68
Irish Albums (IRMA)	6
Lithuanian Albums (AGATA)	13
New Zealand Albums (RMNZ)	23
Norwegian Albums (VG-lista)	38
Scottish Albums (Official Charts)	33
Swiss Albums (Schweizer Hitparade)	26
UK Albums (Official Charts)	2
UK R&B Albums (Official Charts)	1

== Certifications ==
Region	Certification	Certified units/sales
Denmark (IFPI Danmark)	Gold	10,000^{‡}
New Zealand (RMNZ)	Gold	7,500^{‡}
United Kingdom (BPI)	Gold	100,000^{‡}
^{‡} Sales+streaming figures based on certification alone.

== See also ==
- List of UK R&B Albums Chart number ones of 2019
