= Insomnia (Skepta, Chip and Young Adz album) =

2020 studio album by Skepta, Chip & Young Adz

Studio album by Skepta, Chip and Young Adz
- Released: 27 March 2020
- Genre: British hip-hop; trap
- Length: 35:28
- Label: SKC M29
- Producer: Adrian Francis; Sevaqk; Ayo B; Cardo; Curtis James; Da Beatfreakz; Fanatix; Jacques Toni; Mark Waxkirsh; Money Montage; Rxwntree; Skepta; SOS; Supreme & Styles

Skepta chronology
Ignorance Is Bliss (2019)	Insomnia (2020)

Chip chronology
Ten10 (2018)	Insomnia (2020)	Snakes & Ladders (2021)

Young Adz chronology
Street Trauma (2019)	Insomnia (2020)

Singles from Insomnia
- 1. "Waze" Released: 25 March 2020

Insomnia is a collaborative studio album by British rappers Skepta, Chip and Young Adz, released on 27 March 2020 by SKC M29. The album features a guest appearance by Dirtbike LB of D-Block Europe. It was promoted by the lead single, "Waze".

== Release and promotion ==
The album was announced by the three artists on 22 March 2020 via social media, alongside the option to pre-order.

A music video for the lead single "Waze" was released on 25 March 2020. A second music video for the track "Mains" was released on 1 April 2020.

== Commercial performance ==
"Insomnia" debuted at number three on the UK Albums chart. The entry marked Skepta's third Top 10 album, Chip's third Top 10 album, and the first for Young Adz as a solo artist — he has three previous top 10 albums as a member of D-Block Europe.

== Critical reception ==
Professional ratings
Aggregate scores
Source	Rating
Metacritic	82/100
Review scores
Source	Rating
Clash	8/10
The Guardian	4/5 stars
Loud and Quiet	8/10
NME	4/5 stars
The Observer	4/5 stars

According to the review aggregator Metacritic, Insomnia received "universal acclaim" based on a weighted average score of 82 out of 100 from 6 critic scores.

Aimee Cliff of The Guardian wrote that Insomnia "feels calibrated for the current, strange cultural moment: it's immediately available, rides low at a tempo that's perfect for listening to while on lockdown in your house or car, and, with the title Insomnia, tackles paranoid themes with the light relief of dark humour". Kyann-Sian Williams of NME concluded that "Overall, though, despite a couple of subpar verses, Insomnia is one for the books. The UK rap world has never seen three of the scene's most in-demand rappers surprisingly team up for an album. Here the best of north and south London have come together and paved the way for others to follow suit". Joe Hale of Clash complimented the album's production and the chemistry between the three artists: "The three work well as a collective: Chip provides the cut-throat and fresh bars, Adz comes with the melody and Skepta is free to experiment throughout. The beats stand up too, consonantly switching patterns and breaks and bringing the best out of each artist".

== Track listing ==
Insomia track listing
No.	Title	Writer(s)	Producer(s)	Length
1.	"Mains"	Joseph Adenuga; Jahmaal Fyffe; Adam Williams	Skepta	3:50
2.	"Golden Brown"	Adenuga; Fyffe; Williams	Adrian Francis; Curtis James; Fanatix; Mark Waxkirsh	4:11
3.	"Waze"	Adenuga; Fyffe; Williams	Cardo	3:17
4.	"Demons" (featuring Dirtbike LB)	Adenuga; Fyffe; Williams; Ricky Banton	Supreme & Styles	2:48
5.	"St Tropez"	Adenuga; Fyffe; Williams	Skepta	2:43
6.	"Insomnia Interlude"	Adenuga; Fyffe; Williams; Britney De Villiers; D. Echeazu	Da Beatfreakz	2:31
7.	"Star in the Hood"	Adenuga; Fyffe	Da Beatfreakz	2:38
8.	"Mic Check"	Adenuga; Fyffe; Williams; Vania Khaleh-Pari	Rxwntree	2:46
9.	"Traumatised"	Adenuga; Fyffe; Williams	Sevaqk	2:45
10.	"Sin City"	Adenuga; Fyffe; Williams	SOS	2:57
11.	"High Road"	Adenuga; Fyffe; Williams; M.O. Thompson	SOS	3:51
12.	"Intro"	Adenuga; Fyffe; Williams	Ayo B; Money Montage; Jacques Toni	1:10
Total length:				35:28

Notes

- "Insomnia Interlude" features additional vocals by Litty Brity and Greatness Dex.
- "High Road" features additional vocals by M.O. Thompson.

Sample credits

- "St Tropez" contains samples of "Paper Planes", written by Maya Arulpragasam, Wesley Pentz, Topper Headon, Mick Jones, Paul Simonon and Joe Strummer, and performed by M.I.A.

== Charts ==
Chart performance for Insomnia
Chart (2020)	Peak position
Belgian Albums (Ultratop Flanders)	84
Dutch Albums (Album Top 100)	88
Irish Albums (Official Charts)	19
Swiss Albums (Schweizer Hitparade)	81
UK Albums (Official Charts)	3

== Certifications ==
Region	Certification	Certified units/sales
United Kingdom (BPI)	Silver	60,000^{‡}
^{‡} Sales+streaming figures based on certification alone.

== Release history ==
Release formats for Insomnia
Region	Date	Format	Label
United Kingdom	23 March 2020	CD, digital download	SKC M29
