= Greaze Mode =

2019 single by Skepta featuring Nafe Smallz

Single by Skepta featuring Nafe Smallz

from the album Ignorance Is Bliss
- Released: 9 May 2019
- Length: 2:48
- Label: Boy Better Know
- Songwriters: Joseph Adenuga; Nathan Adams; Clayton Gavin; Andrew Mair; Vonkeli Williams
- Producer: Skepta

Skepta singles chronology
"Bullet from a Gun" (2019)	"Greaze Mode" (2019)	"Back to Basics" (2019)

Nafe Smallz singles chronology
"Good Love" (2019)	"Greaze Mode" (2019)	"Thumb" (2019)

"Greaze Mode" is a song performed by British rapper Skepta featuring fellow British rapper Nafe Smallz. It was released as the third single from Skepta's fifth studio album Ignorance Is Bliss on 9 May 2019 through Boy Better Know. The song peaked at number 18 on the UK Singles Chart.

The lyrics refers to Nigerian delicacies palm wine and peppersoup.

== Music video ==
A music video to accompany the release of "Greaze Mode" was first released onto YouTube on 30 May 2019.

== Charts ==
Chart (2019)	Peak position
Ireland (IRMA)	41
New Zealand Hot Singles (RMNZ)	23
UK Singles (OCC)	18
UK Hip Hop/R&B (OCC)	5

== Certifications ==
Region	Certification	Certified units/sales
Australia (ARIA)	Gold	35,000^{‡}
New Zealand (RMNZ)	Gold	15,000^{‡}
United Kingdom (BPI)	Platinum	600,000^{‡}
^{‡} Sales+streaming figures based on certification alone.

== Release history ==
Region	Date	Format	Label
United Kingdom	9 May 2019	Digital download; streaming	Boy Better Know
