= Octavian (rapper) =

French-British rapper

- Also known as: Spaceman, King Essie, O Lil Angel
- Born: Octavian Oliver Godji; 22 January 1996 (age 30); Lille, France
- Origin: Brockley, London, England
- Genres: Hip hop; trap
- Occupations: Rapper; singer; songwriter
- Instrument: Vocals
- Years active: 2016–present

Octavian Oliver Godji (born 22 January 1996), known mononymously as Octavian, is a French-British rapper, singer, and songwriter from London. In 2019 he won the BBC's Sound of Award, their top award for new artists. He has appeared on tracks produced by Diplo, Mura Masa, Take a Daytrip, JRick and A2. He has collaborated with Skepta, A$AP Ferg, Gorillaz, and many others.

== Early life ==
Octavian was born in Lille, France, to an Angolan and Ivorian family. After his father died, he moved to the UK with his mother at the age of three, settling in Camberwell, South London. As a teenager, he won a scholarship to the BRIT School, but dropped out after a year and a half.

== Music career ==
Octavian's first mixtape, 22, was released in 2016 under the name "Octavian OG", followed by the Essie World EP in 2017. His recognition increased in January 2018 after a video of Drake singing along to the track "Party Here" at a Golden Globes afterparty was posted on Instagram. The track was produced in collaboration with producer J Rick.

The Fader have described Octavian's sound as a mixture of house, rap, and drill, as well as noting that his sound was influenced by Drake and Bon Iver. Pitchfork have described the sound as mixing "R&B and dancehall with downbeat grime, peppy house, and UK hip-hop". Critics have disagreed about how to classify Octavian's style, with High Snobiety noting that he is "Too British to be labeled trap but too American to be classed as grime".

The Guardian described his 2018 mixtape Spaceman as "a spectacular medley of the past decade of UK subgenres – the raspy-voiced rapper amalgamates elements of drill, grime and house to create something dextrous and distinctive." Pitchfork described the release as "daring eclecticism".

In August 2018, Octavian signed with Sony / ATV Records. In January 2019, Octavian won the BBC Sound of 2019 award.

In June 2020, a single featuring Octavian from Gorillaz's seventh studio album, Song Machine, Season One: Strange Timez, titled "Friday 13th", was released.

In May 2022, a re-worked version of his debut album Alpha was released under his label Sex Club AM, featuring previously released singles "Chapter 1/Rari (featuring Future)" and '"Famous (with Gunna and Saint Jhn)", as well as new tracks with features from Skepta, Corbin, and Bobby Raps.

This was followed by the Mixtape "22" released June 2023, featuring singles "Special Again" and "Feel".

== Abuse allegation ==
In November 2020, Octavian's ex-partner alleged that she had suffered years of emotional and physical abuse from him during their relationship. He denied the allegations, however she later posted videos and text messages claiming to show the alleged abuse, and claimed that he attacked her with a hammer and threatened to kill her. She also said she was asked by his management to sign an NDA for £20,000 and called out their complicity. Octavian's management later stated that their business relationship ended, as did his PR agency. His label, Black Butter Records, went on to make a statement that they had dropped him and would not be releasing his album.

== Discography ==
=== Studio albums ===
Title	Details	Peak chart positions	
Title	Details	UK	UK R&B
Spaceman	Released: 10 September 2018; Label: Black Butter Limited; Format: Digital download	98	35
Alpha	Released: 6 May 2022; Label: Sex Am Club; Format: Digital download	—	—
"—" denotes a recording that did not chart or was not released in that territory.

=== Mixtapes ===
Title	Details	Peak chart positions	
Title	Details	UK	UK R&B
Endorphins	Released: 13 June 2019; Label: Black Butter Limited; Format: Digital download	—	—
22	Released: 22 June 2023; Label: Sex AM Club; Format: Digital download	—	—
"—" denotes a recording that did not chart or was not released in that territory.

=== Extended plays ===
Title	Details
Essie World	Released: 22 March 2017; Label: Black Butter Limited; Format: Digital download

=== Singles ===
Title	Year	Peak chart positions		Album
Title	Year	UK	AUS	Album
"Party Here"	2017	—	—	Non-album singles
"100 Degrees" (featuring Sam Wise)	2018	—	—	Non-album singles
"Hands"	2018	—	—	Non-album singles
"Little"	2018	—	—	Non-album singles
"Move Me" (with Mura Masa)	2018	—	—	Non-album singles
"Revenge"	2018	—	—	Spaceman
"Stressed" (with Take a Daytrip)	2019	—	—	Non-album single
"Bet" (featuring Skepta and Michael Phantom)	2019	44	—	Endorphins
"Lit" (featuring ASAP Ferg)	2019	—	—	Endorphins
"Feel It" (featuring Theophilus London)	2019	—	—	Endorphins
"Papi Chulo" (with Skepta)	2020	37	85	Non-album single
"Poison" (featuring Take a Daytrip, Obongjayar and Santi)	2020	—	—	Non-album single
"Rari" (featuring Future)	2020	73	—	Alpha
"Famous" (with Gunna and Saint Jhn)	2020	—	—	Alpha
"Sky High"	2021	—	—	Non-album single
"Lotion Boy" (featuring Michael Phantom)	2022	—	—	Alpha
"Blicky"	2022	—	—	Alpha
"Feel"	2022	—	—	22
"Special Again"	2023	—	—	22
"Zero"	2024	—	—	Non-album single
"—" denotes a recording that did not chart or was not released in that territory.

==== As featured artist ====
Title	Year	Album
"Flair" (A2 featuring Octavian, Yxng Bane and Suspect)	2018	Purple
"New Shapes" (Diplo featuring Octavian)	2019	Europa
"Want" (J Rick featuring Octavian)	2019	No Retreat No Surrender
"Somewhere" (The Blaze featuring Octavian)	2020	Non-album single
"Friday 13th" (Gorillaz featuring Octavian)	2020	Song Machine, Season One: Strange Timez
"Savage" (South RC featuring Octavian)	2022	Non-album single
