= League of My Own II =

Studio album by Chip
- Released: 11 August 2017
- Recorded: 2015–17
- Genre: Hip hop; grime; dancehall
- Length: 64:12
- Label: Cash Motto
- Producer: Dready; H-Money; Flarve; Swifta Beater; The Fanatix; Tre Mission

Chip chronology
Power Up (2016)	League of My Own II (2017)	Ten10 (2018)

Singles from League of My Own II
- 1. "Gets Like That" Released: 28 June 2017; 2. "Honestly" Released: 12 July 2017

League of My Own II is the third studio album by British rapper Chip. It was released on 11 August 2017 by Cash Motto Limited. The album is the sequel to Chip's breakthrough mixtape League of My Own (2007) and marks its 10-year anniversary. It is Chip's first album in six years since Transition (2011) and parting ways with Sony Music. League of My Own II includes guest appearances from Giggs, Ghetts, Jme, Wiley, Donae'o, D Double E and Loick Essien, among others, as well as production from Dready, Swifta Beater and The Fanatix.

== Background ==
After the release of his second album, Transition (2011), Chip was released from his record label and was signed to American hip hop recording artist T.I.'s Grand Hustle Records, putting out the London Boy (2012) mixtape. Upon seeing little progression, Chip began releasing music independently under his Cash Motto label, distributing numerous EPs and mixtapes such as the Believe & Achieve series (2015) and Power Up (2016), making his return to grime

The album was made available to pre-order on 29 June 2017, while the tracklist was revealed on 24 July 2017 by Chip via Instagram. Commenting on the album, Chip stated: "League of My Own really helped push my career forward even though it was a mixtape. Now 10 years later I'm here again with my first independent album via my own label Cash Motto and I couldn't be happier. League Of My Own II is my most passionate, versatile piece of work to date and I hope the people enjoy it."

== Promotion ==
On 28 June 2017, Chip released the lead single to the album, "Gets Like That" featuring Ghetts, accompanied by its music video. The second single, "Honestly" featuring 67, was released on 11 July 2017, along with a music video uploaded to Chip's YouTube.

Numerous promotional singles and music videos were preceded by the album's release. "Snap Snap" was released on 16 July 2017 with a lyric video, followed by "34 Shots" on 26 July 2017. A music video for the grime posse cut "Scene" was released on 9 August 2017. On the album's release day, the music video for "Amazing Minds" featuring Giggs was uploaded.

== Critical reception ==
Professional ratings
Review scores
Source	Rating
The Observer	4/5 stars

In a positive review, Tara Joshi of The Observer commented that the album "largely finds Chip walking the walk. The strength of his bars is evident. The album has varied production that encompasses bashment ("Snap Snap"), wavy R&B ("Hit Me Up") and even drill ("Honestly"), along with far-ranging features (Wiley, Giggs, Ghetts and more), this is as much a statement of intent as an assured retrospective of what he's already achieved."

== Track listing ==
League of My Own II
No.	Title	Writer(s)	Producer(s)	Length
1.	"League of My Own II (The Intro)"	Jahmaal Fyffe	Dready	4:22
2.	"Gets Like That" (featuring Ghetts)	Fyffe; Justin Clarke	Tre Mission	4:00
3.	"Honestly" (featuring 67)	Fyffe; Dimzy; LD	Tre Mission	4:09
4.	"Snap Snap"	Fyffe	The Fanatix	2:33
5.	"Normal" (featuring Donae'o)	Fyffe; Ian Greenidge	Donae'o	3:17
6.	"Confirmed"	Fyffe	The Fanatix	4:41
7.	"34 Shots"	Fyffe	Swifta Beater	2:49
8.	"Good for You"	Fyffe	The Fanatix	3:13
9.	"Little Black Book (The Interlude)"	Fyffe		1:33
10.	"Amazing Minds" (featuring Giggs)	Fyffe; Nathaniel Thompson	Dready	2:57
11.	"Scene" (featuring Jammer, D Double E, Jme, Miraa May and Wiley)	Fyffe; Jahmek Power; Darren Dixon; Jamie Adenuga; Richard Cowie	Flarve	5:04
12.	"#YSN"	Fyffe	The Fanatix	3:36
13.	"About Time" (featuring Kojo Funds)	Fyffe; Kojo Funds		3:49
14.	"Hit Me Up" (featuring Ella Mai)	Fyffe; Ella Mai		4:51
15.	"Settings"	Fyffe	H-Money	3:26
16.	"Family" (featuring Loick Essien)	Fyffe; Loick Essien		5:58
17.	"Loop (The Outro)"	Fyffe		3:54
Total length:				64:12

== Charts ==
Chart (2017)	Peak position
UK Albums (Official Charts)	12
UK R&B Albums (Official Charts)	1

== Release history ==
Region	Date	Format	Label
United Kingdom	11 August 2017	CD, digital download	Cash Motto
