= Target (album) =

Studio album by Gerald Walker
- Released: September 22, 2015
- Recorded: 2012–2014
- Genre: Hip hop
- Labels: One Step at a Time Music; Virgin Music Group
- Producers: Gerald Walker; Add-2; Boonie Mayfield; Cardo; DJ Wally Sparks; Esta; Giorgio Ohlers; IAMNOBODI; J.LBS; Kuddie Fresh; Oddisee; Slot-A; Swiff D

Gerald Walker chronology
Yesterday You Said Tomorrow (2014)	Target (2015)

Singles from Target
- 1. "No Heart Feelings" Released: June 10, 2015

Target is the debut studio album by American hip hop recording artist Gerald Walker. The album was released on September 22, 2015, by One Step at a Time Music & Virgin Music Group. It is the first double album from Gerald Walker and the first album by Walker in collaboration with the eight-member vocal ensemble, The 7000. Target is also his first independent to digital retailer commercial album, whereas his previous releases were for promotional use only.

== Background and promotion ==
On February 3, 2014, Gerald Walker announced The Target Practice Tour, a 16 date North American tour beginning on February 8, 2014, through the end of April 2014. The tour was accompanied by a mixtape release entitled, "Yesterday You Said Tomorrow (A Prelude to TARGET)". The release featured a collection of demos that did not make the final TARGET release.

In June 2015, Walker announced his book Target: 52 Weeks to Completing My Album, a memoir about his life featuring stories and anecdotes simultaneously released with the album. On June 5, 2015, Walker released the first single from Target titled "No Heart Feelings" featuring The Family. On August 25, 2015, the second single from Target titled "Follow Through" was released. Upon its release, the album was supported by two additional concert tours. The first being the TARGET Listening Sessions, a 10 date, 8-city album listening event. During May 2016 Walker embarked a 15-date international tour supporting the album titled the TARGET World Tour.

== Track listing ==
Disc 1
No.	Title	Writer(s)	Producer(s)	Length
1.	"Watch Ya Step"	Gerald Walker	J.LBS	3:11
2.	"The Resist Stance"	Walker	Slot-A	3:30
3.	"100 Miles & Runnin'"	Walker	Esta	3:59
4.	"Walls of Jericho" (featuring Lee-Lon)	Walker; L. Walker	Swiff D	4:08
5.	"Invincible"	Walker	IAMNOBODI	3:36
6.	"Follow Through"	Walker	IAMNOBODI	2:48
7.	"The Realest"	Walker	J.LBS	2:39
8.	"Where Would I Be"	Walker	Oddisee	4:16
9.	"My Place"	Walker	Cardo	3:55
10.	"No Heart Feelings"	Walker	Giorgio Ohlers	2:58
11.	"TARGET Closing Theme"	Walker; A. Daniels	Gerald Walker; Add-2	1:24
12.	"Target"	Walker	Kuddie Fresh	3:37

Disc 2
No.	Title	Writer(s)	Producer(s)	Length
1.	"We've Come So Far But Still Have Ways To Go"	Gerald Walker	Boonie Mayfield	2:11
2.	"Yawning At Tigers"	Walker	Kuddie Fresh	3:41
3.	"Let Us In"	Walker	Kuddie Fresh	4:42
4.	"No More"	Walker	J.LBS	5:07
5.	"Easy Money" (featuring Jack Freeman)	Walker	Kuddie Fresh	4:05
6.	"Alkebulan"	Walker	IAMNOBODI	1:33
7.	"Danziger Bridge"	Walker	Boonie Mayfield	2:22
8.	"Danziger Bridge (Reprise)"	Walker	Boonie Mayfield	1:04
9.	"Lessons of The Dead Taught By The Dying"	Walker	DJ Wally Sparks	1:54
10.	"Us Against The World"	Walker	J. LBS	3:12
11.	"Tell The Wolves I'm Home"	Walker	Slot-A	4:07
Total length:				74:07
