= Bullet from a Gun =

2019 single by Skepta

Single by Skepta

from the album Ignorance Is Bliss
- Released: 9 May 2019
- Length: 2:51
- Label: Boy Better Know
- Songwriters: Joseph Adenuga; Daniel Mukungu
- Producers: Skepta; Ragz Originale

Skepta singles chronology
"Bet" (2019)	"Bullet from a Gun" (2019)	"Greaze Mode" (2019)

"Bullet from a Gun" is a song performed by English rapper Skepta. It was released as the second single from Skepta's fifth studio album Ignorance Is Bliss on 9 May 2019 through Boy Better Know. The song peaked at number 32 on the UK Singles Chart.

== Music video ==
A music video to accompany the release of "Bullet from a Gun" was first released onto YouTube on 26 May 2019.

== Charts ==
Chart (2019)	Peak position
Ireland (IRMA)	61
New Zealand Hot Singles (RMNZ)	25
UK Singles (OCC)	32
UK Hip Hop/R&B (OCC)	13

== Certifications ==
Certifications for "Bullet from a Gun"
Region	Certification	Certified units/sales
United Kingdom (BPI)	Silver	200,000^{‡}
^{‡} Sales+streaming figures based on certification alone.

== Release history ==
Region	Date	Format	Label
United Kingdom	9 May 2019	Digital download; streaming	Boy Better Know
