= Love Me Not (Skepta song) =

Single by Skepta featuring Cheb Rabi and B Live

from the album Ignorance Is Bliss
- Released: 29 July 2019
- Length: 3:23
- Label: Boy Better Know
- Songwriter(s): Joseph Adenuga; Rabiullah Sikander; James Barbe; Sophie Ellis-Bextor; Gregg Alexander
- Producer(s): Skepta

Skepta singles chronology
"Back to Basics" (2019)	"Love Me Not" (2019)	"Welcome to the Party (Remix)" (2019)

Cheb Rabi singles chronology
"Love Me Not" (2019)

B Live singles chronology
"Love Me Not" (2019)

"Love Me Not" is a song performed by English rapper Skepta, featuring vocals from Cheb Rabi and B Live. The song features a sample from "Murder on the Dancefloor" by Sophie Ellis-Bextor. It was released as the fourth single from Skepta's fifth studio album Ignorance Is Bliss on 29 July 2019 through Boy Better Know.

== Music video ==
A music video to accompany the release of "Love Me Not" was first released onto YouTube on 28 July 2019.

== Charts ==
Chart (2019)	Peak position
UK Hip Hop/R&B (OCC)	24

== Release history ==
Region	Date	Format	Label
United Kingdom	29 July 2019	Digital download; streaming	Boy Better Know
