= What Do You Mean? (Skepta song) =

2019 song by Skepta

Song by Skepta featuring J Hus

from the album Ignorane Is Bliss
- Released: 2019
- Length: 3:31
- Label: Boy Better Know
- Songwriters: Joseph Adenuga; Momodou Jallow; Ayodele Oyadare
- Producer: iO

"What Do You Mean?" is a song recorded by British rapper Skepta featuring British rapper J Hus that appears on Skepta's studio album Ignorance Is Bliss. The song was written by Skepta, J Hus and Ayodele Oyadare (aka iO), and produced by iO.

Commercially, the song reached the top 20 in the United Kingdom and top 30 on the New Zealand Hot Singles Chart.

== Charts ==
Chart (2019)	Peak position
New Zealand Hot Singles (Recorded Music NZ)	24
UK Singles (OCC)	14
UK Hip Hop/R&B (OCC)	3

== Certifications ==
Certifications for What Do You Mean
Region	Certification	Certified units/sales
United Kingdom (BPI)	Gold	400,000^{‡}
^{‡} Sales+streaming figures based on certification alone.
