= Spaceman (Octavian album) =

Studio album by Octavian
- Released: 10 September 2018
- Genre: Grime
- Length: 36:48
- Label: Black Butter

Octavian chronology
Essie World (2017)	Spaceman (2018)	Endorphins (2019)

Spaceman (stylized as SPACEMAN) is a 2018 album by Octavian marketed as a mixtape. It includes guest appearances from Krimbo, Suspect, Swift, and A2. The cover art was created by Virgil Abloh, Armin Druzanovic, and Michael Phan. Music videos were created for "Revenge", "Here Is Not Safe", and "Move Faster". The mixtape peaked at number 98 on the UK Albums Chart.

== Critical reception ==
Professional ratings
Aggregate scores
Source	Rating
Metacritic	81/100
Review scores
Source	Rating
Clash	8/10
The Guardian	3/5 stars
Pitchfork	8.0/10

At Metacritic, which assigns a weighted average score out of 100 to reviews from mainstream critics, the mixtape received an average score of 81, based on 5 reviews, indicating "universal acclaim".

=== Accolades ===
Publication	Accolade	Rank	Ref.
NME	Albums of the Year 2018	79	
Noisey	100 Best Albums of 2018	29	

== Track listing ==
No.	Title	Length
1.	"Scared"	1:07
2.	"Sleep" (featuring Krimbo)	2:46
3.	"Don't Cry"	2:22
4.	"Stand Down"	2:43
5.	"This Is My World"	3:19
6.	"Build"	2:24
7.	"Break That" (featuring Suspect)	2:40
8.	"Move Faster"	3:19
9.	"Here Is Not Safe"	2:00
10.	"54321" (featuring Swift)	2:53
11.	"Revenge"	1:42
12.	"Lightning"	3:55
13.	"You See It?"	2:11
14.	"Think Twice" (featuring A2)	3:20

== Charts ==
Chart (2018)	Peak position
UK Albums (OCC)	98
UK R&B Albums (OCC)	35
