= Waze (song) =

Single by Skepta, Chip and Young Adz

from the album Insomnia
- Released: 25 March 2020
- Length: 3:17
- Label: SKC M29
- Songwriter(s): Joseph Adenuga; Jahmaal Fyffe; Adam Williams; Ronald LaTour Jr.
- Producer(s): Cardo

Skepta singles chronology
| "Papi Chulo" (2020) | "Waze" (2020) | "How Far?" (2020) |

Chip singles chronology
| "Top Striker" (2020) | "Waze" (2020) | "0420 (R.I.P Black the Ripper)" (2020) |

Young Adz singles chronology
| "All of My Love" (2020) | "Waze" (2020) |

"Waze" is a song performed by British rappers Skepta, Chip and Young Adz. It was released as a single on 25 March 2020 through SKC M29 as the lead single from their collaborative studio album Insomnia. The song peaked at number 18 on the UK Singles Chart. The song was written by Joseph Adenuga, Jahmaal Fyffe, Adam Williams and produced by Cardo.

== Music video ==
A music video to accompany the release of "Waze" was first released on YouTube on 25 March 2020.

== Charts ==
| Chart (2020) | Peak position |
|---|---|
| Ireland (IRMA) | 71 |
| UK Singles (OCC) | 18 |
| UK Indie (OCC) | 1 |
| UK Hip Hop/R&B (OCC) | 10 |

== Release history ==
| Region | Date | Format | Label |
|---|---|---|---|
| United Kingdom | 25 March 2020 | Digital download; streaming | SKC M29 |
