= It's Christmastime Again, Gerald Walker =

Studio album (holiday album) by Gerald Walker & The Family
- Released: November 17, 2011
- Recorded: 2011; The Delivery Room Studios (Fox Point, Wisconsin)
- Genres: R&B; hip hop; holiday; urban holiday
- Label: One Step at a Time Music
- Producers: (Executive producers): Gerald Walker; Ronald LaTour; Edward Murray; Matt Axelson; Mohammad Shah; (Associate executive) Ebony Haynes (Musical producers): Chemist; RMB Justize; Slot-A

Gerald Walker & The Family chronology
The Other Half of Letting Go (2011)	It's Christmastime Again, Gerald Walker (2011)	Believers Never Die (2011)

It's Christmastime Again, Gerald Walker is the second Christmas album and third studio album by American recording artist Gerald Walker. It is the first album released as Gerald Walker & The Family and was released in the United States on November 17, 2011 by One Step at a Time Music.

== Background ==
Originally announced as a re-release of Walker's 2010 A Gerald Walker Christmas EP, the idea was later abandoned and seven new original songs we're then recorded. This is Gerald Walker's second Christmas-themed album mirrored after the comic strip Peanuts by Charles M. Schulz. It's Christmastime Again, Gerald Walker and his inaugural A Gerald Walker Christmas EP were named after A Charlie Brown Christmas and It's Christmastime Again, Charlie Brown respectively. This also served as Gerald Walker's third release in 2011.

== Singles ==
The album's first single "Christmas Everyday", produced by longtime collaborator Chemist, was also written and co-produced by Walker himself. It contained an interpolation of Fred Hammond & Radical For Christ's song of the same name and was released November 10, 2011.

== Track listing ==
No.	Title	Writer(s)	Producer(s)	Length
1.	"Overture"	Gerald Walker	RMB Justize; Gerald Walker	1:12
2.	"Christmas Everyday"	Gerald Walker; Fred Hammond; N. Hall	Chemist; Gerald Walker; Thurston "RoyalT" Magill; (Saxophone)	3:43
3.	"A Merry Good Christmas"	Gerald Walker	Slot-A	3:41
4.	"I Want It All"	Gerald Walker; M. Tep	Cardo	3:51
5.	"I'll Be Home For Christmas..."	Gerald Walker	Chemist	3:57
6.	"All I Want For Christmas Is Zoe Saldana..."	Gerald Walker	RMB Justize	3:12
7.	"My Name I Gabriel (The Annunciation)"	Gerald Walker	RMB Justize	3:49

== Credits ==
- Gerald Walker - vocals
- Cardo - producer
- Chemist - producer
- RMB Justize - producer
- Matt Richards - mastering
- Tayse Solo - engineer
- Thurston "RoyalT" Magill - saxophone
- Edward "Sledgren" Murray - executive producer
- Ronald "Cardo" LaTour - executive producer
