= Ten10 (album) =

Studio album by Chip
- Released: 21 September 2018
- Length: 34:09
- Label: Cash Motto; Warner
- Producer: Ayo Beatz; CDot; D'Mile; Diztortion; Dro; Lil Silva; Moses Samuels; Olaniyi Akinkunmi; Parker; Sampha; Sevaqk; The Fanatix; Victizzle

Chip chronology
League of My Own II (2017)	Ten10 (2018)	Insomnia (2020)

Singles from Ten10
- 1. "Darth Vader" Released: 14 June 2018; 2. "My Girl" Released: 24 August 2018

Ten10 is the fourth studio album by British rapper Chip. It was released on 21 September 2018 by Cash Motto Limited. It succeeds Chip's third album, League of My Own II, released in 2017. The album consists of ten tracks with production from The Fanatix, Lil Silva and Sampha, alongside guest appearances from B Young, Frisco, Jme, Not3s and Red Rat.

== Background ==
Ten10 was announced on 23 August 2018, alongside availability to pre-order. Commenting on the album, Chip stated: "It's my first clinically precise album. Ten10 — as in ten out of ten — has ten tracks, each track being a ten-ten representation of versatility, growth, lyricism, unique production and pushing boundaries creatively, as well as me recently touching the cusp of ten years in my career."

== Release and promotion ==
The first single, "Darth Vader", was released on 14 June 2018 for streaming and digital download, alongside a music video. Alongside the announcement of the album, the second single "My Girl" featuring Jamaican dancehall artist Red Rat was released on 24 August 2018.

== Track listing ==
Ten10
No.	Title	Writer(s)	Producer(s)	Length
1.	"Thoughts"	Jahmaal Fyffe	D'Mile	3:23
2.	"Right Now" (featuring Jme and Frisco)	Fyffe; Jamie Adenuga; Deshane Cornwall	Sevaqk	3:26
3.	"CRB Check" (featuring Not3s)	Fyffe; Lukman Odunaike; Raoul Chen	Diztortion	3:03
4.	"I.F.W.U"	Fyffe; Mark Hill; Craig David	Victizzle	3:47
5.	"Darth Vader"	Fyffe; Sampha Sisay; TJ Carter	Lil Silva; Sampha	3:14
6.	"Take the Lead" (featuring B Young)	Fyffe; Bertan Jafer	Ayo Beatz	2:48
7.	"My Girl" (featuring Red Rat)	Fyffe; Pascalle Dillett; Wallace Wilson	The Fanatix; CDot; Dro; Mastapiece	3:14
8.	"Human" (featuring Maleek Berry and Kranium)	Fyffe; Maleek Shoyebi; Kemar Donaldson	Parker	3:45
9.	"Vampire Life"	Fyffe	Moses Samuels; Olaniyi Akinkunmi	3:34
10.	"Good Morning Britain"	Fyffe	Parker	3:55
Total length:				34:09

== Charts ==
Chart (2018)	Peak position
UK Albums (OCC)	17

== Release history ==
Region	Date	Format	Label
United Kingdom	21 September 2018	CD, digital download	Cash Motto
