= Back to Basics (song) =

2019 single by Headie One featuring Skepta

Single by Headie One featuring Skepta

from the album Music x Road
- Released: 4 July 2019
- Length: 3:14
- Label: Relentless Records
- Songwriters: Joseph Junior Adenuga: Irving Ampofo Adjei; Nyandoro Kelly

Headie One singles chronology
"All Day" (2019)	"Back to Basics" (2019)	"I Spy" (2019)

Skepta singles chronology
"Greaze Mode" (2019)	"Back to Basics" (2019)	"Love Me Not" (2019)

"Back to Basics" is a song performed by British rapper and songwriter Headie One, featuring vocals from English rapper Skepta. It was released as the third single from Headie One's mixtape Music x Road on 4 July 2019 through Relentless Records. The song peaked at number 42 on the UK Singles Chart.

== Music video ==
A music video to accompany the release of "Back to Basics" was first released onto YouTube on 5 July 2019.

== Charts ==
Chart (2019)	Peak position
UK Singles (Official Charts)	42
UK Hip Hop/R&B (Official Charts)	27

== Release history ==
Region	Date	Format	Label
United Kingdom	4 July 2019	Digital download; streaming	Relentless Records
