= Xavier Ruffin =

Xavier Ruffin (born January 14, 1988) is an American creative director, filmmaker and designer. He is Creative Director at Cynosure Creative Agency and a member of the Board of Trustees of the Milwaukee Institute of Art & Design (MIAD). Ruffin first received national attention as the creator of Mad Black Men, an independent web series examining race and representation in the advertising industry. His later work has included digital and social-media campaigns for television and streaming projects including Netflix's She's Gotta Have It and Amazon Studios' Good Omens and As We See It.

== Early life and education ==
Ruffin, who is African-American, was born on January 14, 1988, in Little Rock, Arkansas, and was raised in Milwaukee, Wisconsin. Ruffin exhibited a passion for music and the arts at a very young age. In the third grade he was featured in a local magazine along with his school band as a young blues guitar player, though he actually he played the cello. He participated in the Milwaukee Institute of Art and Design Pre-College program beginning while he was in middle school. In 2007, his photography was selected for the Wisconsin Regional Scholastic Art Awards exhibition at the Milwaukee Art Museum, where he received a Gold Key Award.

Ruffin later attended MIAD, studying Communication Design with a business minor. He received his BFA in Communication Design in 2010.

== Career ==
He began his design career at Kohl's© where he helped create internet ads as well as layouts for Kohls.com. In 2013 Ruffin was contacted by a Dailymotion executive who saw his work on music video spoofs via YouTube and worked for the company as a preferred content creator. He then earned backing from Dailymotion to launch the web series Mad Black Men through the company's Motion Maker's Fund Grant. Ruffin got connected with Robert Townsend, who advised and helped pull the cast and crew.

By 2015, Milwaukee Magazine described Ruffin as running Dopamine Productions and noted his design and motion-graphics work for both Milwaukee artists and nationally known musicians.

In 2016, Ruffin directed the short film Saint Paul, which screened as part of the Milwaukee Film Festival's Milwaukee Show. The film depicts the aftermath of a fatal 2015 car accident and shooting in Milwaukee.

In 2016, Ruffin participated in the People's Flag of Milwaukee initiative through the Greater Together coalition. He served on a five-member judging panel that reviewed 1,006 submitted designs and selected 45 semifinalists and five finalists for public consideration.

=== Mad Black Men ===
Ruffin received national attention in 2014 for creating Mad Black Men, a satirical independent web series inspired by AMC's Mad Men. The series follows Black advertising professionals working in the 1960s and addresses the limited representation of African Americans in popular depictions of the advertising industry.

The project received coverage from NPR's All Things Considered, Advertising Age, IndieWire and Wisconsin Public Radio. Ruffin told NPR that his dissatisfaction with the representation of Black people in Mad Men helped inspire him to create the series.

=== Creative direction and entertainment marketing ===
Ruffin later became Creative Director at Cynosure Creative Agency. In that role, he has worked on digital and social-media campaigns for entertainment properties.

Cynosure and Netflix's Instagram campaign for Spike Lee's She's Gotta Have It credited Ruffin as Creative Director. The campaign used the fictional artwork and perspective of lead character Nola Darling to extend the narrative of the television series onto Instagram and included the "#MyNameIsnt" social activation.

In 2021, Ruffin designed the poster artwork for Brad Lichtenstein's documentary When Claude Got Shot through Cynosure Creative Agency and was credited by PBS for titles and design. The film later won the 2022 Primetime Emmy Award for Exceptional Merit in Documentary Filmmaking.

Ruffin was also credited as Creative Director on Cynosure and Amazon Studios' social campaign for the second season of Good Omens. The campaign received the 16th Annual Shorty Award and Audience Honor in the Campaign by Diverse-Owned Businesses category and was named a 2024 Webby Awards Honoree in Social Television & Film.

Cynosure's social campaign for Amazon Studios' As We See It, on which Ruffin received an agency credit, was named a category winner in the People with Disabilities category of the 2023 ANA Multicultural Excellence Awards.

In 2024, Ruffin served as visual effects producer and art director on the PBS American Experience documentary American Coup: Wilmington 1898. The documentary was subsequently named a Peabody Award nominee.

Ruffin is also a member of the Board of Trustees of the Milwaukee Institute of Art & Design, where he is identified as a 2010 alumnus and Creative Director of Cynosure Creative Agency.

=== Awards and recognition ===
- Individual artistic recognition
  - 2005 - Scholastic Art & Writing Awards, National Silver Award, Painting, Red, White and Black
  - 2006 - Scholastic Art & Writing Awards, National Gold Award, Photography, Self-Reflection
- Professional campaign recognition
  - 2019 - Webby Awards Honoree, Television & Film, She's Gotta Have It on Instagram, Cynosure Creative Agency / Netflix.
  - 2023 - Silver Clio Entertainment Award, Motion Graphics, Paper Girls - Cassette Tape Moments, Cynosure Creative Agency / Prime Video.
  - 2023 - ANA Multicultural Excellence Award, People with Disabilities, As We See It social campaign, Cynosure Creative Agency / Amazon Studios.
  - 2024 - Silver Clio Entertainment Award, Motion Graphics, THEM: The Scare - Stop Motion Yarn, Cynosure Creative Agency / Prime Video.
  - 2024 - Shorty Award and Audience Honor, Campaign by Diverse-Owned Businesses, Good Omens Season 2.
  - 2024 - Webby Awards Honoree, Television & Film Campaigns, Good Omens Season 2. The Webby entry directly lists Xavier as Creative Director.
  - 2024 - Peabody Award nominee, American Coup: Wilmington 1898 | VFX Producer / Art Director
  - 2025 - Silver Clio Entertainment Award, Motion Graphics, Secret Level - Demo Disc Teaser, Cynosure Creative Agency / Amazon MGM Studios and Prime Video. The Clio entry directly credits Xavier as Creative Director.

Xavier has animation, vfx, title design, and director credits on music videos with Riff Raff (rapper), T.I., Donald Glover, OG Maco, Mac Miller, Gerald Walker, and others.

=== Music Video Videography ===
as Director

Bullshit (2014)	Raz Simone
Let It Go (2014)	Raz Simone
Watchmen (2014)	Ben Kerns
Is It Me (2013)	Black Fitted
Forever Whatever (2013)	Klassik
One of These Kids (2013)	Dana Coppafeel & Speak Easy
Fools For Rowan (2012)	Killed A Man Today
Finest Gangsta (2012)	Yo-dot
Anything (2012)	Klassik
On Ten (2012)	Proph
Bulletproof Soul (2012)	Gerald Walker
Thinking About You (2012)	Troy'ce Sayles
PSTFU (2012)	Gerald Walker
Jungle (2011)	Prophetic
The Missing Piece (2011)	Gerald Walker
I pooted (Big Sean I Do It Spoof) (2011)	Mrr Vanilla

as Animator

2mph (2015)	Danna Coppafeel, SpeakEasy, and Haz Solo
Kokaine (2014)	Riff Raff
Lava Glaciers (2014)	Riff Raff ft Childish Gambino
Aquaberry Dolphines (2014)	Riff Raff ft Mac Miller
Wit Me (2014)	B.o.B.
Wit Me (2013)	T.I.
On Dat Ho (2012)	Jazz Lazer
Hot Shots Part Deux (2012)	Action Bronson

as Editor

2mph (2015)	Danna Coppafeel, SpeakEasy, and Haz Solo
How To Be The Man (2014)	RiFF RAFF
Forever Whatever (2013)	Klassik
Hot Shots Part Deux (2012)	Action Bronson

as Writer

Anything (2012)	Klassik
I pooted (Big Sean I Do It Spoof) (2011)	Mrr Vanilla

as Title Designer

King (2014)	T.I.
I Need War (2014)	T.I.
The Way We Ride (2013)	T.I.

as VFX

Action Bronson Skee TV skit (2015)	Action Bronson
King (2014) T.I.	
Plates Say Texas (DGK) (2013)	Trae Tha Truth

as Animation Director (1)

Memories Back Then (2013)	Hustle Gang

as Art Director (1)

Memories Back Then (2013)	Hustle Gang

=== Filmography ===
s Director (2)

Saint Paul (2016)	Short Film
Mad Black Men (2014)	Web Series
Anything (2012)	Short Film

as Editor (2)

Mad Black Men (2014)	Web Series
Anything (2012)	Short Film

as Writer (2)

Mad Black Men (2014)	Web Series
Anything (2012)	Klassik
