= Bet (song) =

2019 single by Octavian featuring Skepta and Michael Phantom

Single by Octavian featuring Skepta & Michael Phantom

from the album Endorphins
- Released: 1 March 2019
- Genre: Trap
- Length: 2:46
- Label: Black Butter Records
- Songwriter(s): Joseph Junior Adenuga: Marvin Banks; Octavian; Michael Phantom; Keanu Torres

Octavian singles chronology
"Stressed" (2019)	"Bet" (2019)	"Lit" (2019)

Skepta singles chronology
"Wish You Were Here" (2019)	"Bet" (2019)	"Bullet from a Gun" (2019)

"Bet" is a song performed by French-British rapper, singer and songwriter Octavian, featuring vocals from English rapper Skepta and Michael Phantom. It was the lead single from Octavian's mixtape Endorphins, released by Black Butter Records on March 1, 2019. The song peaked at number 44 on the UK Singles Chart.

== Music video ==
A music video to accompany the release of "Bet" was first released onto YouTube on 27 February 2019.

== Charts ==
Chart (2019)	Peak position
UK Singles (OCC)	44
UK Hip Hop/R&B (OCC)	25

== Certifications ==
Certifications for "Bet"
Region	Certification	Certified units/sales
New Zealand (RMNZ)	Gold	15,000^{‡}
^{‡} Sales+streaming figures based on certification alone.

== Release history ==
Region	Date	Format	Label
United Kingdom	1 March 2019	Digital download; streaming	Black Butter Records
