= J Rick =

- Born: 16 April 1996 (age 30)
- Origin: London, England
- Genres: Dance; electronic
- Occupations: Artist, Producer
- Years active: 2016-present
- Label: Warner Records

Jordan Cian Christie (born 16 April 1996), better known by his stage name J Rick, is a London-based musician and producer. He produced the breakthrough singles "Party Here", "Hands" and "Lightning", the last of which was also featured in the video game FIFA 19. Noisey described "Party Here" as "a defining track in the cross-genre melange that makes up forward-thinking, left-leaning modern UK rap."

J Rick as a touring DJ played at Field Day, All Points East, Eurosonic, Kentish Town Forum and more.

J Rick has since gone to release his own music and accompanying music videos. Each music video so far has been directed solely by Armin Druzanovic, with the only exception being the video for the single 'Gone', which was co-directed by Barney Clark. Rick's latest single 'Close' features Eritian-born singer Rimon, the first collaborator on a J Rick single. Like all of Rick's previous singles, the video for the single was uploaded to the Views TV YouTube channel. All of J Rick's singles have been released by Warner Records UK.

J Rick has received radio play from BBC 1Xtra, Worldwide FM, Benji B, Gilles Peterson and Toddla T. Rick also had a NTS Radio residency across 6 months in 2019.

Rick's uncle and one of his biggest inspirations is the late professional boxer Errol Christie, also known for his book How I Put The Black In The Union Jack. J Rick has tattooed Errol Christie's mantra "No retreat, no surrender" on his skin. Appeared in Dazed's 100 list in 2020.

J Rick collaborated with clothing brand Napapijri for the launch of their SS20 collection during London Fashion Week in 2020.

Rick has been featured in The Line of Best Fit and Clash Magazine publications as well as releasing mixes in collaboration with Dazed Magazine and Highsnobiety's mix series.

== No Retreat No Surrender ==
On 27 September 2019, Rick released his debut mixtape No Retreat No Surrender in commemoration of his uncle Errol Christie. Rick said of the project that "This record means a lot to me; its my first solo project release and is commemoration of my uncle Errol Christie who died in June 2017. [...] It’s mad important for me to put out my own project cause I was working on this before I even started working with other people." The mixtape features Obongjayar on the song 'Surprise' and Rimon on the mixtape's third song 'Close'. It was described by Mixmag as having 'shades of grime, garage and hip hop and suggests Christie's trademark spacious productions could come to dominate UK rap for years to come'. The mixtape featured as number 1 in Jamz Supernova's EP Top 5.

== Singles & EPs ==
Year	Title
2019	"Gone"
2019	"Short"
2019	"Here"
2019	"Close"
2019	"Denzel Curry - SPEEDBOAT (remix)"
2019	"Want"

== Production discography ==
Year	Title	Artist
2021	Mornin | Streetlights	Dawn Richard
2020	Charades	Fred Again..., Headie One
2020	Ruins	Teddy, J Rick
2019	SPEEDBOAT (remix)	Denzel Curry, SL, J Rick
2019	Walking Alone (SBTRKT Cover)	Octavian
2018	Hands	Octavian
2019	Endorphins	Octavian
2017	Party Here	Octavian

J Rick has also featured on the production series Against The Clock.

== Remixes ==
J Rick collaborated with London rapper SL for a remix of Denzel Curry's track 'SPEEDBOAT'.
