= Cardo (music producer) =

American record producer and rapper

- Also known as: Cardo; Cardo Got Wings
- Born: Ronald Nathan LaTour Jr. September 24, 1984 (age 42); St. Paul, Minnesota, U.S.
- Genres: Hip-hop; trap; R&B
- Occupations: Record producer; rapper; songwriter
- Years active: 2010–present
- Labels: Def Jam; Fool's Gold; Taylor Gang

Ronald Nathan LaTour Jr. (born September 24, 1984), professionally known as Cardo Got Wings or simply Cardo, is an American record producer and rapper. He's known for his works with Playboi Carti, Kendrick Lamar, and Wiz Khalifa, among others. He also produced God's Plan by Drake, as well as Goosebumps by Travis Scott and Kendrick Lamar.

== Early life and career ==
Cardo was born and raised in St. Paul, Minnesota. He then moved to Fort Worth, Texas.

In 2010, Cardo was producing for Mac Miller and Chevy Woods and subsequently met Wiz Khalifa at a show in Texas through Chevy Woods and his uncle Motor. Cardo gave Khalifa a couple of his beats, which would end up on Khalifa's Kush & Orange Juice mixtape. Cardo then started producing for other artists.

Cardo and Payroll Giovanni signed record deals with Def Jam Records in December 2017.

Cardo is the founder and CEO of the record label Everything is Gold Music (EISG). Cardo was previously a member of, and producer on, Taylor Gang Records, and is currently signed to Fool's Gold Records. He has produced on many rappers' albums and singles including Curren$y, 2 Chainz, Drake, Skepta, Kendrick Lamar, Travi$ Scott, ScHoolboy Q, Meek Mill, The Game, Wiz Khalifa, R. Kelly, Jeezy, Jay Z, Frank Dukes and Swizz Beatz, among others. In June 2022, he signed Atlanta rapper YoDogg to EISG, in a joint venture with Epic Records.

Cardo's professional name was derived from relatives who named him 'Ricardo' the Puerto Rican, despite being fully aware of his Caucasian and African American descent.

== Discography ==
=== Mixtapes ===
List of albums, with selected details
Title	Album details
Mademan (Note: Stylized as MADeMAN.)	Released: September 24, 2024; Label: Madhouse, Empire; Formats: Digital download, streaming

=== Extended plays ===
List of albums, with selected details
Title	EP details
LSC: Everybody's Favourite Cousin	Released: July 27, 2019; Label: EI$G; Formats: Digital download, streaming
The Green Tape EP (with Curren$y)	Released: April 10, 2020 Label: Jet Life Recordings Formats: Digital Download, streaming

=== Collaborative albums / mixtapes ===
List of albums, with selected details
Title	Album details
Big Bossin, Vol. 1 (with Payroll Giovanni)	Released: May 13, 2016; Label: BYLUG, Empire; Format: Digital download
Big Bossin, Vol. 2 (with Payroll Giovanni)	Released: January 26, 2018; Label: Def Jam; Format: Digital download
Pi'erre & Cardo's Wild Adventure (with Pi'erre Bourne)	Released: December 25, 2018; Label: Self-released; Format: Streaming
Game Related (with Larry June, Payroll Giovanni & HBK Kid)	Released: January 27, 2020; Label: EISG, TFM, BYLUG; Format: Digital download
Cruise USA (with Larry June)	Released: May 7, 2020; Label: EISG, TFM, BYLUG; Format: Digital download
Another Day Another Dollar (with Payroll Giovanni)	Released: February 26, 2021; Label: BYLUG, Empire; Format: Digital download
Into the Late Night (with Larry June)	Released: September 24, 2021; Label: EISG, TFM, BYLUG; Format: Digital download
Wiz Got Wings (with Wiz Khalifa & Sledgren)	Released: December 10, 2021; Label: Taylor Gang; Format: Digital download
Raised by Wolves (with YoDogg)	Released: July 15, 2022; Label: EISG, Epic; Format: Digital download
The Night Shift (with Larry June)	Released: November 10, 2023; Label: Empire; Format: Digital download

== Production discography ==
=== Songs produced ===
List of songs produced, with selected chart positions and certifications, showing year released and album name
Title	Year	Peak chart positions					Certifications	Album
Title	Year	US	US R&B/HH	CAN	FRA	UK	Certifications	Album
"Levels" (Meek Mill)	2013	—	43	—	—	—	RIAA: Gold	Self Made Vol. 3
"Seen It All" (Jeezy featuring Jay-Z)	2014	85	24	—	—	—	RIAA: Platinum	Seen It All: The Autobiography
"100" (The Game featuring Drake)	2015	82	25	63	—	179	RIAA: Platinum	The Documentary 2
"untitled 07 | levitate" (Kendrick Lamar)	2016	90	27	—	197	93		untitled unmastered
"That Part" (ScHoolboy Q featuring Kanye West)	2016	40	13	51	—	—	RIAA: 2× Platinum	Blank Face LP
"Through the Late Night" (Travis Scott featuring Kid Cudi)	2016	—	43	—	—	—	RIAA: 2× Platinum	Birds in the Trap Sing McKnight
"Goosebumps" (Travis Scott featuring Kendrick Lamar)	2016	32	21	56	—	90	RIAA: 17× Platinum	Birds in the Trap Sing McKnight
"God" (Kendrick Lamar)	2017	58	33	50	192	81	RIAA: Gold	Damn
"No Promises" (A Boogie wit da Hoodie)	2017	74	32	—	—	—	RIAA: Platinum	The Bigger Artist
"God's Plan" (Drake)	2018	1	1	1	11	1	RIAA: 16× Platinum	Scary Hours
"Big Shot" (Kendrick Lamar and Travis Scott)	2018	71	35	54	—	55		Black Panther: The Album
"Landed" (Drake)	2020	39	22	35	—	—		Dark Lane Demo Tapes
"Laugh Now Cry Later" (Drake featuring Lil Durk)	2020	2	2	1	50	4	RIAA: 6× Platinum	Non-album singles
"Waze" (Skepta, Chip and Young Adz)	2020	—	—	—	—	—		Non-album singles
"Euphoria" (Kendrick Lamar)	2024	3	3	5	76	11		Non-album singles
"K Pop" (Playboi Carti)	2025	38	18	50	—	77		Music
"Mojo Jojo" (Playboi Carti)	2025	—	—	—	—	—		Music
"Philly" (Playboi Carti with Travis Scott)	2025	—	—	—	—	—		Music
"Toxic" (Playboi Carti with Skepta)	2025	—	—	—	—	—		Music
"Crank" (Playboi Carti)	2025	—	—	—	—	—		Music
"Good Credit" (Playboi Carti with Kendrick Lamar)	2025	17	—	—	—	—		Music
"HBA" (Playboi Carti)	2025	—	—	—	—	—		Music
"Backr00ms" (Playboi Carti with Travis Scott)	2025	—	—	—	—	—		Music

== Production credits ==
List of songs produced, with any other producers, showing year released and album name
Title	Year	Other producers	Album
"Mezmorized" (Wiz Khalifa)	2010		Kush & Orange Juice
"In the Cut" (Wiz Khalifa)	2010		Kush & Orange Juice
"Shaft" (Chevy Woods)	2011		Red Cup Music
"Goodnight" (Gerald Walker)	2011		On Your Side
"Follow Your Dreams, Forget The Scene" (Gerald Walker)	2011		On Your Side
"We Don't Give A F*ck" (Gerald Walker)	2011	Sledgren	On Your Side
"Highspeed" (Gerald Walker)	2011		On Your Side
"Circles" (Gerald Walker featuring El Prez, Bryant Stewart & Taylor Kaye)	2011		On Your Side
"Here's Everything I've Always Meant To Say" (Gerald Walker)	2011		On Your Side
"I Hope I Don't Fall In Love With Her..." (Gerald Walker)	2011		On Your Side
"Miserable At Best" (Gerald Walker featuring Rockie Fresh)	2011		On Your Side
"Dro By The Pound" (Gerald Walker)	2011		On Your Side
"Become What You Hate" (Gerald Walker)	2011		On Your Side
"On Your Side" (Gerald Walker)	2011		On Your Side
"Grind'n" (Dom Kennedy)	2011		From the Westside with Love, II
"I Love Dom" (Dom Kennedy)	2011		From the Westside with Love, II
"We Out" (Smoke DZA)	2011		Rolling Stoned
"It's All Real" (Gerald Walker)	2011		The Other Half of Letting Go
"B.A.N.ned" (Freddie Gibbs)	2011		Cold Day in Hell
"My Homeboy's Girlfriend" (Freddie Gibbs)	2011		Cold Day in Hell
"Menace II Society" (Freddie Gibbs featuring Dom Kennedy & Polyester)	2011		Cold Day in Hell
"My Dawgz" (Freddie Gibbs)	2011		Cold Day in Hell
"I Want It All" (Gerald Walker)	2011		It's Christmastime Again, Gerald Walker
"World Class" (Snoop Dogg & Wiz Khalifa)	2011		Mac & Devin Go to High School
"That Good" (Snoop Dogg & Wiz Khalifa)	2011		Mac & Devin Go to High School
"California" (Wiz Khalifa)	2012		Taylor Allderdice
"Mary 3x" (Wiz Khalifa)	2012		Taylor Allderdice
"O.N.I.F.C." (Wiz Khalifa)	2012	Sledgren	Taylor Allderdice
"Brainstorm" (Wiz Khalifa)	2012		Taylor Allderdice
"Ignorant" (Mac Miller featuring Cam'ron)	2012		Macadelic
"Showroom" (Curren$y)	2012		The Stoned Immaculate
"New Beginning" (C-Bo featuring Marvaless, Rydah J. Klyde & T-Nutty)	2012		Orca
"Keep It So Real" (King Chip)	2012		Represent The Stripes
"Great" (Sir Michael Rocks featuring Casey Veggies & Mac Miller)	2012		Lap of Lux
"The Vision" (Jet Life featuring Trademark da Skydiver & Young Roddy)	2012		Jet World Order 2
"Intro" (Wiz Khalifa)	2012		O.N.I.F.C.
"Escobar" (Young Jeezy)	2012		It's tha World
"Chun Li" (Wale featuring Nipsey Hussle)	2012		Folarin
"Three 60" (Curren$y featuring Juicy J)	2013		New Jet City
"F.A.M.E." (Freddie Gibbs featuring Daz Dillinger & Spice 1)	2013		ESGN
"No Sleep Gang" (Crooked I)	2013		Apex Predator
"Bossed Up" (HBK Gang featuring Iamsu! & P-Lo)	2013		Gang Forever
"Brodee Bro" (Dizzy Wright featuring Capo)	2013		The Golden Age
"I'm Leanin (Intro)" (Meek Mill featuring Travis Scott, Birdman & Diddy)	2013		Dreamchasers 3
"Money Ain't No Issue" (Meek Mill featuring Future & Fabolous)	2013		Dreamchasers 3
"On Now" (Snow Tha Product featuring Trae Tha Truth)	2013		Good Nights & Bad Mornings 2: The Hangover
"Wit It" (Chevy Woods)	2013		GangLand 2
"Crazy Sex" (R. Kelly)	2013	R. Kelly	Black Panties
"Wood & Leather (Whenever)" (Ty Dolla $ign featuring Big TC & Pops)	2014		Beach House EP
"White Girl" (Shy Glizzy)	2014		Young Jefe
"Pass Off" (Smoke DZA featuring Ty Dolla $ign & Bluntsmoker)	2014		Dream. Zone. Achieve
"Ready for 'Em" (Lil Durk)	2014		Signed To The Streets 2
"Keep It G, Pt. II" (Joey Fatts featuring A$AP Rocky)	2014		Chipper Jones Vol. 3
"Black Eskimo" (Jeezy)	2014	Johnny Juliano	Seen It All: The Autobiography
"Don't Worry" (PARTYNEXTDOOR featuring Ca$h Out)	2014	YeX	PNDCOLOURS
"Big Daddy" (Nicki Minaj featuring Meek Mill)	2014	Johnny Juliano & Yung Exclusive	The Pinkprint
"I Got the Juice" (Meek Mill)	2015	Yung Exclusive	Dreams Worth More Than Money
"Vice City" (Jay Rock featuring Black Hippy)	2015	Yung Exclusive	90059
"My Place" (Gerald Walker)	2015		Target
"Back On The Bullshyt" (2 Chainz featuring Lil Wayne)	2016		Felt Like Cappin
"untitled 02 | 06.23.2014." (Kendrick Lamar)	2016	Yung Exclusive	untitled unmastered
"Headaches & Migraines" (Mac Miller featuring Dave East)	2016		Smoke Till I'm Dead
"Grammys" (Drake featuring Future)	2016	40, Southside & Yung Exclusive	Views
"Coolaid Man" (Snoop Dogg)	2016	Cubeatz	Coolaid
"Affiliated" (Snoop Dogg featuring Trick Trick)	2016		Coolaid
"By Any Means" (ScHoolboy Q)	2016	Yung Exclusive	Blank Face LP
"Overtime" (ScHoolboy Q featuring Miguel & Justine Skye)	2016	Yung Exclusive & Frank Dukes	Blank Face LP
"See What You On" (Dreezy)	2016	OZ	No Hard Feelings
"through the late night" (Travis Scott featuring Kid Cudi)	2016	Cubeatz	Birds in the Trap Sing McKnight
"Type of Time" (Dave East)	2016		Kairi Chanel
"Can't Ignore" (Dave East featuring 2 Chainz)	2016		Kairi Chanel
"Slow Down" (Dave East featuring Jazzy Amra)	2016		Kairi Chanel
"In a Minute / In House" (DRAM)	2016	Yung Exclusive	Big Baby D.R.A.M.
"Good Thang" (DRAM)	2016	Cubeatz	Big Baby D.R.A.M.
"London Town" (A$AP Mob featuring A$AP Rocky, A$AP Ant & Playboi Carti)	2016		Cozy Tapes Vol. 1: Friends
"Deadz" (Migos featuring 2 Chainz)	2017		Culture
"God" (Kendrick Lamar)	2017	Ricci Riera, Sounwave, DJ Dahi, Bēkon & Anthony Tiffith	Damn
"The Other Side" (Dizzee Rascal)	2017	Dizzee Rascal	Raskit
"Bop N Keep It Dippin" (Dizzee Rascal)	2017	Dizzee Rascal	Raskit
"She Knows What She Wants" (Dizzee Rascal)	2017	Dizzee Rascal	Raskit
"Dummy" (Dizzee Rascal)	2017	Dizzee Rascal	Raskit
"Man of the Hour" (Dizzee Rascal)	2017	Dizzee Rascal	Raskit
"Where U From" (Huncho Jack)	2017	Cubeatz	Huncho Jack, Jack Huncho
"Long Gone" (Juice Wrld)	2018		Goodbye & Good Riddance
"Open It Up" (Migos)	2018		Culture II
"Big Shot" (Kendrick Lamar & Travis Scott)	2018	Cubeatz and Sounwave	Black Panther: The Album
"5X" (Don Toliver)	2021	Mike Dean	Life of a Don
"Sanjuro" (Denzel Curry featuring 454)	2022		Melt My Eyez See Your Future
