= On Your Side (Gerald Walker album) =

Mixtape by Cardo and Gerald Walker
- Released: May 6, 2011
- Genre: Hip hop
- Length: 53:01
- Labels: Real Monstas Music Group; One Step at a Time Music
- Producers: Cardo; Sledgren

Cardo and Gerald Walker chronology
| A Gerald Walker Christmas EP (2010) | On Your Side (2011) | The Other Half of Letting Go (2011) |

On Your Side is Gerald Walker's third official mixtape and his first collaborative release with Wiz Khalifa's and Taylor Gang Records producer, Cardo.

== Background ==
The mixtape includes 14 original tracks and is entirely produced by Cardo and Sledgren of the Taylor Gang. Features and appearances included rappers Trae The Truth, Rockie Fresh, EL Prez and Bryant Stewart. On Your Side was created as an EP. Later the artist decided to release it as a free mixtape. On April 1, the first song in support of On Your Side titled "We've Got a Situation on our Hands" was leaked onto the internet. However, the lead single "We Don't Give a F**K" wasn't leaked until April 8 on XXL Magazine. The final single titled "Money On The Dresser" which features, Trae the Truth, was leaked May 5, 2011. The mixtape was produced by Real Monstas Music Group and released on One Step at a Time Music on May 6, 2011, via Twitter.

== Track listing ==
| No. | Title | Producer | Length |
|---|---|---|---|
| 1. | "Introduction" | Sledgren | 1:21 |
| 2. | "Goodnight" | Cardo | 3:50 |
| 3. | "Follow Your Dreams, Forget The Scene" | Cardo | 3:48 |
| 4. | "We Don't Give a F**k" | Cardo; Sledgren | 3:18 |
| 5. | "Highspeed" | Cardo | 3:44 |
| 6. | "Circles" (featuring El Prez, Bryant Stewart & Taylor Kaye) | Cardo | 4:46 |
| 7. | "Here's Everything I've Always Meant To Say" | Cardo | 4:28 |
| 8. | "I Hope I Don't Fall In Love With Her..." | Cardo | 3:54 |
| 9. | "Money On The Dresser" (featuring Trae The Truth) | Sledgren | 4:02 |
| 10. | "Miserable At Best" (featuring Rockie Fresh) | Cardo | 3:07 |
| 11. | "Dro By The Pound" | Cardo | 4:51 |
| 12. | "What You Want" | Sledgren | 3:33 |
| 13. | "Become What You Hate" | Cardo | 4:02 |
| 14. | "On Your Side" | Cardo | 4:29 |

== Credits ==
- Gerald Walker (Vocals)
- Cardo (Production)
- Sledgren (Production)

== Production ==
- Producers: Ray Johnson, Gerald Walker, Edward Murray
- Features: Donald Pullen, Frazier Thompson, El Prez, Bryant Stewart, Taylor Kane
- Executive producers: Sascha Stone, Ronald La Tour, Edward Murray, Gerald Walker & Mohammad Shah
- Recording director: Barron 'Slot-A' Bollar
- Engineer: Jordan Regester
- Mixing: Barron 'Slot-A' Bollar
- Marketing: ScoreMore Shows
- Art direction: 3rd ID Clothing
- Video Direction: Think Ahead Productions
