= Seen It All: The Autobiography =

Studio album by Jeezy
- Released: September 2, 2014
- Genre: Hip hop
- Length: 44:26
- Labels: 8732; CTE; Def Jam
- Producers: Black Metaphor; Cardo; Childish Major; Don Cannon; Drumma Boy; Frank Dukes; Hollywood Hot Sauce; Johnny Juliano; Ke'noe; Lyle LeDuff; Mike Will Made It; No I.D.; P-Nasty; Tony Rey; Trakmatik; Will-A-Fool

Jeezy chronology
TM103 Hustlerz Ambition (2011)	Seen It All: The Autobiography (2014)	Church in These Streets (2015)

Singles from Seen It All: The Autobiography
- 1. "Me OK" Released: May 30, 2014; 2. "Seen It All" Released: July 1, 2014

Seen It All: The Autobiography is the seventh studio album by American rapper Jeezy. The album was released on September 2, 2014, through CTE World and Def Jam Recordings. The production was handled by several Southern hip hop producers, namely Drumma Boy, Mike Will Made It and Childish Major, among others. It features guest appearances from Jay-Z, Future, Rick Ross, The Game, Lil Boosie, August Alsina and Akon.

Seen It All: The Autobiography was supported by two singles, "Me OK" and "Seen It All". The album received generally positive reviews from critics. It debuted at number two on the US Billboard 200 selling 121,000 copies in its first week.

== Background ==
On December 12, 2012, Jeezy released his twelfth mixtape, titled It's tha World. The second single "R.I.P." was released in February 2013, and eventually was certified platinum. In August 2013, Jeezy released a compilation mixtape with CTE World artists, Doughboyz Cashout and YG, titled Boss Yo Life Up Gang. Both singles from its mixtape, "My Nigga" by YG and "Mob Life" by Doughboyz Cashout (the former of which was certified platinum by the RIAA). On September 18, 2013, he announced his plans to release his next album soon, saying it will detail deeper into his street origins, revealed that Future, Usher, Ludacris and Don Cannon, would be involved in the album.

Jeezy also spoke about the album, saying: "A lot of y'all know when I came in the game, I pretty much came in the game with my hands behind my back. 'Cause a lot of the shit I'd like to talk about or could've talked about probably would have got me in a lot of trouble. This is probably my first album where I can explain and let niggas know where I stand. In layman's terms, the statute of limitations is over with." On June 30, 2014, Jeezy announced that his fifth studio album would be titled Seen It All and announced it would be released on September 2, 2014. On July 25, 2014, Jeezy revealed the cover art for Seen It All: The Autobiography.

== Singles ==
On October 8, 2013, the album's first promotional single "In My Head" was released. On May 30, 2014, Jeezy released the album's first single "Me OK". On July 1, 2014, he released the second single, the title-track "Seen It All" featuring Jay-Z. On August 4, 2014, the music video for "Me OK", was released. The video was directed by Motion Family and features cameo appearances from Rich Homie Quan, Trey Songz and T.I. On August 22, 2014, the music video was released for "No Tears" featuring Future. The remixed version of the song "Holy Ghost", which was released on September 3, 2014, features Kendrick Lamar and includes an introduction by T. D. Jakes. On September 15, 2014, the music video was released for "Holy Ghost".

== Critical reception ==
Professional ratings
Aggregate scores
Source	Rating
AnyDecentMusic?	6.3/10
Metacritic	70/100
Review scores
Source	Rating
AllMusic	4/5 stars
The A.V. Club	B−
Exclaim!	7/10
HipHopDX	3.5/5
Now	4/5
Pitchfork	6.0/10
RapReviews	6.5/10
Rolling Stone	3.5/5 stars
Slant Magazine	3/5 stars
XXL	4/5

Seen It All: The Autobiography was met with generally positive reviews. At Metacritic, which assigns a normalized rating out of 100 to reviews from mainstream publications, the album received an average score of 70, based on 14 reviews. Aggregator AnyDecentMusic? gave it 6.3 out of 10, based on their assessment of the critical consensus.

Luke Fox of Exclaim! said, "Sure, the usual Jeezy tropes of hustling and encouraging others to also hustle haven't gone anywhere – the rote "Been Getting Money (featuring Akon)" could be plopped on any Jeezy album and no one would notice – but there's a heap of real-life wisdom here, too. The reactionary Jeezy probably got your attention, but the reflective Jeezy is determined to maintain it. He's a rare, diamond-encrusted rapper who still plausibly speaks for the poor." James Rainis of Slant Magazine stated, "On Seen It All, Jeezy proves you don't need to overcome your own one-dimensional lyrical perspective in order to become a trap star: All you need is the right work ethic and a willingness to adapt to whatever craziness the kids are digging these days." Sheldon Pearce of HipHopDX said, "At its very best, Seen It All is a glimpse into how Jeezy can make his living on the back nine in a crowded subgenre with no use for him anymore: By recalling the most chilling details of his drug dealing past with a flashback-like crispness." Roger Krastz of XXL stated, "At this moment in Jeezy's career, he's managed to find a new way to own his lane by staying consistent to what's made him a household name. Seen It All: The Autobiography is a solid offering, and shows growth of Tha Snowman who is 10 years deep in the rap game."

David Jeffries of AllMusic said, "Strange thing is, Jeezy should have worn out his welcome in the land of drug talk by now, and yet everything here feels fresh and inspired, perhaps validating the rapper's pre-release declaration that some lyrics are here because "the statute of limitations is over." Whatever the reason, Seen It All: The Autobiography shakes off all the challenges of Jeezy's lesser releases and finds new inspiration from the same old rap sheet." Jon Caramanica of The New York Times stated, "This is a strong, if unimaginative album – Jeezy is confident in what he's done, and uninterested in tweaking it. He may not drag his words out as alluringly as he once did, but the sternness of his delivery is intact." Clayton Purdom of The A.V. Club said, "Jeezy's career is built on the heartfelt banger, and, after a decade, it's understandable that he's trying to place his unearthly voice in other settings. The fact that those settings don't work turns Seen It All into the very thing it had hoped to avoid becoming: a fussy major-label rap album."

== Commercial performance ==
Seen It All: The Autobiography debuted at number two on the US Billboard 200, with first-week sales of 121,000 copies in the United States. This was nearly a 50% decrease in sales from his last studio album TM:103 Hustlerz Ambition which sold 233,000 copies in its first week. In its second week, it dropped to number six, selling 33,000 copies. In its third week, it dropped to number 14, selling 21,000 copies. In its fourth week, it dropped to number 25, selling 14,000 copies. As of October 2016, the album has sold 342,000 copies in the US.

== Track listing ==
Seen It All: The Autobiography track listing
No.	Title	Writer(s)	Producer(s)	Length
1.	"1/4 Block"	Jay Jenkins; Markus Randle	Childish Major	3:21
2.	"What You Say"	Jenkins; Randle	Childish Major	3:33
3.	"Enough"	Jenkins; Maurice Jordan	Ke'noe	3:54
4.	"Holy Ghost"	Jenkins; Donald Earl Cannon; Lyle LeDuff; Adam King Feeney	Don Cannon; LeDuff; Frank Dukes	4:41
5.	"Me OK"	Jenkins; Christopher Gholson	Drumma Boy	4:47
6.	"Been Getting Money" (featuring Akon)	Jenkins; Randle; Daystar Peterson; Aliaune Thiam	Childish Major	3:37
7.	"Seen It All" (featuring Jay-Z)	Jenkins; Ronald LaTour; Shawn Carter	Cardo	3:27
8.	"Win Is a Win"	Jenkins; Byron Forest II	Black Metaphor	1:39
9.	"Beautiful" (featuring The Game and Rick Ross)	Jenkins; Forest II; Jayceon Taylor; William Roberts	Black Metaphor	5:42
10.	"Beez Like" (featuring Lil Boosie)	Jenkins; Willie Jerome Byrd; Tony Rey; Torrence Hatch	Will-A-Fool; Rey	4:31
11.	"No Tears" (featuring Future)	Jenkins; Michael Len Williams II; Pierre Ramon Slaughter; Nayvadius DeMun Wilburn	Mike Will Made It; P-Nasty	4:24
12.	"How I Did It (Perfection)"	Jenkins; Forest II	Black Metaphor	3:30
Total length:				44:26

Deluxe edition
No.	Title	Writer(s)	Producer(s)	Length
1.	"1/4 Block"	Jenkins; Randle	Childish Major	3:21
2.	"What You Say"	Jenkins; Randle	Childish Major	3:33
3.	"Black Eskimo"	Jenkins; LaTour; John E. Julian, Jr.	Cardo; Johnny Juliano	2:05
4.	"Enough"	Jenkins; Jordan	Ke'noe	3:54
5.	"Holy Ghost"	Jenkins; Cannon; LeDuff; Feeney	Cannon; LeDuff; Frank Dukes	4:41
6.	"Me OK"	Jenkins; Gholson	Drumma Boy	4:27
7.	"4 Zones"	Jenkins; M. Williams II; Slaughter	Mike Will Made It; P-Nasty	4:29
8.	"Been Getting Money" (featuring Akon)	Jenkins; Randle; Thiam	Childish Major	3:37
9.	"Fuck the World" (featuring August Alsina)	Jenkins; Ernest Dion Wilson; Deondre Collins; August Alsina	No I.D.; Trakmatik	3:39
10.	"Seen It All" (featuring Jay-Z)	Jenkins; LaTour; Carter	Cardo	3:27
11.	"Win Is a Win"	Jenkins; Forest II	Black Metaphor	1:39
12.	"Beautiful" (featuring The Game and Rick Ross)	Jenkins; Forest II; Taylor; R. Williams	Black Metaphor	5:42
13.	"Beez Like" (featuring Lil Boosie)	Jenkins; Byrd; Rey; Hatch	Will-A-Fool; Rey	4:31
14.	"No Tears" (featuring Future)	Jenkins; M. Williams II; Slaughter; Wilburn	Mike Will Made It; P-Nasty	4:24
15.	"How I Did It (Perfection)"	Jenkins; Forest II	Black Metaphor	3:30
Total length:				56:39

Best Buy deluxe edition (bonus tracks)
No.	Title	Writer(s)	Producer(s)	Length
16.	"Shady Life" (featuring Kelly Rowland)	Jenkins; Paul Dawson; Kelly Rowland	Hollywood Hot Sauce	4:02
17.	"Addicted" (featuring T.I. and YG)	Jenkins; Randle; Clifford Joseph Harris; Keenon Ray Jackson	Childish Major	3:33

== Charts ==
=== Weekly charts ===
Chart performance for Seen It All: The Autobiography
Chart (2014)	Peak position
Canadian Albums (Billboard)	8
US Billboard 200	2
US Top R&B/Hip-Hop Albums (Billboard)	1

=== Year-end charts ===
2014 year-end chart performance for Seen It All: The Autobiography
Chart (2014)	Position
US Billboard 200	71
US Top R&B/Hip-Hop Albums (Billboard)	18

2015 year-end chart performance for Seen It All: The Autobiography
Chart (2015)	Position
US Top R&B/Hip-Hop Albums (Billboard)	58

== Certifications ==
Certifications for Seen It All: The Autobiography
Region	Certification	Certified units/sales
United States (RIAA)	Gold	500,000^{‡}
^{‡} Sales+streaming figures based on certification alone.
