= Seen It All (Jeezy song) =

Single by Jeezy

Single by Jeezy featuring Jay-Z

from the album Seen It All: The Autobiography
- Released: July 1, 2014
- Recorded: 2013
- Genre: Hip hop
- Length: 3:28
- Label: CTE World; Def Jam
- Songwriter(s): Jay Jenkins; Shawn Carter; Ronald LaTour
- Producer(s): Cardo

Jeezy singles chronology
"Money Can't Buy" (2014)	"Seen It All" (2014)	"GOD" (2015)

Jay-Z singles chronology
"They Don't Love You No More" (2014)	"Seen It All" (2014)	"Pop Style" (2016)

"Seen It All" is a song by American rapper Jeezy, released as the second single from his seventh studio album Seen It All: The Autobiography (2014). It is a hip hop song and it features vocals from fellow rapper Jay-Z and was produced by Cardo.

== Charts ==
=== Weekly charts ===
Chart (2014)	Peak position
US Billboard Hot 100	85
US Hot R&B/Hip-Hop Songs (Billboard)	24

=== Year-end charts ===
Chart (2014)	Position
US Hot R&B/Hip-Hop Songs (Billboard)	87

== Certifications ==
Region	Certification	Certified units/sales
United States (RIAA)	Platinum	1,000,000^{‡}
^{‡} Sales+streaming figures based on certification alone.
