= Papi Chulo (Octavian and Skepta song) =

2020 single by Octavian and Skepta

Single by Octavian and Skepta

from the album Alpha
- Released: 13 March 2020
- Length: 2:41
- Label: Black Butter
- Songwriters: Skepta; Charles Eric Driggers; Octavian; Kevin Andre Price; Kiowa Roukema
- Producers: YoungKio; Grizzly

Octavian singles chronology
"Feel It" (2019)	"Papi Chulo" (2020)

Skepta singles chronology
"Kiss and Tell" (2019)	"Papi Chulo" (2020)	"Waze" (2020)

"Papi Chulo" is a song performed by British rapper and singer-songwriter Octavian and English rapper Skepta. It was released as a single on 13 March 2020 through Black Butter Records. The song peaked at number 37 on the UK Singles Chart.

== Music video ==
A music video to accompany the release of "Papi Chulo" was first released onto YouTube on 13 March 2020. Rappers ASAP Ferg, ASAP Nast, and Michael Phantom all make cameo appearances.

== Charts ==
Chart performance of "Papi Chulo"
Chart (2020)	Peak position
Australia (ARIA)	85
Belgium (Ultratip Bubbling Under Flanders)	14
Canada Hot 100 (Billboard)	99
Ireland (IRMA)	37
Switzerland (Schweizer Hitparade)	66
UK Singles (OCC)	37
UK Hip Hop/R&B (OCC)	21

== Certifications ==
Region	Certification	Certified units/sales
New Zealand (RMNZ)	Platinum	30,000^{‡}
United Kingdom (BPI)	Gold	400,000^{‡}
^{‡} Sales+streaming figures based on certification alone.
