= Gerald Walker =

American rapper and singer

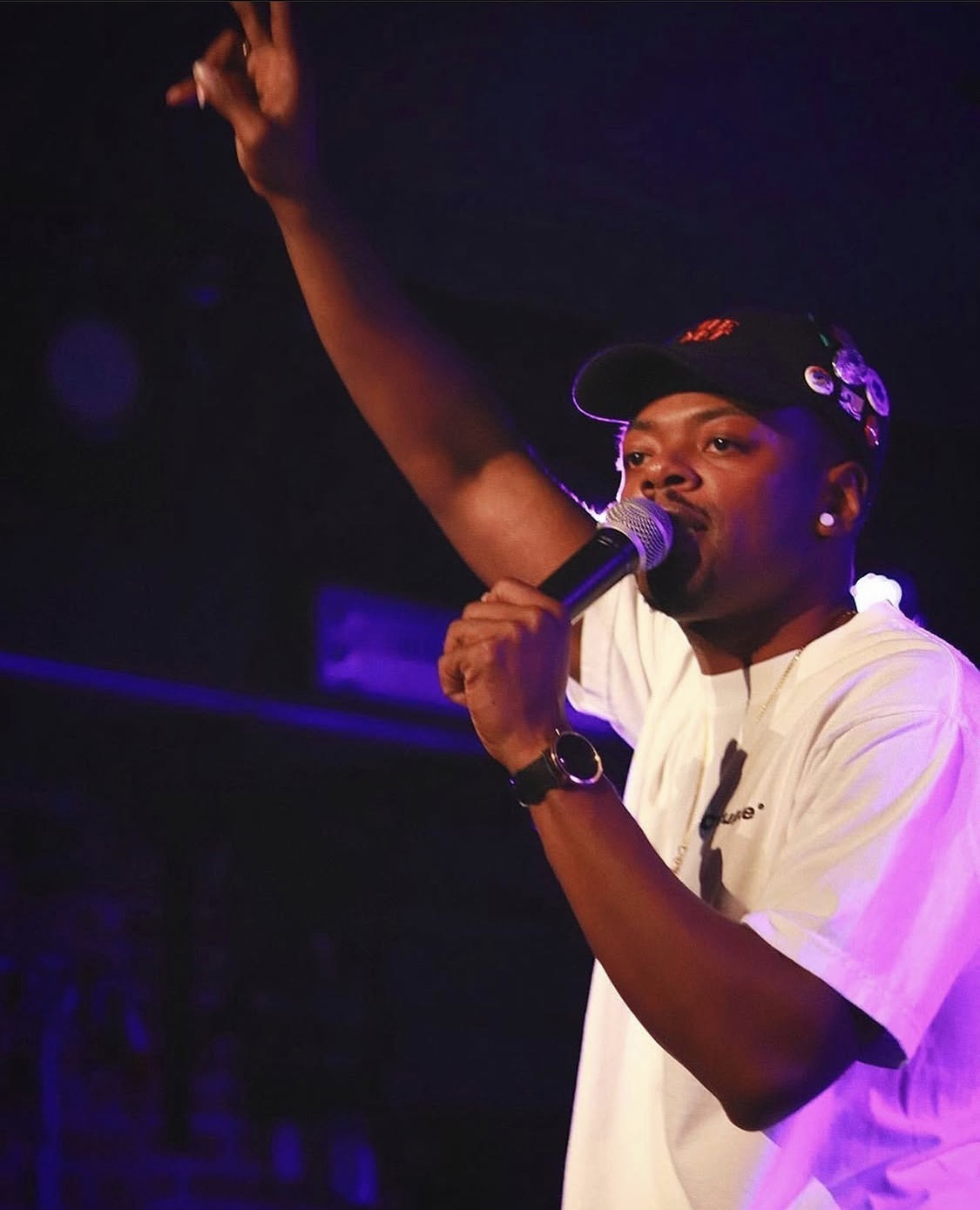
- Gerald Walker performing during a live show in New York City.

Background information
- Born: Gerald Joshua Walker; July 14, 1987 (age 39); Chicago, Illinois, U.S.
- Origin: Milwaukee, Wisconsin, U.S.
- Genres: Hip-hop; R&B; hip-hop soul
- Occupations: Rapper; singer; songwriter; record producer
- Years active: 2007–present
- Labels: Virgin Music Group; Sentric; Blue Collar Gang
- Website: walkwithgerald.com

Gerald Joshua Walker (born July 14, 1987), is an American rapper and singer from Chicago, Illinois. He signed to fellow Midwestern rapper Stalley's label, Blue Collar Gang in 2018. Walker is known for his soul influenced style of hip-hop, and his association with rappers Layzie Bone of Bone Thugs-N-Harmony, Yelawolf, Skyzoo and Rockie Fresh, as well as record producer Cardo.

== Musical career ==
=== 1987–2010: Early life and career beginnings ===
Walker was born in Chicago, Illinois, and grew up in Bellwood and Matteson. His father, a college professor and Air Force veteran was African-American, while his mother, an executive Assistant at the Proviso Leyden Council, in Maywood, Illinois, is of African-American descent. When he was five years old, Walker's parents separated; this event would have a significant effect on Walker's personality and consequently his music. Walker attended Riverside University High School, and took classes at Columbia College Chicago during the summer.

It was the summer after his high school graduation that Walker first began rapping, inspired by hip-hop groups such as Little Brother and Bone Thugs-n-Harmony". He moved to Chicago to pursue a career in television while networking with other emerging artist within the city's music scene. In September 2009 Walker released his debut mixtape, "Evening Out With Your Girlfriend".

In 2010 Gerald Walker released his second official mixtape, I Remember When This All Meant Something.... The mixtape consist of fifteen original tracks including three hidden bonus songs featuring production from, Symbolyc One, producer of Kanye West's 2010 single Power.

Gerald Walker released his first Christmas-themed album, A Gerald Walker Christmas, which included three original and two traditional songs re-arranged with up-tempo beats in hip-hop-style.

=== 2011–2012: Believers Never Die... ===
In January 2011, Gerald Walker purchased a leased hip-hop instrumental from Dallas Texas, based and Taylor Gang producer, Cardo. Walker then wrote, recorded and released the song entitled, "Here's Everything I've Always Meant to Say" as free download online. After pressure from Walker's friends he reluctantly emailed the finished song to Cardo, who, to his surprise, was impressed and the two began demoing songs for amusement. In April 2011, Walker announced that he would be touring with Shady/Interscope Recording artist Yelawolf. In May 2011, while on tour Walker released his third official mixtape, On Your Side, a collaboration effort with producer, Cardo.

In June, Gerald Walker was featured on MTV's RapFix Live broadcast, where he appeared with other mainstream and popular artist including Lloyd Banks, Maino and Jim Jones. In September, Walker released his fourth mixtape The Other Half of Letting Go, in collaboration with popular street-wear brand Diamond Supply. The mixtape quickly catapulted Walker as an emerging artist in the hip-hop community. Amber McKynzie of XXL Magazine wrote: "The mixtape might be titled The Other Half of Letting Go, but Gerald Walker is shaping up to be an artist that hip-hop shouldn't let go unnoticed." The mixtape was the only hip-hop release featured in the Shepherd Express "2011 Essential Albums of the Year" list.

In November, The Source debuted the track list and cover art to Gerald Walker's second Christmas album It's Christmastime Again, Gerald Walker. Originally slated as a re-release to his debut Christmas album he re-recorded and released seven original songs. That marked Gerald Walker's third release in 2011 – all within' a six-month time period.

=== 2013–2017: Target ===
In May 2013, after multiple hints and hashtags with the word Target via his Twitter Walker tweeted: "Everything's Done. New Chapter Begins. My debut album "Target" coming this Fall! Confirming his independent label debut's title. On February 3, 2014, Gerald Walker announced The Target Practice Tour, a 16 date North American tour beginning on February 8, 2014, through the end of April 2014. The tour was accompanied by a mixtape release entitled, "Yesterday You Said Tomorrow (A Prelude to TARGET)". The release featured a collection of demo's that didn't make the final TARGET release.

In June 2015, Walker announced his book Target: 52 Weeks to Completing My Album, a memoir about his life featuring stories and anecdotes simultaneously released with the album. On June 5, 2015, Walker released the first single from Target titled "No Heart Feelings" featuring The Family. On August 25, 2015, the second single from Target titled "Follow Through" was released. Target was also supported by two tours. The first being the TARGET Listening Sessions, a 10 date, 8 city album listening and concert tour. In May 2016 Walker embarked a 15 date international tour supporting the album titled the TARGET World Tour.

=== Since 2018: Blue Collar Gang ===
In July 2018, Walker in an interview with Billboard announced a music partnership with rapper Stalley's Blue Collar Gang imprint. On December 7, 2018, Walker released his third studio EP titled People Tell Themselves Anything to Justify Everything. In February 2019, ESPN's First Take featured Walker's "Time" single from People Tell Themselves Anything to Justify Everything as the show's theme song. On March 8, 2019, Walker released his fourth studio EP titled The Little Foxes, That Spoil The Vines.

On August 1, 2019, Walker debuted his single and music video " Win Streak" from his forthcoming EP "And Only a Few Ever Find It". In November 2019, Walker also embarked on Stalley's 'The Head Trip Tour', opening along with fellow label mates, LifeDutchee.

== Business ventures ==
According to VIBE magazine in December 2019 Walker launched a new business venture, Ayọ Fragrance + Design Studios. The company focuses on unisex fragrances and scented candles.

== Discography ==
=== Studio albums ===
List of albums, with selected details
Title	Album details
TARGET	Released: 2015; Label: INgrooves / OSAT Music; Formats: Digital download

=== Books ===
- 2016: TARGET Practice: 52 Weeks to Completing My Album

=== Albums and mixtapes ===
- 2010: I Remember When This All Meant Something...
- 2010: A Gerald Walker Christmas EP
- 2011: On Your Side
- 2011: The Other Half of Letting Go
- 2011: It's Christmastime Again, Gerald Walker
- 2012: Believers Never Die
- 2012: On Your Side Part Deux (2012)
- 2012: Gerald Walker Christmas Collection Vol. 1 (2012)
- 2014: "Yesterday You Said Tomorrow"
- 2015: Target
- 2017: Target: Redux
- 2018: People Tell Themselves Anything to Justify Everything
- 2019: The Little Foxes, That Spoil the Vines
- 2019: And Only a Few Ever Find It
- 2020: The World Will Spin Without You
- 2020: What Happened In Between...

== Magazines and features ==
- URB (March 2008)
- Stuck Magazine (2007)
- Feed Me Cool Shit Magazine (2006)
- Annex Magazine (2013)
- Newsome WolfTracks newspaper (2013)
