= I Remember When This All Meant Something... =

Mixtape by Gerald Walker
- Released: July 16, 2010
- Genre: Hip hop
- Length: 51:14
- Label: Bang Hot Productions/ One Step at a Time Music Recordings

Gerald Walker chronology
| Evening Out With Your Girlfriend (2009) | I Remember When This All Meant Something... (2010) | A Gerald Walker Christmas EP (2010) |

Singles from I Remember When This All Meant Something...
- 1. "Silent" Released: May 26, 2010

Professional ratings
Review scores
| Source | Rating |
|---|---|
| Okayplayer | (not rated) |
| Whats in My Headphone | (favorable) |

I Remember When This All Meant Something... is the second official mixtape from Milwaukee, Wisconsin rapper Gerald Walker. All of the songs, except for 4 (Not At All, Wait A Minute, Gotta Work & High), are featureless. Other popular songs on the mixtape are Silent and The Journey. Gerald Walker also serves as the executive producer for the majority of the mixtape with help from Barron 'Slot-A' Bollar.

== Track listing ==
| No. | Title | Performer(s) | Length |
|---|---|---|---|
| 1. | "Everything People Say I Am, That's What I'm Not" | Gerald Walker | 2:24 |
| 2. | "I Remember When This All Meant Something (Part 1)" | Gerald Walker | 4:07 |
| 3. | "The Journey" | Gerald Walker | 4:20 |
| 4. | "Not At All" | Gerald Walker, Bryant Stewart | 3:48 |
| 5. | "Ready to Go" | Gerald Walker | 3:33 |
| 6. | "Wait a Minute [Ode to the Lil Homies]" | Gerald Walker, Add-2, Slot-A | 4:21 |
| 7. | "Selah (Ups & Downs)" | Gerald Walker | 2:49 |
| 8. | "Silent" | Gerald Walker | 4:22 |
| 9. | "Gotta Work" | Gerald Walker, Mr. Robotic | 3:29 |
| 10. | "We Used to Talk for Hours On End & Now It's Like We Never Knew Each Other..." | Gerald Walker | 3:25 |
| 11. | "High" | Gerald Walker, Slot-A, Mr. Robotic, Add-2 | 4:23 |
| 12. | "I'm Gonna Remember That You Are My Friend, and Fall Asleep on Your Floor..." | Gerald Walker | 3:16 |
| 13. | "You Can Make It If You Try" | Gerald Walker | 3:25 |
| 14. | "I Remember When This All Meant Something (Part 2)" | Gerald Walker | 2:10 |
| 15. | "The Last Something That Meant Anything" | Gerald Walker | 4:09 |

== Production credits ==
- Executive Producer: Barron 'Slot-A' Bollar
- Mixing engineer: Barron 'Slot-A' Bollar
- Executive Producer: Gerald Walker
- Tracking engineer: Gerald Walker

== Song Notes ==
- I'm Gonna Remember That You Are My Friend, And Fall Asleep On Your Floor are lyrics from Chicago, Illinois punk rock band The Lawrence Arms song "My Boatless Booze Cruise" from the album Apathy and Exhaustion
- The mixtape cover art is inspired by Los Angeles painter and graphic designer Luke Chueh's "The Explosion."
- The song title "Everything People Say That I Am, That's What I'm Not" is inspired by English indie rock band Arctic Monkeys' debut album Whatever People Say I Am, That's What I'm Not.
