= A Gerald Walker Christmas EP =

EP by Gerald Walker
- Released: December 20, 2010
- Recorded: November–December 2010
- Genre: Christmas, hip-hop
- Length: 12.3 min (original)
- Label: One Step at a Time Music Recordings
- Producer: Gerald Walker, Chris Cobb, Kuddie Fresh, Lillian Duermier, Ebony Haynes, Barron Bollar, Chris Neuman, Benjamin Mandel

Gerald Walker chronology
I Remember When This All Meant Something... (2010)	A Gerald Walker Christmas EP (2010)	On Your Side (2011)

Singles from A Gerald Walker Christmas EP
- 1. "Keep Me Going" Released: December 2010

A Gerald Walker Christmas is the first Christmas album by American rapper Gerald Walker, released by One Step at a Time Music on December 20, 2010, in the United States.

== Background ==
The album is inspired by Charles M. Schulz's "A Charlie Brown Christmas" and contains two traditional Christmas songs and three original songs. Most of them are re-arranged with up-tempo beats in hip-hop-style. The title track, "A Gerald Walker Christmas", uses samples from Schulz's aforementioned work. The album was recorded in Fall 2010 in the United States, but Walker also stated during an interview with, Ynotmydream.net, that parts of the album were demoed in Chicago during the recording of I Remember When This All Meant Something.... In the same interview Walker revealed: I've had the music for over a year now, but didn't know what I wanted to do with it. However, I knew that I wanted to knock it out and didn't want another year pass before doing so.

== Singles ==
The song "Keep Me Going" was first released on December 17, 2010, for promotion of the album.

== Track listing ==
1. "Prelude" (Vince Guaraldi., Gerald Walker) – 1:47
2. "A Gerald Walker Christmas" (G. Walker, C. Cobb,) – 4:05
3. "Keep Me Going" (G. Walker, C. Cobb) – 3:30
4. "Christmas Isn't Just a Day, you know, It's a Frame of Mind" (G. Walker, K. Fresh,) – 2:01
5. "Walker of The Bells (Bonus)" (G. Walker) – 0:52

== Credits ==
- Writers: Gerald Walker
- Producers: Chris Cobb, Gerald Walker, Kuddie Fresh
- Executive producers: Gerald Walker
- Engineer: Gerald Walker
- Mixing: Gerald Walker
- A&R: Barron Bollar
- Recording director: Barron 'Slot-A' Bollar
- Marketing: One Step at a Time Music, Inc
- Art direction: Lillian Duermier
- Video direction: Chris Neuman
