= The Smiths Is Dead =

1996 compilation album by various artists

Compilation album by Various artists
- Released: 1996
- Genre: Alternative rock
- Length: 42:17
- Label: Small
- Producer: Christian Fevret for Les Inrockuptibles

Professional ratings
Review scores
Source	Rating
Allmusic	link

The Smiths Is Dead is a tribute album to the 1980s English alternative rock band the Smiths, released in 1996 to celebrate the 10th anniversary of 1986's The Queen Is Dead, featuring the same tracks in the same running order. It was compiled by the French cultural magazine Les Inrockuptibles. The album was released at the height of the Britpop era and contained covers by popular Britpop acts such as Supergrass, the Divine Comedy and the Boo Radleys.

The cover is of David Bradley in a promotional shot for the 1969 film adaptation of A Kestrel for a Knave, entitled Kes.

== Track listing ==
All tracks are written by Morrissey/Marr

No.	Title	Cover artist	Length
1.	"The Queen Is Dead"	The Boo Radleys	5:33
2.	"Frankly, Mr. Shankly"	The High Llamas	3:35
3.	"I Know It's Over"	The Trash Can Sinatras	6:16
4.	"Never Had No One Ever"	Billy Bragg	3:36
5.	"Cemetry Gates"	The Frank and Walters	4:15
6.	"Bigmouth Strikes Again"	Placebo	3:51
7.	"The Boy with the Thorn in His Side"	Bis	3:21
8.	"Vicar in a Tutu"	Therapy?	2:42
9.	"There Is a Light That Never Goes Out"	The Divine Comedy	5:18
10.	"Some Girls Are Bigger Than Others"	Supergrass	3:35
