= Best... I =

Greatest hits album by the Smiths
- Released: August 17, 1992
- Recorded: 1983–1987
- Genres: Alternative rock, indie pop, new wave
- Length: 45:09
- Label: WEA
- Producer: Various (see main text)

The Smiths chronology
The Peel Sessions (1988)	Best... I (1992)	...Best II (1992)

Alternative cover
- US cover of Best... I

Professional ratings
Review scores
Source	Rating
AllMusic	link
The Encyclopedia of Popular Music	3/5 stars

Best... I is a compilation album by the Smiths. It was released in August 1992 by the new owner of their back catalogue, WEA (Sire Records in the United States). It reached number one on the UK Albums Chart; it reached No. 139 on the US Billboard 200. Warner UK used a photograph taken by actor Dennis Hopper titled "Biker Couple, 1961" (top photo) for the artwork of the two 1992 "best of" compilations by The Smiths.

== Background ==
WEA (now the Warner Music Group) had acquired the entire Smiths back catalogue in early 1992. Along with the re-release of the eight original albums (the four studio albums, the Rank live album and the three compilation albums issued while the band were still active), they immediately set to work compiling a 'best of' collection in two volumes. It was the first time a regular best of compilation had ever been made of The Smiths' material and the album effortlessly reached the top of the British charts. The British press had doubts about sell-out and low track selection coherence.

The material is more or less picked and sequenced at random, and consists of both singles and album cuts. It was followed later the same year by its sibling, ...Best II. The first spin-off single, a re-release of "This Charming Man", reached No. 8 in the singles chart, the highest position a Smiths single had ever reached. A second single promoting Best... I, an edited re-release of "How Soon Is Now?", got to No. 16 (the uncut version is featured on the compilation).

=== Cover ===
The UK and European release of the record featured the left half of a biker couple photograph by Dennis Hopper from 1961 entitled 'Biker Couple' on its sleeve, with ...Best II completing the picture; the U.S. sleeve was designed by singer Morrissey and features Richard Davalos, co-star of East of Eden.

== Track listing ==
All tracks written by Morrissey and Johnny Marr.

No.	Title	Release(s)	Length
1.	"This Charming Man"	Single A-side; The Smiths	2:43
2.	"William, It Was Really Nothing"	1984 single Hatful of Hollow; Louder Than Bombs	2:09
3.	"What Difference Does It Make? (Album version)"	The Smiths	3:51
4.	"Stop Me If You Think You've Heard This One Before"	Strangeways, Here We Come	3:34
5.	"Girlfriend in a Coma"	Strangeways, Here We Come	2:02
6.	"Half a Person"	Single B-side of "Shoplifters of The World Unite"; The World Won't Listen; Louder Than Bombs	3:36
7.	"Rubber Ring"	Single B-side of "The Boy with the Thorn in His Side"	3:48
8.	"How Soon Is Now?"	Hatful of Hollow	6:46
9.	"Hand in Glove (Album version)"	The Smiths	3:25
10.	"Shoplifters of the World Unite"	1987 single The World Won't Listen; Louder Than Bombs	2:58
11.	"Sheila Take a Bow"	1987 single Louder Than Bombs	2:42
12.	"Some Girls Are Bigger Than Others"	The Queen Is Dead	3:18
13.	"Panic"	1986 single The World Won't Listen; Louder Than Bombs	2:20
14.	"Please, Please, Please, Let Me Get What I Want"	Single B-side of "William, It Was Really Nothing"; Hatful of Hollow; Louder Than Bombs	1:54

== Personnel ==
- Morrissey – vocals
- Johnny Marr – guitars, harmonica, mandolins on "Please, Please, Please Let Me Get What I Want"
- Andy Rourke – bass guitar
- Mike Joyce – drums
- Craig Gannon – rhythm guitar on "Half a Person" and "Panic"

=== Additional musicians ===
- John Porter – slide guitar on "Sheila Take a Bow"
- Stephen Street – synthesized string arrangements on "Girlfriend in a Coma".

=== Production ===
- John Porter – producer (A1-A3, B1, B6-B7)
- Johnny Marr, Morrissey and Street – producers (A4-A6, B4)
- Morrissey and Marr – producers (A7, B5)
- The Smiths – producers (B2)
- Johnny Marr – producer (B3)

== Charts ==
=== Weekly charts ===
Weekly chart performance
Chart (1992)	Peak position
Australian Albums (ARIA)	64
Canada Top Albums/CDs (RPM)	36
Dutch Albums (Album Top 100)	74
New Zealand Albums (RMNZ)	15
Norwegian Albums (VG-lista)	35
Swedish Albums (Sverigetopplistan)	45
UK Albums (Official Charts)	1
US Billboard 200	139

Weekly chart performance
Chart (2000)	Peak position
Irish Albums (IRMA)	52

Weekly chart performance
Chart (2014)	Peak position
Italian Albums (FIMI)	97

Weekly chart performance
Chart (2026)	Peak position
Belgian Albums (Ultratop Flanders)	187
Belgian Albums (Ultratop Wallonia)	65
Croatian International Albums (HDU)	5
Greek Albums (IFPI)	75
Hungarian Physical Albums (MAHASZ)	6

=== Monthly charts ===
Monthly chart performance
Chart (2026)	Position
Croatian International Vinyl Albums (HDU)	6

== Certifications and sales ==
Certifications and sales for Best... I
Region	Certification	Certified units/sales
United Kingdom (BPI)	Gold	100,000^{^}
United States	—	432,907
^{^} Shipments figures based on certification alone.
