= Hetty King =

English music hall performer (1883–1972)

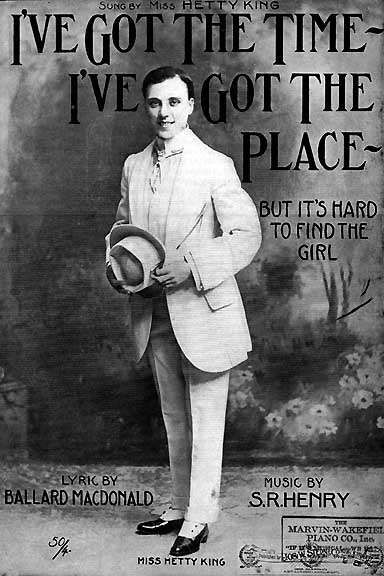
- 1910 sheet music cover
- Born: Winifred Emms; 21 April 1883; New Brighton, Cheshire, England
- Died: 28 September 1972 (aged 89); Wimbledon, London, England
- Occupation: Music hall male impersonator
- Spouses: Ernie Lotinga (1901); Alexander William Lamond (1918)

Winifred Emms (4 April 1883 – 28 September 1972), best known by her stage name Hetty King, was an English entertainer who performed in the music halls as a male impersonator over some 70 years.

== Early life ==
She was born in New Brighton, Cheshire, where her itinerant family were living temporarily; they were usually based in Manchester. Her father, William Emms (1856–1954), was a comedian and musician who performed as Billy King and ran Uncle Billy's Minstrels, a troupe who constantly travelled around the country with a portable theatre and caravans. As a child, she began appearing in her father's shows, imitating popular performers of the day. She adopted the name Hetty King when she first appeared on the stage of the Shoreditch Theatre, at the age of six.

== Career ==
At the age of 10, King won a contest which offered a season’s work at Blackpool Pier. King started performing as a solo act in music halls in around 1902, (though she appeared as a solo act at the Argyle Theatre Birkenhead as early as December 1898 billed as a vocalist and dancer) doing impersonations of such stars as Gus Elen and Vesta Victoria. In her early career, she perfected an impression of the successful lion comique, George Lashwood. For the week commencing 10 December 1904, she topped the programme at the newly opened (for 10 days) Empire Theatre in Ashton-under-Lyne, billed as "The Society Gem". It was her first of many appearances at this theatre, part of W. H. Broadhead's theatre circuit.

She started appearing regularly as a male impersonator from 1905, when she starred in Dick Whittington at the Kennington Theatre. Thereafter she appeared regularly, dressed as a "swell". In 1907, King travelled to the United States with the Canadian comedian R. G. Knowles, and broke all records at the New York Theatre, performing songs including "I Want a Gibson Girl" and "When I Get Back To Piccadilly". After returning to England, she began performing the song "Ship Ahoy! (All the Nice Girls Love a Sailor)", written by Bennett Scott and A. J. Mills. She said that she first sang it at the Liverpool Empire in 1908, but it did not become successful until 1909, when it became popular and, towards the end of the year, was described as the greatest pantomime hit for four years. It became her signature song, which she continued to perform throughout her career.

Her career spanned both World Wars, when she performed in the uniform of either a soldier or a sailor. In the First World War, she toured in France and Belgium, entertaining the troops. In 1915, she appeared with her husband, Ernest Lotinga, at a fundraiser for The Evening News Prisoners of War Fund, staged at the Prince of Wales Hotel in Hampton Court. The gathering included some 30 wounded soldiers. All the artists gave their services for free. In 1916, her act included "Songs the Soldiers Sing", in which she sang some of the less ribald songs invented by soldiers in the trenches.

By around 1930, King was reputedly the highest-paid music hall star in the world. Much of her success was due to her painstaking observation of the mannerisms of such men as sailors and soldiers. She learned how to march, salute, light a pipe, and swing a kitbag of the right weight, so as to give the correct appearance of a man, while always ensuring that "her femininity shone through, sometimes winking at the audience as if to let them in on the subterfuge". King also played the "principal boy" in many pantomimes, and appeared on BBC Radio, being described in 1933 as the "most virile of male impersonators... [a] broadcasting favourite of long standing."

King continued to entertain until the end of her life, and regularly performed in the United States, Australia and South Africa. By the late 1930s, she was seen as a nostalgia act. She toured Britain from 1948 as one of the veteran music hall performers in the show Thanks for the Memory produced by Don Ross. King was known for her insistence on receiving top billing, and was described as "stubborn, uncompromising and a legend in the business for cantankerous and temperamental behaviour, [who] refused to consider any other type of performance as fashions changed."

== Personal life and death ==
In 1901, she married actor and writer Ernie Lotinga (1876–1951), who was born in Sunderland. He was a music hall comedian, singer and theatre proprietor, billed as Dan Roe from 1898, who appeared in films in the 1920s and 1930s, often as the comic character PC Jimmy Josser. They had one child and divorced in 1917, a decree nisi being granted on 16 March by Sir Samuel Evans on the grounds of King's misconduct with the vaudeville artist and actor Jack Norworth. The divorce was not contested. Her second marriage, in 1918, was to Alexander Lamond.

King's half-sister, Olive Emms, was also an actress, who often travelled with her and acted as her dresser; her half-brother, Harold Emms, wrote many of King's songs with his French wife, Francine.

King died in Wimbledon, London, in 1972, aged 89, and was cremated at Golders Green Crematorium.

== Commemoration ==
On 8 November 2010 a commemorative blue plaque was erected to King at her last residence in Wimbledon by the theatre charity The Music Hall Guild of Great Britain and America.

== Songs recorded ==
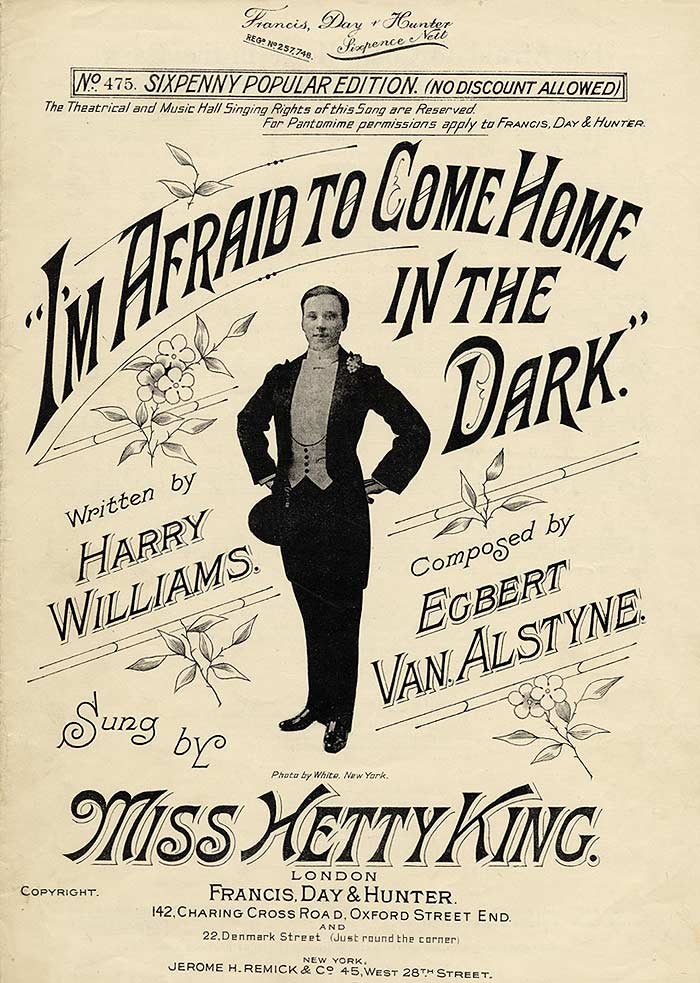
1907 sheet music cover

- "Ship Ahoy! (All the Nice Girls Love a Sailor)"
- "Piccadilly"
- "Tell her the Old, Old Story"
- "Down by the Riverside"
- "I'm Going Away"
- "Now I'm Home Again"
- "Bye Bye Bachelor Days"
- "Love 'em and Leave 'em Alone"
- "Fill 'em up"
- "Oh Girls, why do you Love the Soldiers"
- "What Does A Sailor Care?"
- "I'm Afraid to Come Home in the Dark"

== Film ==
Hetty King appeared in the movie Lilacs in the Spring (1954), which was directed by Herbert Wilcox and starred Anna Neagle and Errol Flynn. Towards the end of her career, aged 87, she appeared in a film entitled Hetty King – Performer (1970).
