= Dynamite Daze =

Studio album by Kevin Coyne
- Released: 1978
- Studio: Alvic, Wimbledon
- Genre: Rock
- Label: Virgin: V2096
- Producer: Kevin Coyne, Bob Ward

Kevin Coyne chronology
Beautiful Extremes (1977)	Dynamite Daze (1978)	Millionaires and Teddy Bears (1979)

Singles from Dynamite Daze
- 1. "Amsterdam / I Really Love You" Released: 1978

Dynamite Daze is a studio album by the rock artist Kevin Coyne. It was released in 1978 by Virgin Records.

== Critical reception ==
Professional ratings
Review scores
Source	Rating
AllMusic	4/5 stars

The Bristol Evening Post called Coyne "a writer and performer of great passion and originality." The Nottingham Evening Post praised the "spongy Paul Wickens accordion work."

== Track listing ==
All tracks composed by Coyne unless otherwise indicated:

Side one

1. "Dynamite Daze" – 2:44
2. "Brothers of Mine" – 4:07
3. "Lunatic" – 4.52 (Tim Rice on piano)
4. "Are We Dreaming" – 3:39 (Paul Wickens on accordion, also composed)
5. "(Take Me Back To) Dear Old Blighty" – 1:27 (Zoot Money on piano; composed by A. J. Mills, Bennett Scott, F. Godfrey)
6. "I Really Live Round Here (False Friends)" – 3:56 (drums and synthesizer by Paul Wickens)
7. "I Am" – 2:21 (from the original poem by John Clare)

Side two

1. "Amsterdam" – 3:00
2. "I Only Want to See You Smile" – 2:31 (Tim Rice on piano)
3. "Juliet and Mark" – 4:46
4. "Woman, Woman, Woman" – 4:06
5. "Cry" – 5:36 (composed by Churchill Kohlman; Zoot Money on electric piano)
6. "Dance of Bourgeoisie" – 2:00 (composed by Coyne and George Money; Zoot Money on electric piano)

== Personnel ==
Musicians

- Kevin Coyne – acoustic guitar and vocals
- Bob Ward – acoustic and electric guitar
- Paul Wickens – drums, congas, minimoog, accordion
- Zoot Money – piano, Fender Rhodes
- Vic Sweeney – drums
- Al James – bass

Technical

- Producers – Kevin Coyne and Bob Ward
- Engineers – Vic Sweeney and Al James
- Executive Producer – Steve Lewis
- Cover photography – Murray Close
- Cover artwork – Peter Knipe
