= Ship Ahoy =

Ship Ahoy or Ship Ahoy! may refer to:

- Ship Ahoy (film), a 1942 American musical-comedy film
- Ship Ahoy (album), a 1973 album by The O'Jays
- "Ship Ahoy! (All the Nice Girls Love a Sailor)", a 1908 English music hall song
- Ship Ahoy! (film), a 1931 Swedish comedy film
