= ...Best II =

- Cover to the standard edition of the album

Greatest hits album by the Smiths
- Released: November 2, 1992
- Recorded: 1983–1987
- Genres: Alternative rock, indie pop
- Length: 52:24
- Label: WEA
- Producer: Various (see main text)

The Smiths chronology
| Best...I (1992) | ...Best II (1992) | Singles (1995) |

Alternative cover
- US cover of ...Best II

Professional ratings
Review scores
| Source | Rating |
|---|---|
| AllMusic | 2/5 stars |
| The Encyclopedia of Popular Music | 2/5 stars |

...Best II is a compilation album by the Smiths. It was released on November 2, 1992, by the new owner of their back catalogue, WEA (Sire Records in the United States). Its highest British chart position was #29; it did not chart in the U.S.

== Background ==
WEA (now the Warner Music Group) had acquired the entire Smiths back catalogue in early 1992 (sister label Sire Records already had the North American rights). Along with the re-release of the eight original albums (the four studio albums, the Rank live album and the three compilation albums issued while the band were still active), they immediately set to work compiling a 'best of' collection in two volumes. It was the first time a regular best of compilation had ever been made of The Smiths' material and the first volume effortlessly reached the top of the British charts. This, the second volume, fared considerably worse. The British press continued to groan about sell-out and low track selection coherence.

The material is more or less picked and sequenced at random, and consists of both singles and album cuts. As with the first volume, in the UK a spin-off single was released: "There Is a Light That Never Goes Out" (which had originally been earmarked as a single back in 1986 but was ultimately passed over in favour of "Bigmouth Strikes Again"). The single was released ahead of the compilation album and reached No. 25.

=== Cover ===
The UK and European release of the record featured the right half of a 1960s biker couple photograph by Dennis Hopper on its sleeve, with Best...I completing the picture; the U.S. sleeve was designed by singer Morrissey and once again features Richard Davalos, co-star of East of Eden (other shots of Davalos grace the covers of Strangeways, Here We Come and the U.S. edition of Best...I).

== Track listing ==
All tracks written by Morrissey and Johnny Marr (including "Oscillate Wildly").

| No. | Title | Release(s) | Length |
|---|---|---|---|
| 1. | "The Boy with the Thorn in His Side (Album version)" | The Queen Is Dead | 3:16 |
| 2. | "The Headmaster Ritual" | Meat Is Murder | 4:52 |
| 3. | "Heaven Knows I'm Miserable Now" | 1984 single Hatful of Hollow; Louder Than Bombs | 3:34 |
| 4. | "Ask" | 1986 single The World Won't Listen; Louder Than Bombs | 3:15 |
| 5. | "Oscillate Wildly" | Single B-side of "How Soon Is Now?"; The World Won't Listen; Louder Than Bombs | 3:26 |
| 6. | "Nowhere Fast" | Meat is Murder | 2:35 |
| 7. | "Still Ill" | The Smiths | 3:20 |
| 8. | "Bigmouth Strikes Again" | The Queen Is Dead | 3:14 |
| 9. | "That Joke Isn't Funny Anymore" | Meat is Murder | 4:57 |
| 10. | "Shakespeare's Sister" | Single A-side; The World Won't Listen; Louder Than Bombs | 2:08 |
| 11. | "Girl Afraid" | Hatful of Hollow; Louder Than Bombs | 2:46 |
| 12. | "Reel Around the Fountain" | The Smiths | 5:56 |
| 13. | "Last Night I Dreamt That Somebody Loved Me" | Strangeways, Here We Come | 5:02 |
| 14. | "There Is a Light That Never Goes Out" | The Queen Is Dead | 4:02 |

== Personnel ==
- Morrissey – vocals
- Johnny Marr – guitars, keyboard instruments, harmonica, mandolins, synthesized string and flute arrangements
- Andy Rourke – bass guitar, cello on "Oscillate Wildly" and "Shakespeare's Sister"
- Mike Joyce – drums
- Craig Gannon – rhythm guitar on "Ask"

=== Additional musicians ===
- Kirsty MacColl – backing vocals on "Ask"
- Paul Carrack – piano and organ on "Reel Around the Fountain".

=== Production ===
- John Porter – producer (A2, A5-A6, B2-B3)
- The Smiths – producers (A3-A4, A7, B4-B5)
- Morrissey and Marr – producers (A1, B1, B7)
- Johnny Marr, Morrissey and Stephen Street – producers (B6)

== Charts ==
=== Weekly charts ===
Weekly chart performance
| Chart (1992) | Peak position |
|---|---|
| Australian Albums (ARIA) | 190 |
| UK Albums (Official Charts) | 29 |

Weekly chart performance
| Chart (2026) | Peak position |
|---|---|
| Croatian International Albums (HDU) | 6 |
| Greek Albums (IFPI) | 73 |
| Hungarian Physical Albums (MAHASZ) | 5 |

=== Monthly charts ===
Monthly chart performance
| Chart (2026) | Position |
|---|---|
| Croatian International Vinyl Albums (HDU) | 7 |

== Certifications and sales ==
Certifications and sales for ...Best II
| Region | Certification | Certified units/sales |
|---|---|---|
| Brazil (Pro-Música Brasil) | Gold | 100,000^{*} |
| United Kingdom (BPI) | Gold | 100,000^{^} |
| United States | — | 208,357 |
^{*} Sales figures based on certification alone.^{^} Shipments figures based on certification alone.
