= Smithdom =

UK musical group

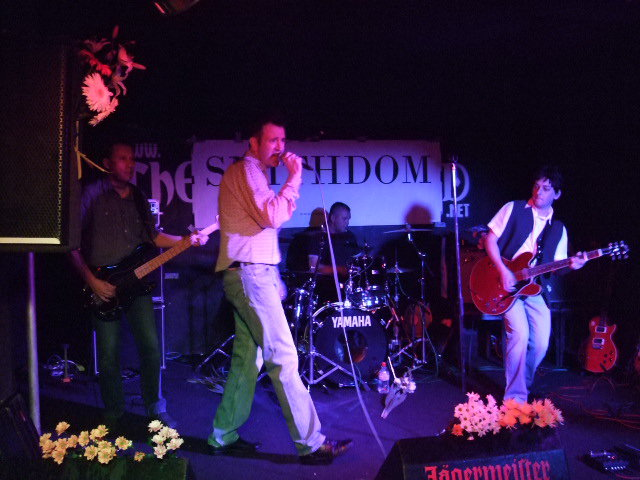
Smithdom, live in 2010

Smithdom is a tribute band who play the music of The Smiths from 1983 to 1987. The band is from Manchester, England.

== Background ==
Smithdom was formed in February 2009, but only found a singer in June of that year after an appeal in the Manchester Evening News and City Life. Their first gig was in October 2009 in Bolton and they were well received. They have attracted a lot of interest since and have been interviewed along with other Smiths tribute bands for the Los Angeles-based Covers magazine. The band took their name from one of the proposed names that Morrissey had suggested before deciding on The Smiths. The musicians have played in bands in the North West of England for several years and have played with and supported Badly Drawn Boy and John Cooper Clarke.

They play the music of The Smiths from 1983 to 1987, and aim to create the live sound of The Smiths final tour in 1986, which can be heard on their posthumous live album Rank. Recently the name of the band was changed to The Smiths Ltd.

== Band members ==
- J. Turner (Morrissey) - Vocals
- A. Gaskell (Johnny Marr) - Guitar
- A. Crook (Andy Rourke) - Bass
- K. Partington (Mike Joyce) - Drums
