= Fanny Fields =

American singer, dancer and comic entertainer

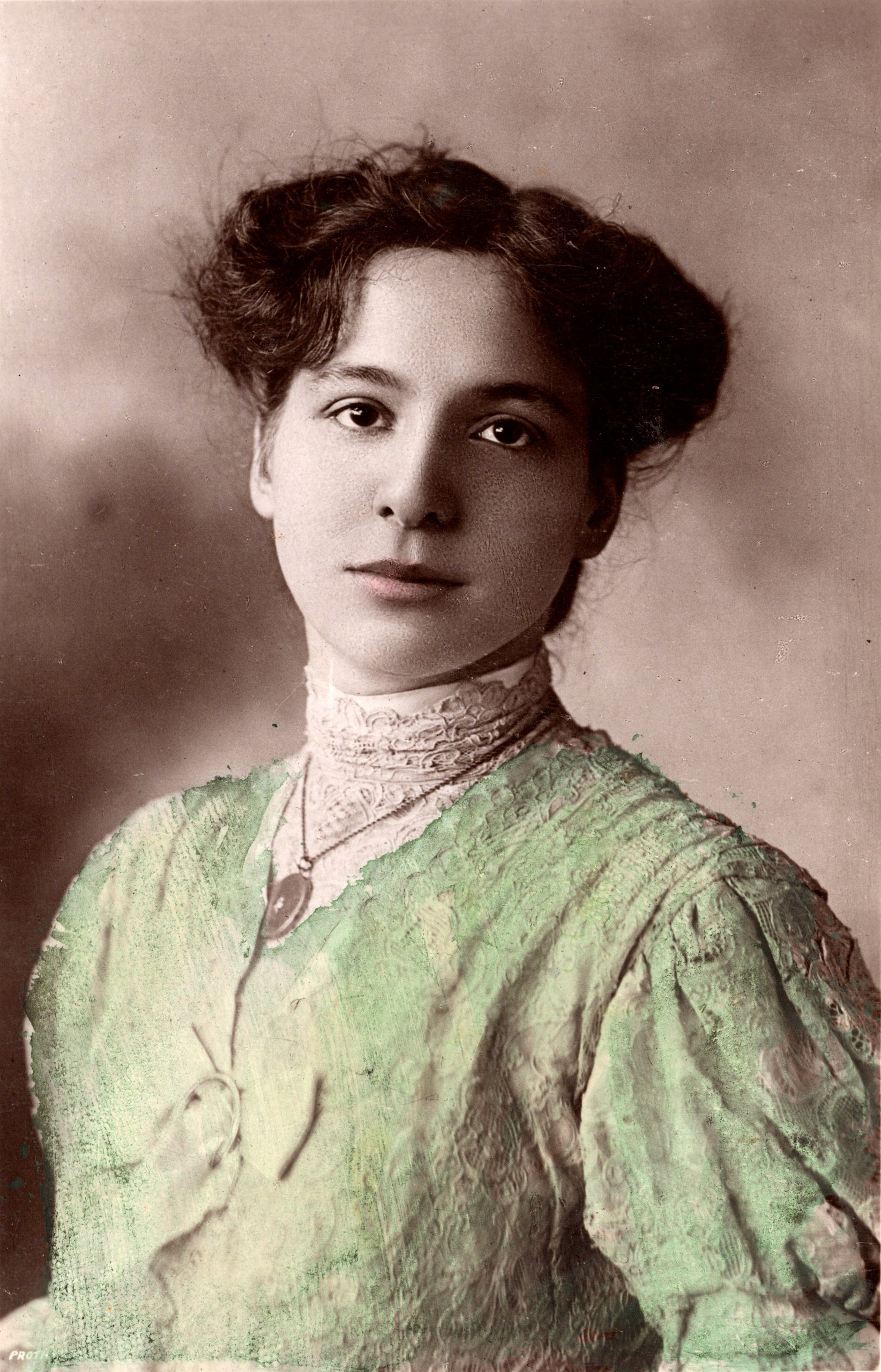
- Fields about 1905
- Born: Fanny Furman; September 15, 1880; New York City, U.S.
- Died: September 12, 1961 (aged 80); New York City, U.S.
- Occupation: Music hall entertainer
- Years active: 1899–1913
- Spouse: Abraham Rongy

Fanny Fields (born Fanny Furman, September 15, 1880 – September 12, 1961), often billed as 'Happy' Fanny Fields, was an American singer, dancer and comic entertainer who found success in British music halls and pantomimes in the early 1900s.

== Biography ==
She was born in New York City, into a Jewish family of Polish and German heritage, and first appeared in variety shows in the city around 1899. She took the stage name Fields from that of her sister's husband, who was one half of a duo, Gallagher and Fields. In her act, she sang and told comic stories as Gretchen, a naïve young German or Dutch woman who "spent much time contemplating the actions of a sweetheart".

In 1902, she travelled to London, where she became a great success in music halls and in pantomimes such as Aladdin. Later that year, a reviewer in The Playgoer described her as "one big bubble of mirth and merriment". She toured in the company of Welsh harpist Nansi Richards, and helped devise tricks for Richards to perform, such as playing with her back turned, or playing two harps simultaneously. In 1906, Fanny Fields had her greatest success with the song "By the Side of the Zuider Zee", written for her by A. J. Mills and Bennett Scott. She also performed "The Suffragette", with a monologue section starting: "The points is, girls, stand up for your rights. If you can't stand up, sit down, but don't let them catch you bending. Why should a woman play second fiddle to a man? Huh!...".

She performed her act before King George V at the first Royal Command Performance, held in 1912. She also starred in a short film, Happy Fanny Fields and the Four Little Dutchmen, made by the Selsior company.

The following year, 1913, she quit her entertainment career. Described as "one of [the] brightest stars" of the music halls, a farewell dinner was arranged by the theatrical profession in her honour at the Savoy Hotel. She returned to the United States and married Dr. Abraham Rongy (né Roginsky, 1878–1949), a gynecologist who set up maternity hospitals and later published Abortion: Legal or Illegal? (1933), one of the first books proposing the legalization of abortion. As Fanny Furman Rongy, she became an active fundraiser for Lebanon Hospital and other Jewish medical organizations.

She died in New York City in 1961, aged 80.

In a 2002 ITV biography, Joan Rivers revealed that Fields was a grandaunt on her mother's side and that "(Fanny) was the star of the family; she came over to the United States and married very, very rich and became very grand. She was the one person Noël Coward wanted to meet when he hit the United States."
