= The Queen Is Dead (song) =

Single by The Smiths

from the album The Queen Is Dead
- B-side: "Oscillate Wildly" "Money Changes Everything" "The Draize Train" "I Keep Mine Hidden"
- Released: 16 June 2017
- Recorded: October–November 1985
- Studio: Jacobs Studios (Farnham)
- Genre: Alternative rock
- Length: 6:05 (single version); 6:24 (album version)
- Label: Rough Trade
- Songwriters: Morrissey; Johnny Marr (Note: The song includes a snippet of "Take Me Back to Dear Old Blighty", which was written by A. J. Mills, Fred Godfrey and Bennett Scott.)
- Producers: Morrissey; Johnny Marr

The Smiths singles chronology
| "Sweet and Tender Hooligan" (1995) | "The Queen Is Dead" (2017) |

"The Queen Is Dead" is a 1986 song by the English alternative rock band the Smiths, appearing on their third studio album of the same name. Written by Morrissey and Johnny Marr, the song features anti-monarchist lyrics that attracted controversy in the UK music press. Musically, the song was a result of experimentation and jamming, with Marr and rhythm section Andy Rourke and Mike Joyce using technology in the studio to enhance their performances.

Though not released as a single until 2017, "The Queen Is Dead" attracted notoriety in its time and made several appearances in the band's live setlist. In the years since its release, it has since seen critical acclaim for Morrissey's savage lyrics and the band's aggressive instrumental performance.

== Background ==
The origins of "The Queen Is Dead" date to a live performance of the band's 1985 song "Barbarism Begins at Home", where Smiths frontman and lyricist Morrissey ad-libbed the lyrics "the queen is dead", a phrase from the novel Last Exit to Brooklyn (1964). Morrissey later decided to revisit the phrase for the lyric of a new song. Inspired by the political tone of the lyric, Smiths guitarist Johnny Marr wrote the music by drawing on MC5 and the Velvet Underground's "I Can't Stand It", a song which had been unreleased by the band until it appeared on an archival compilation in 1985. Much of the song's composition resulted from extensive jamming in the studio. As bassist Andy Rourke recalled:

Sometimes you can go into the studio and you can play for a whole day and nothing will happen. That day magic happened and we came up with this amazing song that became the theme of the whole album.

Rourke composed the song's bassline in the studio, a performance Marr described as an accomplishment "that [other] bass players still haven't matched". Upon Rourke's death in 2023, Marr added: "Watching him play bass on the song 'The Queen Is Dead' was so impressive that I said to myself 'I'll never forget this moment.'"

Marr also developed his guitar line in the studio, manipulating the note of a harmonic with the angle of his wah-wah pedal. Mike Joyce's layered drum intro was the result of a looped sample that Joyce recorded. According the band's engineer Stephen Street, "We had this very antiquated sampler ... you could only record for so long but you could loop it. We got Mike to play this rumbling rhythm and then sampled a small section of it."

Lyrically, the song explores Morrissey's antipathy for the monarchy, an institution he has since described as an "unequal and inequitable social system". (Note: On the song specifically, Morrissey commented, "I didn't want to attack the monarchy in a sort of beer monster way. But I found, as time goes by, this happiness we had slowly slips away and is replaced by something that is wholly grey and wholly saddening. The very idea of the monarchy and the Queen of England is being reinforced and made to seem more useful than it really is".) Morrissey additionally makes camp references to the double meaning of queen: as he noted in the press, "There's a safety net in the song that the 'old queen' is me". The song also draws for lyrical inspiration upon the incident when Michael Fagan trespassed in Buckingham Palace and encountered Queen Elizabeth II. According to author Tony Fletcher, the lyric "When you're tied to your mother's apron, no one talks about castration" was a reference to Morrissey's close relationship with his mother when growing up.

Per Morrissey's request, the song begins with a snippet of "Take Me Back to Dear Old Blighty", sung by actress Cicely Courtneidge in the 1962 film The L-Shaped Room. At the suggestion of Street, about a minute of the song's jam was cut from the final recording. Originally, the band had planned for the song to fade out.

== Release ==
"The Queen Is Dead" was first released as the opening track on the band's 1986 studio album of the same name. It was not released as a single at the time, though a video was produced. The song's lyrics attracted controversy in the music press—Morrissey recalled an incident where a magazine, much to his dismay, falsely reported that he apologized to the Queen.

"The Queen Is Dead" was accompanied by a music video directed by Derek Jarman, which starts with a sampled excerpt from Bryan Forbes' 1962 British film The L-Shaped Room. Mayo Thompson of the Red Krayola was an associate producer for the film and through working for Rough Trade persuaded Jarman to direct a promotional video for the Smiths.

"The Queen Is Dead" appeared in the band's live setlists during this period, with Joyce reproducing the song's artificial drum intro live without tapes. A live version of the song appears on the band's 1988 live album Rank. Billboard described this version of the song as "snarling".

To promote the 2017 collector's edition rerelease of The Queen Is Dead, the title track was released exclusively as a limited-edition vinyl single in seven and twelve-inch forms. Morrissey criticized record retailer HMV for placing stickers on the singles limiting them to one per customer, imploring fans to don "seven variable wigs" and other disguises in order to "buy as many copies of 'The Queen Is Dead' at HMV as you desire". This 2017 single reached number 85 on the UK charts. After the death of Queen Elizabeth II on 8 September 2022, "The Queen Is Dead" saw a 1,687% uptick in streaming numbers.

== Critical reception ==
"The Queen Is Dead" has seen critical acclaim since its release. Spin called the track "exciting" and acknowledged, "You gotta admire a guy who can rhyme 'rusty spanner' with 'play pianner'." Mark Coleman of Rolling Stone praised the song for "parod[ying] media fascination with the royal family over bombastic guitar bursts and an aggressive bass line". Stephen Thomas Erlewine of AllMusic described the song as "storming", while the same site's Stewart Mason lauded Morrissey's lyrics as "both savage and hilarious" and named the song "one of the band's masterpieces".

Blender noted the song as a key track to download from the album. Rolling Stone ranked the song as the seventh-best Smiths song, writing, "By the time the Smiths are finished beating up on 'The Queen Is Dead', England is theirs". NME named it the band's ninth-best, while Consequence of Sound ranked the song as the band's tenth-best, calling it the "best start of any Smiths record". Billboard also ranked it as the tenth-best Smiths song, concluding, "Yes, the Smiths can kick ass".

== Personnel ==
Personnel taken from The Queen Is Dead liner notes, except where noted.

The Smiths

- Morrissey – vocals
- Johnny Marr – guitars
- Andy Rourke – bass guitar
- Mike Joyce – drums

Additional personnel

- Stephen Street – engineering, drum sampling

== Charts ==
| Chart (2017) | Peak position |
|---|---|
| UK Singles (Official Charts) | 85 |
