= Aya (band) =

Slovak rock band

AYA
- Origin: Žilina, Slovakia
- Genres: Rock
- Years active: 1992–present
- Labels: Jumbo Records; Polygram; Slovakia Records; Sony BMG
- Members: Mário Tománek; Boris Lettrich; Vlado Kubala; Rado Pažej; Stano Vandlík
- Past members: Tibor Nekoranec, Vlado Pavlo
- Website: aya-music.sk

Aya is a Slovak rock band formed in autumn 1992 in Žilina, Slovakia. Among their best-known hits are the songs "Malý princ" and "Baby kakavové". In 1998 the band started performing annual Christmas concerts, holding the 17th such event in 2014. The group toured Slovakia in 2012 celebrating their 20th anniversary.

== Members ==
- Mário Tománek – guitars
- Boris Lettrich – lead vocals
- Vlado Kubala – bass guitar
- Rado Pažej – drums
- Stano Vandlík – keyboards

== Discography ==
- Aj ty, Aya?! – 1994
- Jé, jé, jé... – 1997
- Try – 2000
- 04-10 – 2003
- Ale ye nám dobre – 2007
