= Selsior =

Selsior was a British silent film production company, which from 1913 to 1917 made films of dance performances for synchronisation with a live orchestra.

The technique was developed by Oszkár Rausch (b. 1884 in Budapest), an émigré who arrived in London in 1910. It involved filming a dance performance, with an orchestral conductor in shot in the corner of frame, so that the live orchestra at the screening before an audience would then see and follow the conductor's timing. The company made at least twelve films using this system, and they became very popular with audiences. The films covered dances such as the tango, foxtrot, quickstep and ragtime, involving amateur ballroom dance champions, as well as footage of American-born music hall performer Fanny Fields.

However, the company was not financially successful, and Rausch was declared bankrupt. He was then interned as an enemy alien at Knockaloe Internment Camp on the Isle of Man. None of the Selsior films have survived.
