= Take Me Back to Dear Old Blighty =

Song by Florrie Forde
- Published: 1916
- Songwriters: Arthur J. Mills; Fred Godfrey; Bennett Scott

Official audio
- "Take Me Back to Dear Old Blighty" on YouTube

"Take Me Back to Dear Old Blighty" is a music hall song written by Arthur J. Mills, Fred Godfrey and Bennett Scott in 1916. It was popular during the First World War, and tells a story of three fictional soldiers on the Western Front suffering from homesickness and their longing to return to "Blighty" — a slang term for Britain.

== Composition ==
Fred Godfrey wrote the song with Bennett Scott and A.J. Mills after passing a music hall in Oxford where a show called Blighty was showing. He recounts: "One of us suddenly said “What an idea for a song!” Four hours later it was all finished, and the whole country was singing it soon afterwards. I got — not very much."

The chorus lyric "Take me back to dear old Blighty/Put me on the train for London town" was included in The Oxford Dictionary of Quotations.

== Recordings ==
Recordings by Florrie Forde and Ella Retford are the most commonly heard versions, though Dorothy Ward recorded it first in 1916.

British singer Kevin Coyne recorded the song on his 1978 album Dynamite Daze, with piano accompaniment by Tim Rice.

== Use in other media ==
A recording of the song by Cicely Courtneidge from the 1962 film The L-Shaped Room was sampled at the beginning of the title track of the album The Queen Is Dead by the Smiths.

A version called "Bring it Back to Blighty", with different lyrics, was recorded as the England song for the 2010 FIFA World Cup.
