= Drumcliff =

Village in County Sligo, Ireland

Drumcliff Droim Chliabh
- Village
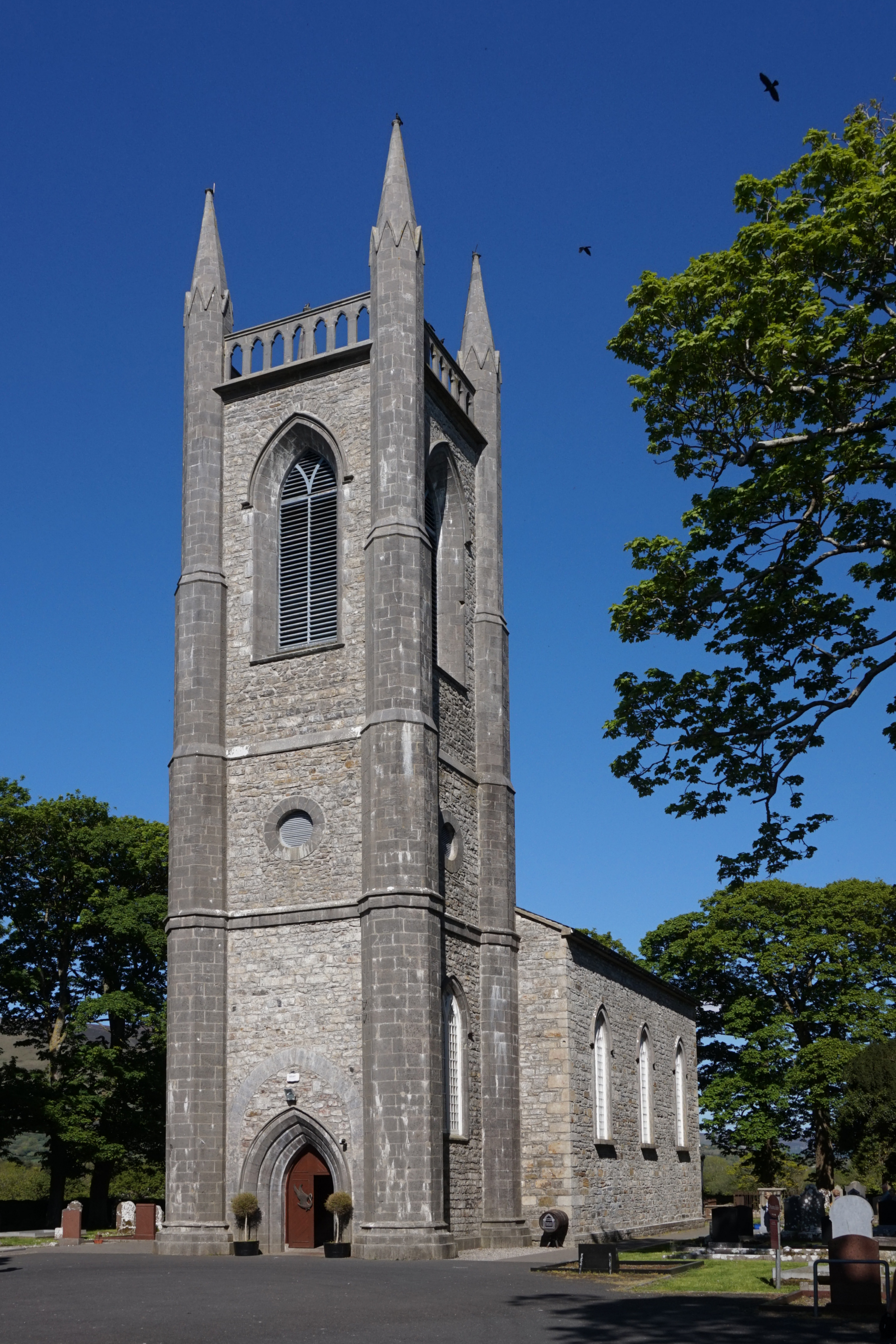
- St Columba's Church of Ireland in Drumcliff

- Location in Ireland
- Coordinates: 54°20′00″N 8°30′00″W
- Country: Ireland
- Province: Connacht
- County: County Sligo
- Elevation: 8 m (26 ft)
- Irish Grid Reference: G675428

Drumcliff or Drumcliffe (Irish: Droim Chliabh, meaning 'ridge of the baskets') is a village in County Sligo, Ireland. It is 8 km (5 mi) north of Sligo town on the N15 road on a low gravel ridge between the mountain of Ben Bulben and Drumcliff Bay. It is on the Drumcliff River, originally called the "Codnach", which drains Glencar Lake. Drumcliff is the resting place of the Irish poet W. B. Yeats. Drumcliff is in a civil parish of the same name.

== History ==
The old name of Drumcliff was Cnoc na Teagh (trans. Hill of the House). The village is one of several possible locations in County Sligo for the settlement of Nagnata as marked on Claudius Ptolemy's early map of Ireland. The name Codnach means placid or even tempered river. A battle was fought on this river in A.M. 3656 (1538 BC) by the legendary Milesian monarch Tigearnmas.

An ancient topographical poem in the Dinnsenchus (Lore of Places) tells how the baskets in the name refer to the wicker frames of a fleet of boats that was once made here. The poem is part of a lost epic story involving the Fomorians in a raid on an island in the western ocean.

Drumcliff formed the western extremity of the kingdom of Bréifne (the eastern end was Kells), and the northern extremity of Tir Fhiacrach Múaidhe (Tireragh).

The Battle of the Book took place near Drumcliff between 555 AD and 561 AD.

The historian Mac Firbisigh mention a "Fort of Codhnach", known to be a fort near Drumcliff, although its location now is unknown.

=== The Monastery ===
St. Colmcille founded a monastery in Drumcliff in about 575. The monastery was of such importance that it gave its name to the territory of Cairbre Drom Cliabh in which it resides. The first abbot was St. Mothorian.

Lord of Cairbre, Dunadhach, a noble protection, a famous man by whom hostages were held, A pious soldier of the race of Conn (lies interred) under hazel crosses at Drumcliff

The annals mention that in 1225, Amlaib Ó Beólláin, erenach of Drumcliff, a man eminent for generosity and for his guest-house, died this year. The Ó Beólláin family were hereditary keepers of Drumcliff monastery.

1187 - Drumcliff was plundered by the son of Mael Seachlainn Ó Ruairc, King of Uí Briúin Bréifne and Conmaicne Maigh Rein and by the son of Cathal Ó Ruairc, accompanied by the English of Meath. But God and St. Columbkille wrought a remarkable miracle in this instance; for the son of Melaghlin O'Rourke was killed in Conmaicne a fortnight afterwards, and the eyes of the son of Cathal O'Rourke were put out by O'Muldory (Flaherty) in revenge of Columbkille. One hundred and twenty of the son of Melaghlin's retainers were also killed throughout Conmaicne and Carbury of Drumcliff, through the miracles of God and St. Columbkille.

1355.1 - Conor Mac Consnava, Bishop of Bréifne Kilmore, from Drumcliff to Kells, died.

All that remains of the monastery now is an Irish High Cross dating to c. 1100, and a ruined 10th or 11th century round tower, the only one known in County Sligo, The round tower was struck by lightning in 1396. Further decorated cross slabs are built into the walls of the current church.

== William Butler Yeats ==
Drumcliff is the final resting place of the poet W. B. Yeats (1865–1939), who is buried in the graveyard of St. Columba's Church of Ireland. Although Yeats died in Roquebrune-Cap-Martin, France in January 1939, his remains were brought home to Ireland by the Irish Naval Service and re-interred at Drumcliff in 1948 in the presence of a large number of local people and dignitaries which included the Minister for External Affairs, Éamon de Valera and Seán MacBride, who represented the Government. His famous epitaph, written in the poem "Under Ben Bulben", reads:

Cast a cold Eye

On Life, on Death.

Horseman, pass by.

Yeats paternal great-grandfather was rector in Drumcliff, as John Butler Yeats remarked in a letter to his son William in 1913:

My father, tho' a low Churchman, hated Presbyterianism and Presbyterians. Why? Because he knew like members of his own family the Catholic peasants of Drumcliff. In his time there were forty houses between the rectory gate and the round tower, now there is only one. In my grandfather's time he & the parish priest were friends. Maynooth did not exist, and the priest was educated in the liberal atmosphere of a French College, and possibly both of them read Voltaire and Gibbon. One of the peasants told me he remembered the priest getting up a bonfire to celebrate my grandfather's return to the parish from a protracted sojourn in Dublin.

== Gallery ==
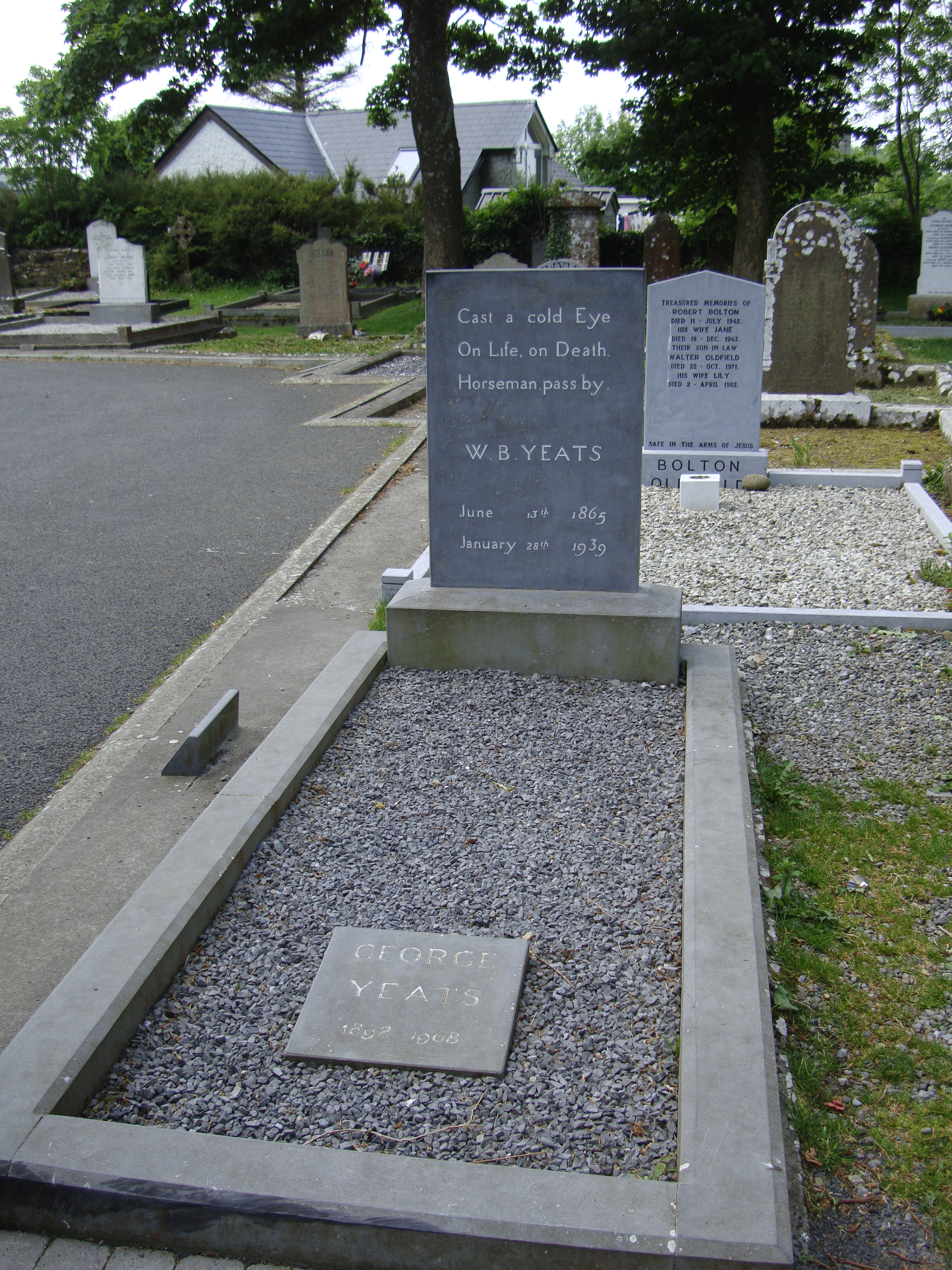
The grave of W. B. Yeats in Drumcliff Cemetery

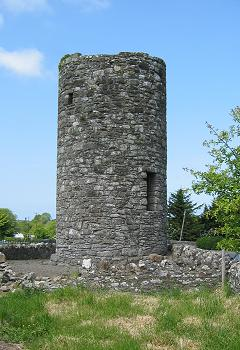
The round tower in Drumcliff

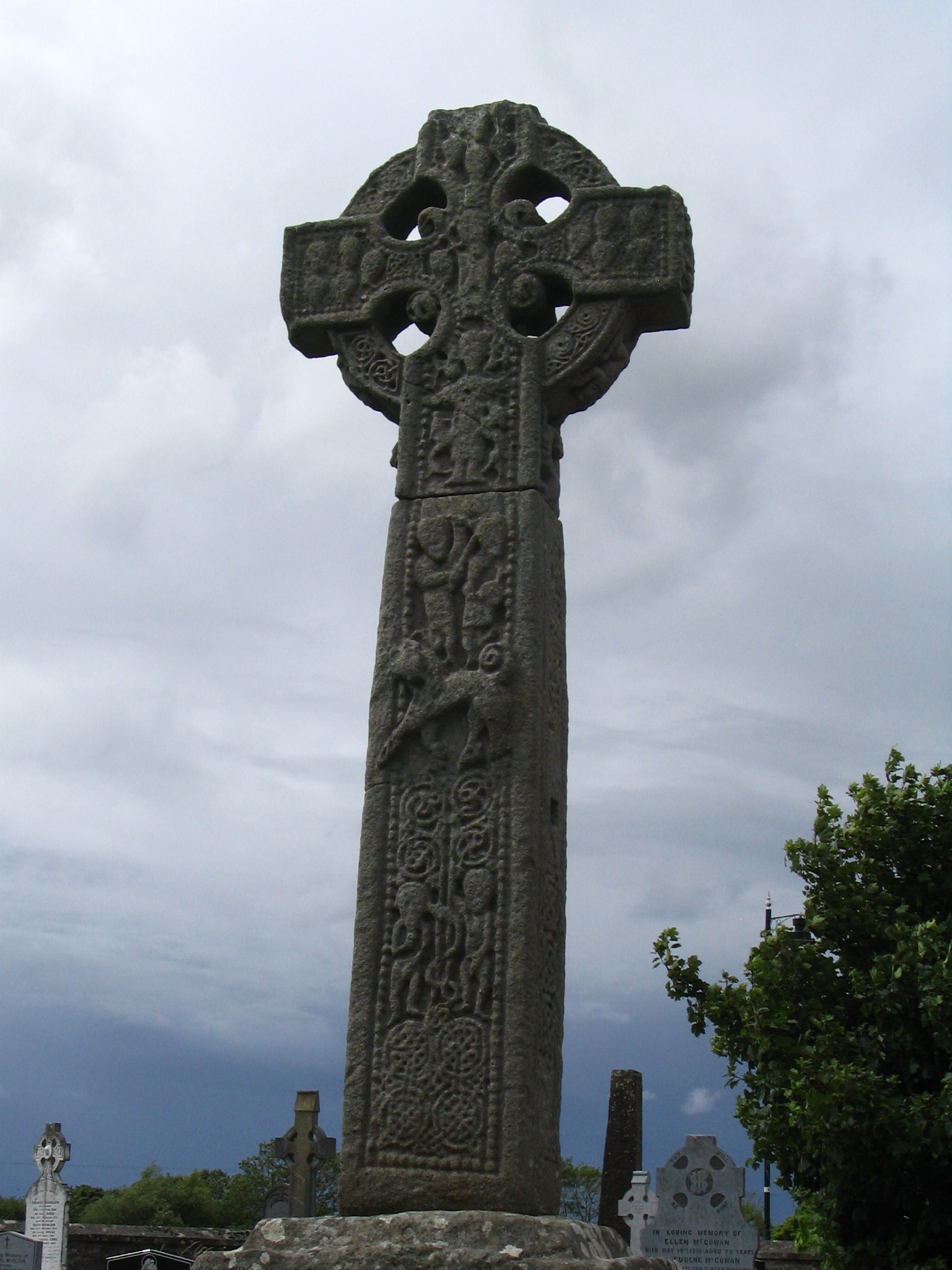
Celtic High cross in Drumcliff Cemetery

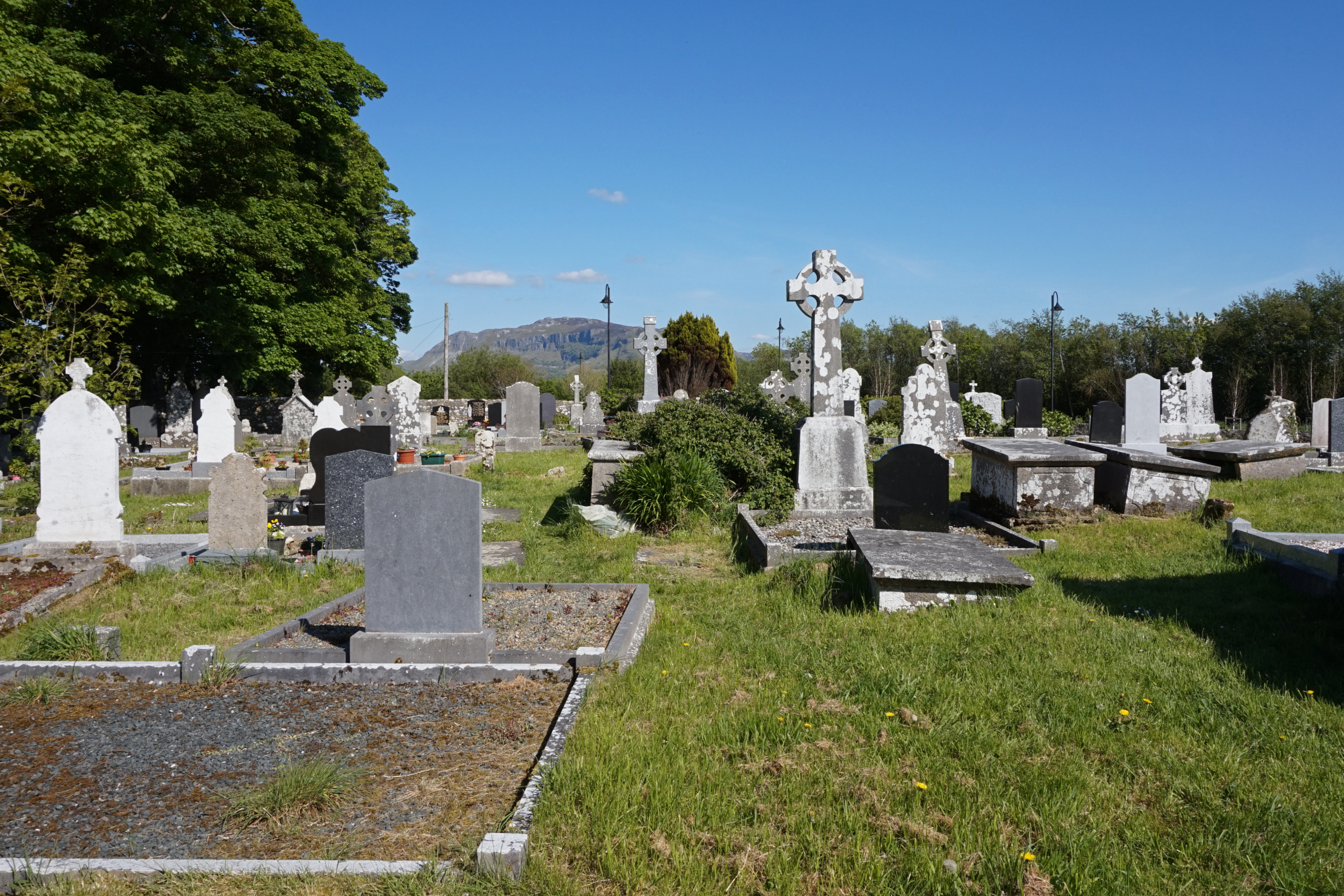
Drumcliff cemetery

== See also ==
- List of towns and villages in Ireland
