= Les Inrockuptibles =

French cultural magazine

- Frequency: Weekly
- First issue: 1986
- Company: Les Nouvelles Editions Indépendantes
- Country: France
- Based in: Paris
- Language: French
- Website: lesinrocks.com
- ISSN: 0298-3788 (print); 2491-4002 (web)

Les Inrockuptibles (French pronunciation: [lez‿ɛ̃ʁɔkyptibl]), abbreviated as Les Inrocks (pronounced [lez‿ɛ̃ʁɔk]), is a French cultural magazine. Started as a monthly in 1986, it became weekly in 1995. As of 2021, it returned to a monthly format. In the beginning, rock music was the magazine's primary focus, though every issue included articles on other topics, generally with a left-wing perspective. Its name is a blend of the words "rock" and "incorruptibles" and a spoonerism of the latter.

The magazine has produced several tribute records, including I'm Your Fan to Leonard Cohen in 1991, The Smiths Is Dead in 1996, and Monsieur Gainsbourg Revisited in 2006. Since 1988, it has included CD compilations as part of individual issues.

Guillaume B. Decherf, a music critic and journalist for the magazine, was killed during the November 2015 Paris attacks at an Eagles of Death Metal concert at the Bataclan. In 2017, the magazine drew controversy for featuring the singer Bertrand Cantat, who murdered French actress Marie Trintignant, on its front cover. After public outrage and a critical editorial published by Elle France, the magazine issued an apology.

A Spanish-language edition of the magazine, named Los Inrockuptibles, was published in Argentina between 1996 and 2018.
