= Ship Ahoy! (All the Nice Girls Love a Sailor) =

Song by Hetty King
- Published: 1908
- Songwriter(s): Bennett Scott, Arthur J. Mills (and possibly Fred Godfrey)

"Ship Ahoy! (All the Nice Girls Love a Sailor)" is an English music hall song from 1908, written by Bennett Scott and A. J. Mills of the Star music publishing company in London. Some sources credit Scott alone; others additionally credit their colleague Fred Godfrey.

The song was first performed by male impersonator Hetty King. She later said that she first sang it at the Liverpool Empire in 1908, but it did not become successful until 1909, when it became popular and, towards the end of the year, was described as the greatest pantomime hit for four years. The song stayed in King's repertoire for the rest of her life, and has remained popular. It was first recorded in 1910, by Ella Retford.

The words of the chorus are:

All the nice girls love a sailor
All the nice girls love a tar
For there's something about a sailor
Well, you know what sailors are
Bright and breezy, free and easy
He's the ladies' pride and joy
Falls in love with Kate and Jane
Then he's off to sea again
Ship ahoy! Ship ahoy!
