= I Know It's Over =

Song by the Smiths

from the album The Queen Is Dead
- Released: June 1986
- Recorded: 1985
- Studio: Jacobs, Farnham, UK
- Length: 5:48
- Label: Rough Trade
- Composer: Johnny Marr
- Lyricist: Morrissey
- Producers: Morrissey & Marr, Stephen Street (engineer)

"I Know It's Over" is a song by the English rock band the Smiths. Recorded in 1985, it is the third track on their third studio album The Queen Is Dead.

== Background ==
The instrumentation was written by Johnny Marr in summer 1985. Morrissey's vocal performance on this track is considered by many to be one of the finest of his career. The song was originally meant to have trumpet on it during the refrain at the end, but it was scrapped. In the book Songs That Saved Your Life, Simon Goddard explains that Morrissey did not show his bandmates the lyric until the instrumental track was entirely finished. Marr once described witnessing Morrissey's vocal performance as "one of the highlights of my life".

== Reception ==
Simon Reynolds of Pitchfork wrote: "The writing in 'I Know It's Over' is a tour de force, from the opening image of the empty—sexless, loveless—bed as a grave, through the suicidal inversions of 'The sea wants to take me/The knife wants to slit me,' onto the self-lacerations of 'If you're so funny, then why are you on your own tonight?' and finally the unexpected and amazing grace of 'It's so easy to hate/It takes strength to be gentle and kind.'" In 2017, Rob Sheffield of Rolling Stone placed the song number three in his ranking of 73 songs by the Smiths.

== Live performances ==
The song was performed 29 times by the Smiths, being played on every show on the UK leg of the Queen Is Dead tour besides the final one-off show. The song is featured on the 1988 live album Rank.

== Cover versions ==
The song was covered frequently in live shows by late American musician Jeff Buckley, and a 1993 recording of the song features on his 2016 posthumously-released compilation album You and I.

== Personnel ==
- Morrissey – vocals
- Johnny Marr – guitars
- Andy Rourke – bass guitar
- Mike Joyce – drums
