= Cemetry Gates =

Single by The Smiths

from the album The Queen Is Dead
- A-side: "Ask"
- Released: 20 October 1986
- Recorded: October–November 1985
- Studio: Jacobs Studios, Farnham
- Genre: Alternative rock
- Label: Rough Trade
- Composer: Johnny Marr
- Lyricist: Morrissey
- Producers: Morrissey, Johnny Marr, Stephen Street (engineer)

"Cemetry Gates" is a 1986 song by English alternative rock band the Smiths from The Queen Is Dead, their third album. Written by Morrissey and Johnny Marr, the song centres around a guitar riff that Marr initially thought was too uninteresting to base a song around. However, Morrissey liked it and convinced Marr that they could complete the song.

Morrissey's lyrics on the song reflect his memories of walking in graveyards in Manchester and jokingly comment on plagiarism in his song lyrics. "Cemetry Gates" was released as a B-side to the band's 1986 single "Ask". It has seen critical acclaim for Morrissey's humorous lyrics and Marr's gentle guitar line.

== Background ==
"Cemetry Gates" originated when Smiths guitarist Johnny Marr was on a train; he recalled, "I was ... thinking, 'If you're so great, first thing in the morning sit down and write a great song.' I started with 'Cemetry Gates'; B minor to G change in open G."

Marr was initially sceptical of using the song, believing that the guitar part was not interesting enough to be developed into a song. However, Smiths singer Morrissey liked Marr's performance of the song's music and convinced him it was worthy of release. Marr recalled "I did this in my kitchen with Morrissey. When I played it I wasn't sure about it – but that’s one example of how a partnership works. Because Morrissey loved it, and it came so effortlessly and easy. I was just about to bin it."

Engineer Stephen Street stated that "the vibe was just wonderful" while recording the song. Street later said of the song: "It's all the best elements of The Smiths. And what a wonderful vocal and lyric. It's a nice bit of blessed relief. It's delicate, but it's still got power".

== Lyrics ==
Morrissey's lyrics were inspired by his walks with his friend, Linder Sterling, to the Southern Cemetery in Chorlton. The song's lyrics describe two friends spending a day at the graveyard, where one friend lectures the other on plagiarism while ironically taking lines from Richard III and The Man Who Came to Dinner ("all those people, all those lives, where are they now?"). The song features Morrissey commenting on critics who demeaned his quotation of other writers, notably Oscar Wilde. Author Simon Goddard stated of this:

It was extremely ironic, if not deliberately self-parodic, of Morrissey to address the issue of plagiarism in a song which itself brazenly incorporated words which weren't his own.

The song's title was misspelt, though it is unclear whether this was intentional or not.

Although "Cemetry Gates" was inspired by Southern Cemetery in Manchester, the song's central lyric, "Keats and Yeats are on your side/While Wilde is on mine", makes reference to the graves of three noted literary figures who are buried elsewhere; John Keats lies buried at the Protestant Cemetery, Rome, W. B. Yeats' remains are in the churchyard of St Columba's Church, Drumcliff in Ireland, and Oscar Wilde's tomb is in Père Lachaise Cemetery in Paris. In 2006, Morrissey posed for a photo shoot with Mojo Magazine leaning on Keats' gravestone.

References in "Cemetry Gates" lyrics

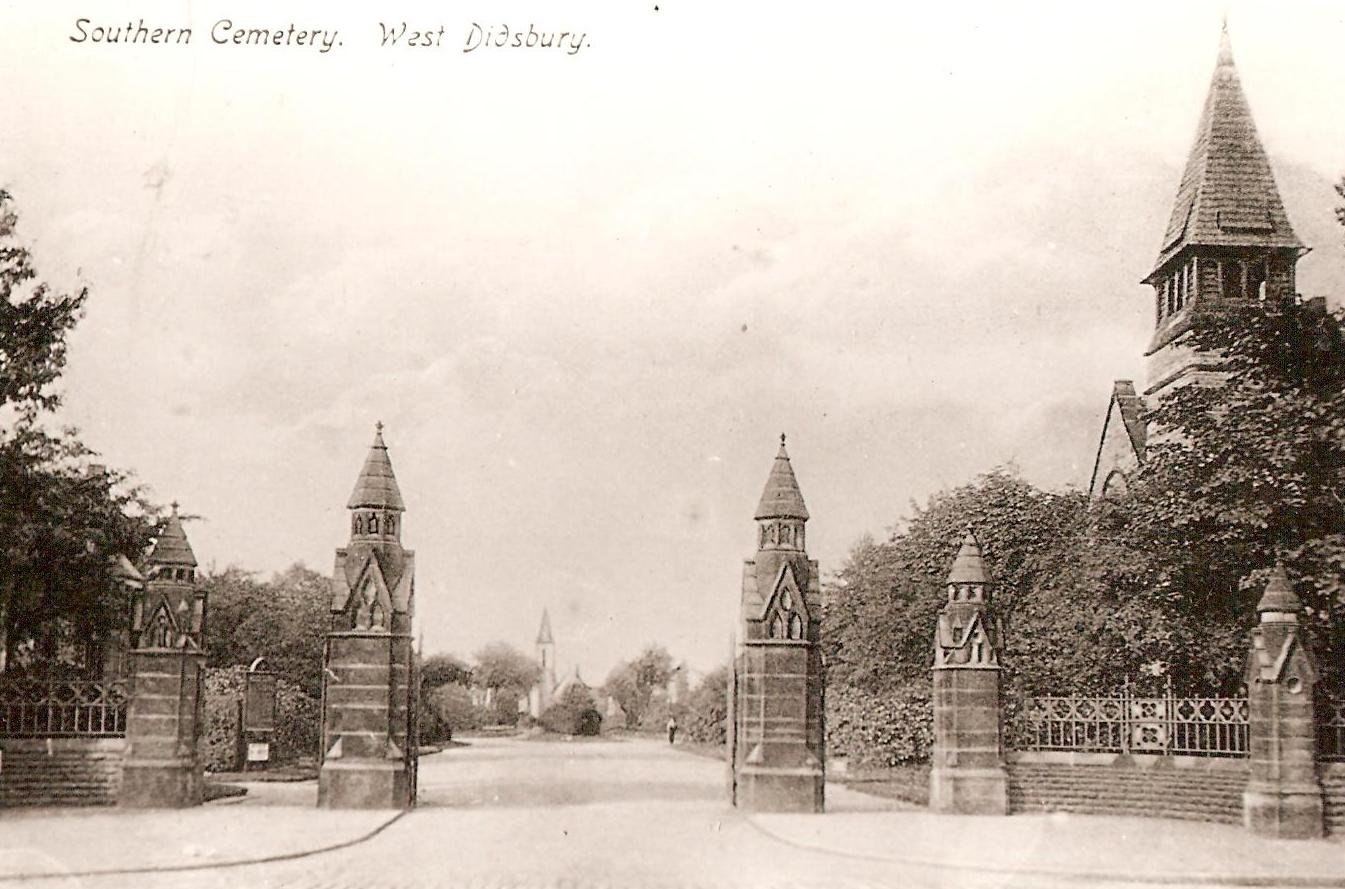
The gates of Southern Cemetery, Manchester, which inspired the song

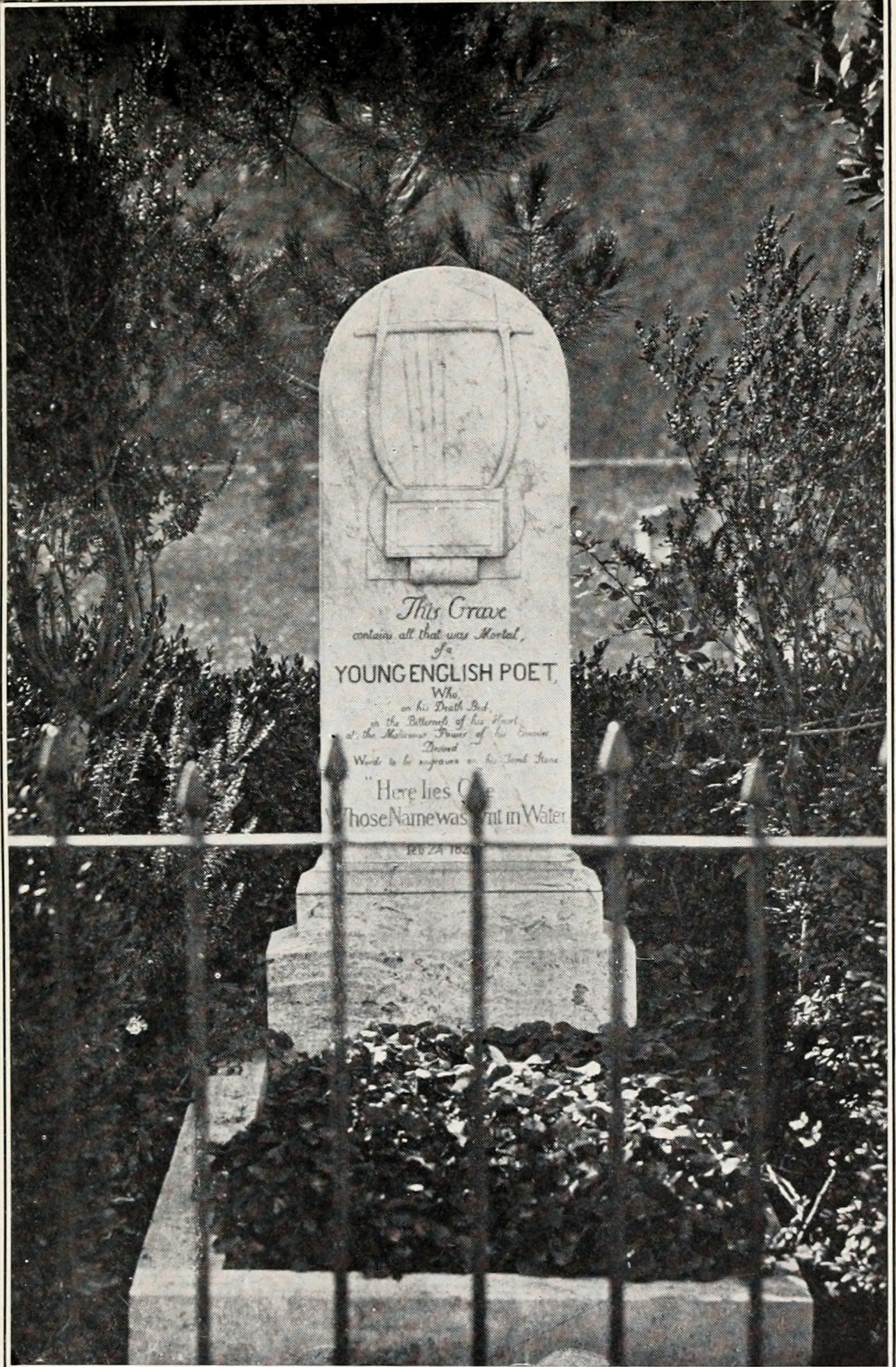
John Keats' grave at the Protestant Cemetery, Rome

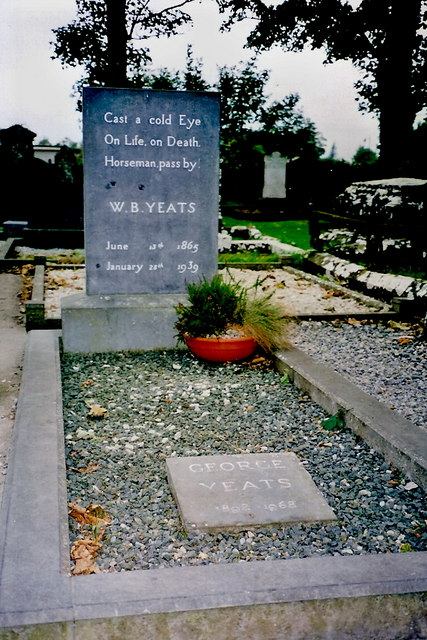
W. B. Yeats' grave at St Columba's Church, Drumcliff

== Release ==
"Cemetry Gates" was first released on the band's 1986 third album The Queen Is Dead. It had been a last-minute addition to the album. The song was included on the B-side to the band's "Ask" single in October 1986. A live version of the song also appeared on the band's 1988 live album, Rank.

Johnny Marr performed the guitar line of the song on an Instagram "Ask Me Anything" session in April 2020.

== Reception ==
"Cemetry Gates" has seen critical acclaim since its release. Mark Coleman of Rolling Stone spoke glowingly of Morrissey's vocal performance on "Cemetry Gates", concluding "When he's at his most pretentious, pitting Wilde against Keats and Yeats in a battle of the bards on 'Cemetry Gates,' Morrissey sounds clearer and more melodic than ever before, wafting unlikely lines to high heaven. Like it or not, this guy's going to be around for a while." Stephen Thomas Erlewine of AllMusic praised the song's "bouncy acoustic pop," while the same site's Stewart Mason noted the song's lyrical matter as "a particularly interesting topic, and one obviously close to the singer's heart."

Blender noted the song as a key track off of the album to download. Billboard named the song as the seventh best Smiths song, praising Marr's "uplifting" guitar line, while Louder included the song in their unranked top ten Smiths songs, calling the track "beautifully written." Rolling Stone ranked the song as the 11th best Smiths song, while NME named it the band's 15th best. Consequence of Sound ranked the song as the band's 29th best, calling it "a rare chance to see Moz comfortable in his own skin."

== Certifications ==
Certifications for "Cemetry Gates"
Region	Certification	Certified units/sales
United Kingdom (BPI) Sales since 2006	Silver	200,000^{‡}
^{‡} Sales+streaming figures based on certification alone.
