= Some Girls Are Bigger Than Others =

- Cover used for the German single, It is similar to that of "Ask" with a different tint.

Single by the Smiths

from the album The Queen Is Dead
- B-side: "The Draize Train" "Frankly, Mr. Shankly"
- Released: October 1986
- Recorded: October–November 1985
- Studio: Jacobs (Farnham, Surrey)
- Genre: Alternative rock, jangle pop
- Length: 3:14 (album version); 3:01 (single version); 3:57 (alternate mix)
- Label: Zensor/Teldec
- Composer: Johnny Marr
- Lyricist: Morrissey
- Producers: Morrissey & Marr

The Smiths singles chronology
"Ask" (1986)	"Some Girls Are Bigger Than Others" (1986)	"Shoplifters of the World Unite" (1987)

"Some Girls Are Bigger Than Others" is a song by the English rock band the Smiths. Recorded in autumn 1985, it was first released on their third studio album The Queen Is Dead in June 1986. It was also released as a single in Germany.

== Background ==
As with every original recording by the Smiths, the music of "Some Girls Are Bigger Than Others" was composed by Johnny Marr and the lyrics were written by Morrissey. The recording was given a distinctive intro by engineer Stephen Street, who increased the reverb on the drums, faded the track in then out again, and took the reverb back off when reintroducing the song: "A bit like opening a door, closing it, then opening it again and walking in". The lyric paraphrases Hank Locklin's 1949 country hit "Send Me the Pillow You Dream On". The phrase "the Dole Age" refers to Unemployment Benefit, nicknamed the "dole"; in the year of the song's release, 1986, 3 million people in the United Kingdom were unemployed.

== Retrospective critique ==
In the British music magazine NME, Adrian Thrills wrote, "As an album with humour never far from its surface, it is fitting that The Queen Is Dead should conclude with the clipped, undulating frivolity of 'Some Girls Are Bigger Than Others', a hypnotic musical travelogue that verges on the transcendental [...] Again, the Morrissey muse and Marr's musical setting collide marvellously, the track illuminated by some lovely slide guitar from the latter. It would have made another classic Smiths single".

Andy Strickland in Record Mirror said, "Morrissey and Marr still can't quite get it together all the time, 'Never Had No One Ever' and 'Some Girls Are Bigger Than Others' bearing all the hallmarks of the familiar Smiths filler, where music and words hardly embrace," while Nick Kent wrote, "'Vicar in a Tutu' and 'Some Girls Are Bigger Than Others', sensibly restrained arrangement-wise, may well be lesser songs but, constructed within their rightful limitations, sound absolutely stunning".

In Simon Goddard's book of track-by-track explications Songs That Saved Your Life, Johnny Marr describes the song as "a beautiful piece of music", while the author writes, "Possessing one of his most alluring guitar melodies [...] if Marr's tune was heaven-sent, then it seemed very nearly blasphemous of Morrissey to christen it 'Some Girls Are Bigger Than Others' and bestow it with its notoriously frivolous lyric".

== Live version ==
"Some Girls Are Bigger Than Others" was performed live only once: at the final concert by the Smiths, at Brixton Academy, London, on 12 December 1986. The performance (which was the third song in the setlist), which included a verse ("On the shop floor, there's a calendar, as obvious as snow, as if we didn't know") not used in the studio version, was recorded and later featured as a B-side on the 12" and cassette edition of the "I Started Something I Couldn't Finish" single in November 1987.

The song remained unperformed by either artist until Morrissey’s 2009 "Tour of Refusal".

He revived the track for 42 shows between April 7 and July 22.

While Morrissey has not played it since, Marr included the song on his setlists nine times between 2021 and 2023.

== Single release ==
In Germany, "Some Girls Are Bigger Than Others" was released as a single in slightly edited form, on 7" and 12" vinyl, with artwork modified from the cover used for "Ask".

=== Sleeve image ===
The single cover depicts actress Yootha Joyce in a still from the 1965 film Catch Us If You Can. The same photograph had been used on the 1986 single "Ask".

=== Etchings on vinyl ===
7" single: "Rock and Rolling to the Top"/"A 'PRECISE DIAMOND' CUT" (Zensor – 6.14656 AC)

12" maxi-single: "---NOH GIRL LIKE JAGUAR ROSE---"/"BUSY TRAIN TO THE LOKOMOTION" (Zensor – 6.20628 AE)

== Track listings ==
7" single
No.	Title	Length
1.	"Some Girls Are Bigger Than Others"	3:01
2.	"The Draize Train"	5:06

12" maxi-single
No.	Title	Length
1.	"Some Girls Are Bigger Than Others"	3:01
2.	"Frankly, Mr Shankly"	2:17
3.	"The Draize Train"	5:06

== In popular culture ==
- 1995: Martin Newell covered the song on The Off White Album, produced by Louis Philippe.
- 1996: Supergrass covered the song on the tribute album The Smiths Is Dead.
- 1997: Slovak musician Karol Mikloš recorded the composition as "Some Boys Are Bigger Than Others" for his debut set The Same Mist Here.
- 2005: The song title was used for a musical based around the music of Morrissey & Marr.
- 2007: German band Brockdorff Klang Labor covered the song for their debut album Mädchenmusik.
- 2009: Irish musician Janie Price of Copenhagen, Denmark, covered the song as the band Bird for her first album Girl And A Cello; in the lyrics of her version, she substitutes the word "girls" for "boys" and the word "mothers" for "fathers".
- 2024: The song's title was used as the headline for an essay in The Lamp magazine about the fat positivity movement.
