= Under the Anheuser Bush =

Song performed by Billy Murray

"Under the Anheuser Bush" is a beer garden song commissioned by the Anheuser-Busch brewing company in 1903. With music by Harry Von Tilzer and words by Andrew B. Sterling, the title contains a pun on the surnames of the company's founders ("Busch" is the German word for "Bush").

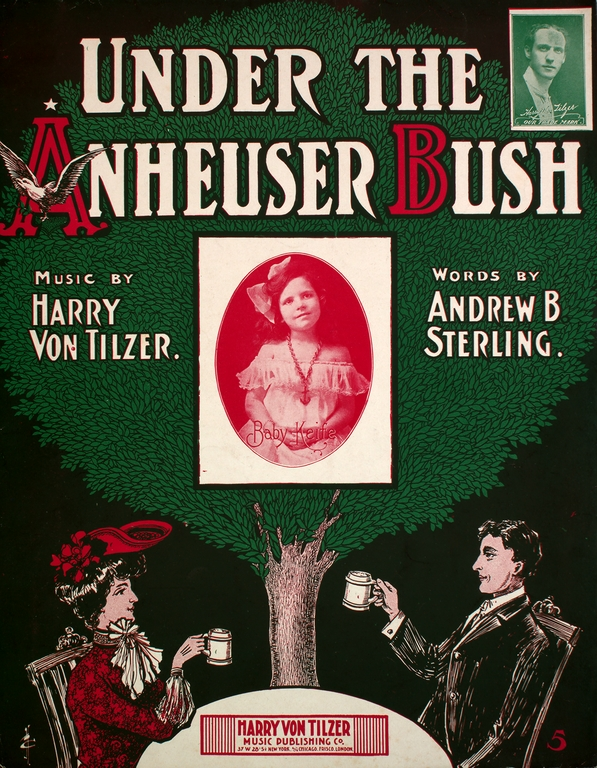
Sheet music cover stylized with Anheuser-Busch logo (1903)

Published by the Harry Von Tilzer Music Pub. Co., it followed on the success of Von Tilzer's 1902 beer garden composition, "Down Where The Wurzburger Flows".

The chorus lyrics below are as printed in the 1903 sheet music. The line "come and have a stein or two" is backed by the first bar of the German folk standard "Oh du lieber Augustin".

Come, come, come and make eyes with me
Under the Anheuser Bush
Come, come drink some "Budwise" with me
Under the Anheuser Bush

Hear the old German band... [followed by a bar of "Oh du lieber Augustin"]
Just let me hold your hand – Yah!
Do, do come and have a stein or two
Under the Anheuser Bush

Popular recordings were made by Billy Murray (1904), and as a duet by Collins and Harlan (1905). In the MGM movie Meet Me in St. Louis, set in 1903, the orchestra at the Christmas dance plays an instrumental version.

The song was adapted for a British music hall version called "Down at the Old Bull and Bush", written for Florrie Forde and made popular by her. (Note: The Old Bull and Bush is a north London public house—now a Grade II-listed landmark with a bar named in Forde's honor.)

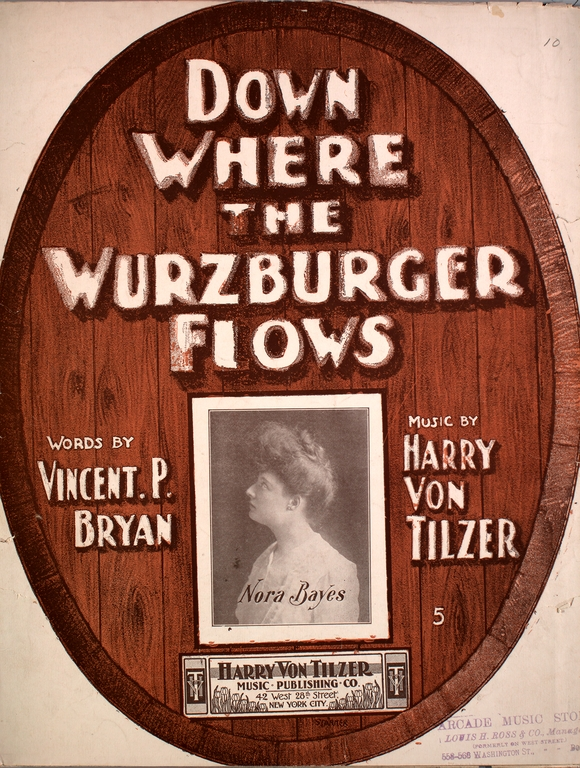
Where the Wurzburger Flows was a beer garden hit for Von Tilzer in 1902

The tune was adapted for the political parody song "Down At The Old Watergate" during the Watergate scandal.
