= You and I (Jeff Buckley album) =

Compilation album by Jeff Buckley
- Released: March 11, 2016
- Recorded: February 1993
- Genre: Alternative rock; folk rock; indie rock
- Length: 52:14
- Label: Legacy

Jeff Buckley chronology
The Jeff Buckley Collection (2010)	You and I (2016)

Singles from You and I
- 1. "Everyday People" Released: November 12, 2015; 2. "Just Like a Woman" Released: January 13, 2016; 3. "I Know It's Over" Released: February 11, 2016

You and I is a compilation album by Jeff Buckley, released on March 11, 2016, on Legacy Recordings. The songs were recorded in 1993 and represent some of his earliest recordings for Columbia. The album consists mainly of cover songs.

== Background and composition ==
The sessions for the album took place in February 1993 and were designed to produce what A&R rep Steve Berkowitz referred to as a "Table of Contents" for the singer. The 2016 release of the album marks the first time these session recordings have been made available to the public. According to his mother, Buckley was insecure about the sessions, leading him to make several calls to her during the middle of the night about fears of being fired.

In addition to several cover songs the album also features two original Buckley compositions; an early demo of "Grace" which would later appear on Buckley's debut album of the same name and "Dream of You and I". Album producer Steve Addabbo had opined that, at that stage of his career, Buckley may have been so adept at covers that he had difficulty coming up with his own material.

More material from these February 1993 sessions was later featured on the LP "In Transition" released on Record Store Day 2019.

== Commercial performance ==
The album debuted at No. 58 on the Billboard 200, No. 5 on the Top Rock Albums and No. 1 on the Folk Albums charts, selling 9,000 copies on its first week of release.

== Track listing ==
You and I track listing
No.	Title	Writer(s)	Original artist(s)	Length
1.	"Just Like a Woman"	Bob Dylan	Dylan	6:28
2.	"Everyday People"	Sly Stone	Sly and the Family Stone	4:32
3.	"Don't Let the Sun Catch You Cryin'"	Joe Greene	Louis Jordan and His Tympany Five	4:02
4.	"Grace" (first studio recording)	Jeff Buckley; Gary Lucas	Buckley	6:11
5.	"Calling You"	Bob Telson	Jevetta Steele	4:59
6.	"Dream of You and I"	Buckley	Buckley	4:30
7.	"The Boy with the Thorn in His Side"	Johnny Marr; Morrissey	The Smiths	3:34
8.	"Poor Boy Long Way from Home"	Traditional	Bukka White	6:02
9.	"Night Flight"	John Paul Jones; Jimmy Page; Robert Plant	Led Zeppelin	4:54
10.	"I Know It's Over"	Marr; Morrissey	The Smiths	7:02
Total length:				52:14

Expanded Edition
No.	Title	Writer(s)	Original artist(s)	Length
11.	"Mojo Pin"	Buckley; Gary Lucas	Buckley	7:03
12.	"Unforgiven (aka Last Goodbye)"	Buckley	Buckley	4:10
13.	"Strawberry Street"	Buckley; Andrew Goodsight; John McNally	Buckley	5:22
14.	"Je n'en connais pas la fin"	Raymond Asso; Marguerite Monnot	Édith Piaf	5:28
15.	"Hallelujah"	Leonard Cohen	Leonard Cohen	7:10
16.	"If You Knew"	Nina Simone	Nina Simone	3:39
17.	"A Satisfied Mind"	Joe Hayes; Jack Rhodes		3:39

== Charts ==
Chart performance for You and I
Chart (2016)	Peak position
Australian Albums (ARIA)	2
Austrian Albums (Ö3 Austria)	43
Belgian Albums (Ultratop Flanders)	16
Belgian Albums (Ultratop Wallonia)	23
Dutch Albums (Album Top 100)	12
French Albums (SNEP)	17
German Albums (Offizielle Top 100)	85
Irish Albums (IRMA)	22
Italian Albums (FIMI)	12
New Zealand Albums (RMNZ)	15
Portuguese Albums (AFP)	8
Swiss Albums (Schweizer Hitparade)	38
UK Albums (OCC)	16
US Billboard 200	58
