= The Queen Is Dead =

Studio album by the Smiths
- Released: 16 June 1986
- Recorded: July–December 1985
- Studios: Jacobs (Farnham, Surrey); RAK (London); Drone (Manchester)
- Genres: Indie rock; jangle pop; post-punk
- Length: 36:48
- Label: Rough Trade
- Producers: Morrissey; Johnny Marr

The Smiths chronology
Meat Is Murder (1985)	The Queen Is Dead (1986)	The World Won't Listen (1987)

Singles from The Queen Is Dead
- 1. "The Boy with the Thorn in His Side" Released: 16 September 1985; 2. "Bigmouth Strikes Again" Released: 19 May 1986; 3. "Some Girls Are Bigger Than Others" Released: October 1986 (Germany only); 4. "There Is a Light That Never Goes Out" Released: 1987 (France), 12 October 1992 (UK & Europe); 5. "The Queen Is Dead" Released: 16 June 2017

The Queen Is Dead is the third studio album by the English rock band the Smiths, released on 16 June 1986 by Rough Trade Records. Following the release of their second album Meat Is Murder, the Smiths retreated to Greater Manchester to begin work on new material, with Johnny Marr and Morrissey writing extensively at Marr's home in Bowdon as the band sought to escape the pressures of London and their label Rough Trade. The album was produced by Morrissey and Marr, with engineering by Stephen Street; its music blends indie rock and post-punk. Recording for the album took place between July 1985 and December of that year, with sessions held at RAK Studios in London, Jacobs Studios in Farnham and Drone Studios in Manchester.

The Queen Is Dead spent 22 weeks on the UK Albums Chart, peaking at number two. It reached number 70 on the US Billboard Top Pop Albums chart and was certified Gold by the Recording Industry Association of America (RIAA) in late 1990. The album received widespread critical acclaim, praised for Marr's guitar work and Morrissey's witty and emotional lyricism. It has been included in multiple lists of the greatest albums of all time. Rolling Stone ranked the album 113th on its 2020-updated list of the "500 Greatest Albums of All Time". In its 2013 list, NME named The Queen Is Dead the greatest album of all time.

== Background ==
Following the completion of Meat Is Murder in December 1984, guitarist Johnny Marr began developing new ideas for the Smiths' next album. In early 1985, the band returned to Greater Manchester, with Morrissey settling in Hale and Marr purchasing a home in Bowdon; the latter served as a writing base for the band. Marr described this period as an attempt to "shut out the outside world" and focus creatively, distancing themselves from the pressures of London and their record label. Drummer Mike Joyce likened Marr's home to a personal Brill Building due to the creative intensity. During this time, Morrissey channeled his frustrations with the media and music industry into lyrics.

== Recording and production ==
The Queen Is Dead was developed over a period of more than eighteen months, from its earliest musical sketches to its release. The album was produced by Morrissey and Marr, working predominantly with engineer Stephen Street, who had engineered the band's 1985 album Meat Is Murder. The three shared a strong bond in the studio, helped by their similar ages and interests, which created a relaxed atmosphere. At the time the band was having difficulty with its record label Rough Trade Records. However, according to Street, "this didn't get in the way of recording because the atmosphere in the studio was very, very constructive". The first song from the album to be completed, "The Boy with the Thorn in His Side", was recorded at Drone Studios in Manchester in July 1985. Marr later recalled composing the song's melody while riding a bus during the Meat Is Murder tour. "Frankly, Mr. Shankly", "I Know It's Over" and "There Is a Light That Never Goes Out" were written by Morrissey and Marr in a "marathon" writing session in the late summer of 1985 at Marr's home in Bowdon.

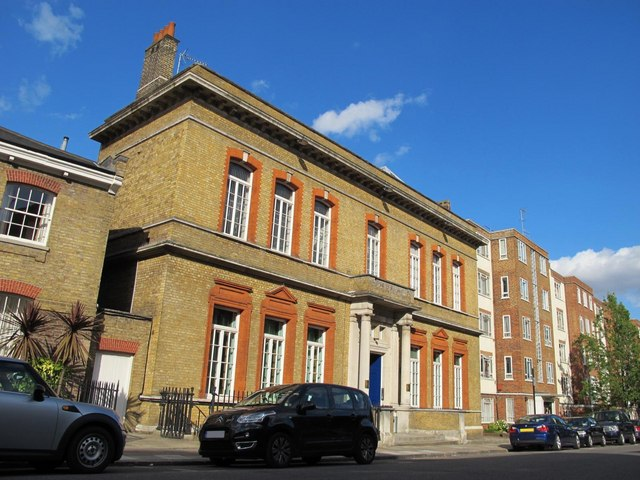
RAK Studios building in 2011

In August 1985, "Bigmouth Strikes Again" and "Some Girls Are Bigger Than Others" were recorded at RAK Studios in London, along with the B-sides to "The Boy with the Thorn in His Side"; "Asleep" and "Rubber Ring". Kirsty MacColl sang a backing vocal for "Bigmouth Strikes Again" but her take was deemed to be "really weird" by Marr, and was replaced with a sped-up vocal by Morrissey in the final mix, processed by Street who ran his voice through a harmoniser. The same vocal manipulation was performed for "The Queen Is Dead", and both were attributed to "Ann Coates" on the record sleeve (Ancoats is a district in Manchester, just north-east of the city centre). Morrissey liked to experiment with effects on his voice, but he rarely used backing vocals or harmonies aside from the harmoniser, though he enjoyed experimenting during sessions. "Some Girls Are Bigger Than Others" has an opening which fades in, out, and back again. This effect was devised by Street, who aimed to create a mix that sounded similar to a door closing and opening again.

During the same session, a first version of "Never Had No One Ever" was recorded. The said track, completed in August 1985, was based on an instrumental demo which Marr had recorded in December 1984. Marr described the track's atmosphere as representative of the album's overall mood and recording experience. According to Marr, "Cemetry Gates" originated during an informal writing session in his kitchen with Morrissey. Marr recalled that he was uncertain about the song and had considered discarding it, but Morrissey responded enthusiastically. Marr described the creative process as coming together "effortlessly and easy". "The Boy with the Thorn in His Side", "Bigmouth Strikes Again" and "Frankly, Mr. Shankly" were debuted live during a tour of Scotland in September and October 1985, while "The Queen Is Dead" and "There Is a Light That Never Goes Out" were played during a soundcheck.

The bulk of the album was recorded in the winter of 1985 at Jacobs Studios in Farnham, under the working title "Margaret on the Guillotine", which was later used for Morrissey's song about Margaret Thatcher from his 1988 album Viva Hate. "Frankly, Mr. Shankly" was an attempt to recreate the "vibe" of Sandie Shaw's "Puppet on a String", although "it didn't quite work out that way", according to Marr. Linda McCartney was asked to play piano on the track, but declined, and a first take featuring a trumpeter was scrapped. A technical fault on the tape rendered the first completed version of the song unusable, and so it was re-recorded with John Porter at Wessex Studios in London. "The Queen Is Dead" was among the last songs to be recorded. Its distinctive tom-tom loop was created by Joyce and Street using a sampler. A line of guitar feedback was played by Marr through a wah-wah pedal throughout the song. The album was shortly completed before Christmas 1985.

=== Title and cover ===
The album title is taken from American writer Hubert Selby Jr.'s 1964 novel, Last Exit to Brooklyn. The cover of The Queen Is Dead features a still of French actor Alain Delon from the 1964 film The Unvanquished. Delon granted permission for the image's use, though according to Morrissey's Autobiography, the actor mentioned that his parents were dismayed by the album's title.

== Musical style ==
"There Is a Light That Never Goes Out"
A sample of the ninth track "There Is a Light That Never Goes Out", sung by Morrissey.

Music critics have categorised The Queen Is Dead as an indie rock, jangle pop and post-punk recording. Marr was heavily influenced by the Stooges and the Rolling Stones while crafting the album. A central thematic tension in the album is the interplay between melancholy and other emotions. Humour, anger and joy are also notable concepts throughout the album. Mark Lindores praised Morrissey's lyrics for their wit and sensitivity, noting his ability to craft both humorous and genuinely moving lines. Pitchfork's Simon Reynolds noticed that Morrissey's lyrics were inspired by both surreal humour and black comedy. The album addresses a distinct criticism of the United Kingdom. According to Kevin Korber of PopMatters, Morrissey's writing has largely centred on two themes: himself and the United Kingdom. He often portrays himself as a misunderstood figure at odds with a world that fails to comprehend him. Marr notes that the album captures the progressive and the "night time" side of the Smiths.

The album's opener and title track "The Queen Is Dead" was based on a song Marr began writing as a teenager. Influenced by the Velvet Underground and the Detroit garage rock scene, it is strongly anti-monarchist, portraying the royal family as "useless, taxpayer-funded tabloid fodder", according to Korber. "Frankly, Mr. Shankly" functions as a "meta" reflection on Morrissey's position within the music business, featuring a self-aware admission of his "insatiable lust for attention". This is captured in lines such as "Fame, fame, fatal fame / It can play hideous tricks on the brain", and his declaration that he would "rather be famous than righteous or holy". Lyrically, "I Know It's Over" shares elements with the two mentioned ballads: the suicidal connotations of "The Queen Is Dead" and the agonising diary of many mornings waking up alone of "Frankly, Mr. Shankly". Despite what Simon Goddard described as Morrissey's "obvious depression", the song retains some hope in its message, stating that being "kind and gentle" is a noble trait that requires rare courage, and that love is "natural and real", even if not for Morrissey, whose unfulfilled heart's desire is further tormented by the sight of "loutish lovers" taking their partners for granted.

The composition for "Never Had No One Ever" was based on the song "I Need Somebody" by the Stooges. The lyric to the song reflects Morrissey's feeling unsafe and, being from an immigrant family, not at home on the streets of Manchester. In interviews, he explained that the song expresses the frustration he felt at age 20, when he found himself unable to feel at ease or at home in the very streets where he had been born and raised. Musically, the track was composed by Marr, who sought to evoke a mood that was both "beautiful and dark", inspired by his teenage experiences listening to Raw Power by the Stooges. "Cemetry Gates" features what NME described as a light, "jaunty pop backing", which Street has described as a "nice bit of blessed relief" within the broader flow of The Queen Is Dead. Reynolds said that it retains a sense of emotional strength and is characterised as "sprightly and carefree". The lyrics focus on "plagiarists receiv[ing] the sharp lash of the Morrissey tongue".

The track "Bigmouth Strikes Again" is driven by fast drum rolls, which give it what has been described by Korber as a "shot of punk adrenaline". Lyrically, Morrissey criticises the media and society, presenting himself as a martyr, with Reynolds saying there is a "hint of reveling in the martyr posture". This theme is underscored by imagery evoking the execution of Joan of Arc by fire. "The Boy with the Thorn in His Side" presents Morrissey's recurring theme of being misunderstood, this time framed in more universal terms. Described by NME as one of his most poetic moments, the lyrics refer allegorically to the band's experience of the music industry that failed to appreciate it. It also reflects a self-perception of rejection, encapsulated in the line: "How can they hear me say those words and still they don't believe me?" "Vicar in a Tutu" centres on a cross-dressing clergyman, with Terence Cawley of The Boston Globe noting its "casual dismissal of gender norms", further describing as "sneakily subversive". Musically, the song features musical elements characteristic of the music hall tradition with Korber describing it as a "slight-yet-enjoyable rockabilly pastiche".

"There Is a Light That Never Goes Out" features lyrics drawn from "Lonely Planet Boy" by the New York Dolls. According to Marr: "When we first played it, I thought it was the best song I'd ever heard". Reynolds interpreted Morrissey's depiction of doomed love and romanticised death, highlighted by the iconic image of being hit by a double-decker bus, as evoking sincere yearning without lapsing into parody. It is grouped with other emotionally intense tracks such as "I Know It's Over" and described as part of the album's "life-and-death serious stuff", contributing to what Louder called the band's impression of being "simultaneously in love with both life and death". The song's guitar part drew on the Rolling Stones' cover of Marvin Gaye's "Hitch Hike", whose original version by Gaye himself had acted as an inspiration for the Velvet Underground's "There She Goes Again". "Some Girls Are Bigger Than Others" features lyrics that Morrissey described as a deliberate reduction of meaning, intended to highlight, in his words, "the basic absurdity of recognising the contours of one's body".

== Release ==
Promotional photograph of the Smiths in 1985. The same photo is used in the album's inner gatefold.

Although The Queen Is Dead was initially planned for a February 1986 release, tensions with Rough Trade delayed it, with it eventually releasing on 16 June 1986. A legal dispute with Rough Trade had delayed the album by almost seven months, and Marr was beginning to feel the stress of the band's exhausting touring and recording schedule. He later told NME, "'Worse for wear' wasn't the half of it: I was extremely ill. By the time the tour actually finished it was all getting a little bit ... dangerous. I was just drinking more than I could handle".

The album's release was preceded by the singles "The Boy with the Thorn in His Side", released on 16 September 1985, and "Bigmouth Strikes Again", on 19 May 1986. "The Boy with the Thorn in His Side" was initially intended as a demo, but was considered by the band to be good enough for release as a single. The Queen Is Dead would become the last Smiths album supported by a tour. Many at Rough Trade favoured releasing "There Is a Light That Never Goes Out" as the lead single, but Marr insisted on "Bigmouth Strikes Again", believing it was a more energetic and striking choice that better represented the band's sound. "There Is a Light That Never Goes Out" was not released as a single until 12 October 1992, five years after their split, to promote the compilation album ...Best II.

"The Queen Is Dead" was accompanied by an expressionistic music video directed by Derek Jarman, starts with a sampled excerpt from Bryan Forbes' 1962 British film The L-Shaped Room. Mayo Thompson from the band Red Krayola was an associate producer for the film and through working for Rough Trade persuaded Jarman to direct a promotional video for the Smiths. The album became a commercial success upon release, spending 22 weeks on the UK Albums Chart, peaking at number two. It spent 21 weeks on the European Albums Chart, peaking at number 19 based on the sales from 18 major European countries. It also reached number 70 on the US Billboard 200 chart, and was certified Gold by the RIAA in late 1990.

In June 2017, one year after the album's 30th anniversary, the Smiths issued a single of "The Queen Is Dead" with "Oscillate Wildly", "Money Changes Everything", and "The Draize Train" as B-sides on 12" vinyl. The band also released a 7" single containing "The Queen is Dead" and "I Keep Mine Hidden". Later that month, Morrissey accused HMV of trying to "freeze sales" on the new re-issues after the store limited the number of records sold to one per person. Later in 2017, the album was re-released as a deluxe reissue on Warner Bros. Records including new studio takes of "There's a Light That Never Goes Out" and "Rubber Ring" as well as a previously unheard live album recorded in 1986. In a press release for the re-issue Morrissey said of the album: "You progress only when you wonder if an abnormally scientific genius would approve – and this is the leap The Smiths took with The Queen Is Dead".

== Reception ==
=== Critical response ===
Professional ratings
Retrospective reviews
Aggregate scores
Source	Rating
Metacritic	99/100 (deluxe edition)
Review scores
Source	Rating
AllMusic	5/5 stars
Blender	5/5 stars
Chicago Tribune	3/4 stars
The Encyclopedia of Popular Music	5/5 stars
Mojo	5/5 stars
Pitchfork	10/10
Q	5/5 stars
Rolling Stone	5/5 stars
The Rolling Stone Album Guide	5/5 stars
Uncut	5/5 stars
The Village Voice	B+

The Queen Is Dead has received acclaim from critics. At Metacritic, which assigns a weighted average rating out of 100 to reviews from mainstream critics, the deluxe version of The Queen Is Dead received a rating of 99 out of 100 based on eleven critic reviews, indicating "universal acclaim".

From contemporary reviews, Mark Coleman of Rolling Stone gave the album an overwhelmingly positive review, remarking on Morrissey's sense of humour and singling out the singer's performance on "Cemetry Gates" as a highlight, and concluded that "like it or not, this guy's going to be around for a while". Writing in British pop magazine Smash Hits, Tom Hibbert praised the guitar work and lyricism, describing Morrissey as "half genius half buffoon", while the other musical elements sound "like scratchings on a Fifth Form desk". Stephen Dalton, writing for Uncut, described the album as the Smiths' "most confident and coherent album yet" despite the escalating internal friction within the band. In a mixed review, Robert Christgau of The Village Voice wrote that despite his dislike of the Smiths' previous albums, he held an "instant attraction" to The Queen Is Dead, where he found consolation in Morrissey's frank witty lyrics, "dishing the queen like Johnny Rotten never did and kissing off a day-job boss who's no Mr. Sellack", which "makes it easier to go along on his moonier escapades". J. D. Considine found that the band "epitomize[s] all that is admirable and annoying about British new music" finding the Smith's material to be "terrifically tuneful" due to Marr's "incisive, visceral guitar work", but felt that Morrissey "had a tendency to wander away from conventional notions of pitch often mangling the band's melodies in the process".

In retrospective reviews, Pitchfork writer Simon Reynolds described The Queen Is Dead as a masterpiece marking the Smiths' "imperial phase". He highlighted Morrissey's "idiosyncratic" and "grandly moving" lyrics and delivery, alongside Johnny Marr's "sparkling" melodies and intricate arrangements. He observed that, for true believers, the album cemented the Smiths' status as "the greatest group in the world" despite their struggle to gain widespread commercial success at the time, and positioned Morrissey as a "spurned savior" of British music. Stephen Thomas Erlewine, writing for AllMusic, described it as the Smiths' "great leap forward", showing their ascent to new musical and lyrical heights. He noted that while the album was "harder-rocking" than previous efforts, it did not conform to conventional rock structures. Instead, Johnny Marr's "dense web of guitars" created a variety of moods.

=== Legacy ===
In 2000, The Queen Is Dead was voted number 10 in Colin Larkin's All Time Top 1000 Albums. In 2002, Pitchfork listed The Queen Is Dead as the sixth-best album of the 1980s. In 2003, the album was ranked number 216 on Rolling Stone's list of the "500 Greatest Albums of All Time", 218 in a 2012 revised list, and 113 in the 2020 revision. NME named it the second-greatest British album of all time in its 2006 list. In 2006, Q magazine placed the album at number three in its list of "40 Best Albums of the '80s". The album was included in Spin Alternative Record Guide, a reference book part of the American Spin magazine. It was reviewed by Rob Sheffield, who gave the album a total score of ten. English-based magazine Clash added The Queen Is Dead to its "Classic Album Hall of Fame" in its June 2011 issue, saying it "is an album to lose yourself in; it has depth, focus and some great tunes. It's easy to see why the album is held in such high esteem by Smiths fanatics and why, a decade later, it became a key influence for all things Britpop".

In 2012, Slant Magazine listed the album at number 16 on its list of "Best Albums of the 1980s" and said: "There may never again be an indie-rock album as good as The Queen Is Dead". In 2013, it was ranked the greatest record of all time on the NME's "Greatest Albums of All Time" list. At Rolling Stone, Gavin Edwards retrospectively viewed the album as "one of the funniest rock albums ever", noting that Morrissey had "learned to express his self-loathing through mockery" while Marr "matched his verbal excess with witty, supple music", and concluded, "If the queen's reaction to Morrissey was 'We are not amused,' then she was the only one".

In 2016, Paste magazine named the album as the second-best post-punk album of all time. Staff writer Jay Sweet explained: "What truly makes this definitive album a benchmark is it marks the fall of the insufferable decade of synth music that preceded it and the second coming of the British Invasion with guitarist Johnny Marr's penchant for high-timbre guitar riffs and sonic urgency."

In 2024, the album was listed at number 66 by Apple Music in their "100 Best Albums" list.

== Track listing ==
All lyrics are written by Morrissey; all music is composed by Johnny Marr.

Side one
No.	Title	Length
1.	"The Queen Is Dead" (includes "Take Me Back to Dear Old Blighty" (medley))	6:24
2.	"Frankly, Mr. Shankly"	2:17
3.	"I Know It's Over"	5:47
4.	"Never Had No One Ever"	3:36
5.	"Cemetry Gates"	2:38

Side two
No.	Title	Length
6.	"Bigmouth Strikes Again"	3:11
7.	"The Boy with the Thorn in His Side"	3:15
8.	"Vicar in a Tutu"	2:22
9.	"There Is a Light That Never Goes Out"	4:02
10.	"Some Girls Are Bigger Than Others"	3:16
Total length:		36:48

2017 collector's edition

Disc one features the 2017 master of the album. Disc four DVD features the 2017 master in 96 kHz / 24-bit PCM stereo.

Disc two: Additional recordings
No.	Title	Length
1.	"The Queen Is Dead" (full version)	7:14
2.	"Frankly, Mr. Shankly" (demo)	2:18
3.	"I Know It's Over" (demo)	5:49
4.	"Never Had No One Ever" (demo)	4:41
5.	"Cemetry Gates" (demo)	3:01
6.	"Bigmouth Strikes Again" (demo)	3:07
7.	"Some Girls Are Bigger Than Others" (demo)	3:57
8.	"The Boy with the Thorn in His Side" (demo mix)	3:19
9.	"There Is a Light That Never Goes Out" (take 1)	4:25
10.	"Rubber Ring" (single B-side)	3:54
11.	"Asleep" (single B-side)	4:02
12.	"Money Changes Everything" (single B-side)	4:42
13.	"Unloveable" (single B-side)	3:55
Total length:		54:24

Disc three: Live in Boston
No.	Title	Length
1.	"How Soon Is Now?"	5:25
2.	"Hand in Glove"	2:58
3.	"I Want the One I Can't Have"	3:24
4.	"Never Had No One Ever"	3:26
5.	"Stretch Out and Wait"	3:12
6.	"The Boy with the Thorn in His Side"	3:34
7.	"Cemetry Gates"	3:01
8.	"Rubber Ring / What She Said / Rubber Ring"	4:17
9.	"Is It Really So Strange?"	3:22
10.	"There Is a Light That Never Goes Out"	4:09
11.	"That Joke Isn't Funny Anymore"	4:51
12.	"The Queen Is Dead"	5:05
13.	"I Know It's Over"	7:36
Total length:		54:14

Disc four – DVD: The Queen Is Dead – A Film by Derek Jarman
No.	Title	Length
11.	"The Queen Is Dead"	6:28
12.	"There Is a Light That Never Goes Out"	4:03
13.	"Panic"	2:18
Total length:		12:49

== Personnel ==
Credits are adapted from the album's liner notes.

The Smiths

- Morrissey – lead vocals, backing vocals ("Bigmouth Strikes Again"; credited as Ann Coates)
- Johnny Marr – guitars, sampler, marimba ("The Boy with the Thorn in His Side"), orchestration
- Andy Rourke – bass guitar
- Mike Joyce – drums

Production

- Morrissey – production
- Johnny Marr – production
- Stephen Street – engineering (except "Frankly, Mr. Shankly"), drum sampling ("The Queen Is Dead")
- John Porter – engineering ("Frankly, Mr. Shankly")

Design

- Steve Wright – group photography
- Morrissey – sleeve
- Caryn Gough – layout

== Charts ==
=== Weekly charts ===
Weekly charts
Chart (1986)	Peak position
Australian Albums (Kent Music Report)	30
Canadian Albums (RPM)	29
Dutch Albums (Album Top 100)	11
European Top 100 Albums	19
German Albums (Offizielle Top 100)	45
New Zealand Albums (RMNZ)	17
Swedish Albums (Sverigetopplistan)	39
UK Albums Chart	2
UK Independent Albums	1
US Billboard 200	70
US Cash Box	129

Weekly charts
Chart (2017)	Peak position
German Albums	33
Greek Albums (IFPI Greece)	11

Weekly charts
Chart (2024)	Peak position
Croatian International Albums (HDU)	2

Weekly charts
Chart (2026)	Peak position
Argentine Albums (CAPIF)	6

== Certifications ==
Certifications for The Queen Is Dead
Region	Certification	Certified units/sales
Brazil (Pro-Música Brasil)	Gold	100,000^{*}
Italy (FIMI) sales since 2009	Platinum	50,000^{‡}
Spain (Promusicae)	Gold	50,000^{^}
United Kingdom (BPI)	2× Platinum	600,000^{‡}
United States (RIAA)	Gold	500,000^{^}
^{*} Sales figures based on certification alone.^{^} Shipments figures based on certification alone.^{‡} Sales+streaming figures based on certification alone.

== See also ==
- List of 1980s albums considered the best

== Sources ==
- Goddard, Simon (2009). Mozipedia: The Encyclopedia of Morrissey and The Smiths. London: Ebury Press. ISBN 978-0091927103.
- Rogan, Johnny (1994). The Smiths: The Visual Documentary. Omnibus. ISBN 978-0-7119-3337-8.
- Rogan, Johnny (1993) [1992]. Morrissey and Marr: The Severed Alliance. Omnibus. ISBN 0-7119-3000-7.
