= Jumbo Records =

Record label

- Founded: 1908
- Country of origin: United Kingdom

Jumbo Records was a record label set up in Britain in 1908 as a subsidiary of the Italian company Fonotipia. The 10-inch 78 rpm records were initially manufactured in Frankfurt (Oder) for marketing in the UK, and then in Tonbridge, Kent, but in 1913 manufacturing moved to a new factory at Hertford.

The label released popular recordings by military bands, orchestras, solo singers, and many music hall performers of the time, including George Formby Sr., Ella Retford, Billy Williams, and Vesta Tilley.

Early releases were of international recordings, but the company then set up its own recording studio in Hamsell Street, London. With the outbreak of the First World War, the company became solely reliant on recordings made in Britain, and in 1917 its properties in the UK were acquired by the Columbia Graphophone Company. The Jumbo label continued for some time, but in 1918 the label was renamed Venus Records.
