= Bennett Scott =

English writer (1871–1930)

Bennett Scott (12 October 1871 – 1 June 1930) was an English writer of music hall songs.

Born in London, of Jewish background, he started working in warehouses, but in 1894 advertised his services as a provider of "good songs and catchy melodies... at a guinea a time." His first major success came with "I've Made Up My Mind to Sail Away" (1902), sung by Tom Costello. He established a working partnership with fellow songwriter A. J. Mills. They set up the Star Music Company, and together wrote "By the Side of the Zuider Zee" (1906, performed by Fanny Fields); "Ship Ahoy! (All the Nice Girls Love a Sailor)" (1908, performed by Hetty King), "Fall In and Follow Me" (1910, performed by Whit Cunliffe), "When I Take My Morning Promenade" (1912, performed by Marie Lloyd), and "Take Me Back to Dear Old Blighty" (1916, performed by Florrie Forde).

Scott died in 1930, aged 68. His brother, Maurice Scott, also worked as a songwriter.
