= A. J. Mills (songwriter) =

English lyricist (1872–1919)

Arthur John Mills (1872–1919) was an English lyricist of music hall songs, many written with Fred Godfrey and Bennett Scott.

== Biography ==
He was born in Richmond, Surrey. His early popular successes as a songwriter included "What-Ho! She Bumps" (1901) and "Just Like The Ivy (I'll Cling To You)" (1903), both written with Harry Castling. He then established a working partnership with Scott, setting up the Star Music Company, publishing one new song every week. Their most successful songs included "By The Side Of the Zuider Zee" (with Scott, 1906), "Ship Ahoy! (All the Nice Girls Love a Sailor)" (with Scott, 1908), "Fall In and Follow Me" (with Scott, 1910), "When I Take My Morning Promenade" (with Scott, 1912), "Take Me Back to Dear Old Blighty" (with Scott and Godfrey, 1916), and "Down Texas Way" (with Scott and Godfrey, 1917). Mills, Scott and Godfrey also provided the songs for the 1916 show Three Weeks And A Bit.

Mills died in Westcliff-on-Sea, Essex, in October 1919.
