= William Henry Broadhead =

English theatre builder

- Born: 21 September 1848; Mansfield, Nottinghamshire, England
- Died: 12 April 1931 (aged 82); Blackpool, Lancashire, England
- Burial place: Layton cemetery, Blackpool
- Occupations: theatre builder and owner
- Known for: developing music halls and later cinemas in the north west of England
- Notable work: Broadhead circuit of theatres
- Spouse: Mary Ann Birch

William Henry Broadhead (21 September 1848 – 12 April 1931) was an English theatre builder and owner who was prominent in developing music halls and later cinemas in the north west of England in the late 19th and early 20th centuries.

== Biography ==
According to his death notice and some sources he was born in Mansfield, Nottinghamshire, though other sources give his birthplace as Birmingham or Staffordshire. In his youth he lived in various cities with his parents, and became apprenticed to a firm of builders. By 1870, he had settled in Manchester, where he married Mary Ann Birch and set up business as a joiner, decorator, and builder. The business prospered, but by 1883 his health started to deteriorate and he took medical advice to move to the coast, settling in Blackpool.

There, he took a lease on the Prince of Wales Baths in 1885, turning it into an aquatic theatre, with later performances directed by his son, William Birch Broadhead (1873–1907). After the lease on the baths expired in 1896, W. H. Broadhead became a member of Blackpool Council and was involved in the development of Blackpool Tower. Working with his sons W. B. Broadhead and Percy Broadhead (1878–1955), he started to develop a string of theatres in and around Manchester, catering for "respectable" working-class patrons.

Starting with the Osborne Theatre in Manchester, the Broadheads built up a circuit of theatres in Manchester, Salford, Preston, Bury, Ashton-under-Lyne, and elsewhere, as well as larger entertainment complexes such as Morecambe Winter Gardens. By 1913, the circuit comprised 17 theatres and venues in the north west of England. They "made a significant contribution to working class amusements in both little-known and more popular areas", with a motto "Quick, Clean, Smart and Bright".

The Broadhead circuit of theatres helped establish the careers of many noted music hall and variety performers, including Billy Merson, Jack Pleasants, Harry Weldon, George Formby Sr., Billy Williams, Tom Foy, G. H. Elliott, and Gracie Fields. They also provided venues for such stars as Harry Houdini, Lillie Langtry, and Fred Karno's troupe featuring Charlie Chaplin.

William Henry Broadhead became a leading figure in Blackpool, where he "made his name as one of the men responsible for making the town into a hot spot for entertainment and variety". A member of the Liberal Party, he was mayor of Blackpool in 1905/06 and 1910/11, and was later elected as an alderman and a freeman of the borough.

Broadhead died in Blackpool in 1931 at the age of 82, and was buried in Layton cemetery. Several of the family's theatres were sold in 1932. Some fell into disarray as the popularity of movies grew, and some were converted into cinemas. In later years, many of the buildings were demolished, and those remaining – the Morecambe Winter Gardens, the Tameside Hippodrome (formerly the Hippodrome, in Ashton-under-Lyne), and the Hulme Hippodrome – are now unused and at risk of demolition.
