= Ella Retford =

English music hall entertainer (1885–1962)

- Born: Elinor Maud Flanagan; 2 July 1885; Sunderland, County Durham, England
- Died: 29 June 1962 (aged 76); London, England
- Other name: Elinor Maud Dawe
- Occupations: Singer, dancer, comedian, actress
- Known for: Music hall, pantomime, films
- Spouse: Thomas Dawe (1911-1928; his death)

Elinor Maud Dawe (née Flanagan, 2 July 1885 – 29 June 1962), who used the stage name Ella Retford, was an English music hall comedian, singer and dancer, and later a stage and film actress.

== Biography ==
She was born in Sunderland (not Ireland, as some sources suggest), and around 1900 moved to London where she performed in music hall shows, initially as a dancer. By 1906, she was established as a performer in revues and pantomimes, often playing the part of principal boy. Theatre historian W. J. MacQueen-Pope called her "probably the best 'Aladdin' ever seen in pantomime... She was sparkle and grace personified and her dancing was a joy..". The Sheffield Evening Telegraph said of her: "Miss Ella Retford’s powers as a comedienne are well-known to patrons of halls. But she excels herself. Possessing a fine voice, with certain peculiarities which impart a kind of naivete to her singing, she dances most gracefully, and displays capital elocutionary training".

She made recordings for Jumbo Records from 1908. In 1910 she made probably the first recording of the popular song "Ship Ahoy! (All the Nice Girls Love a Sailor)", and also recorded one of her most popular songs, "Molly O'Morgan", which was included in the 1946 British film Gaiety George and on the soundtrack of the 2017 film Wonder Woman. Her other successful songs included "Take Me on the Flip-flap", "Under the Honey Moon Tree", "Take Me Back to Dear Old Blighty", "She's a Lassie from Lancashire", and "We're All North Country Lads and Lassies". She re-recorded several of her songs as a medley on Regal Zonophone Records in 1930.

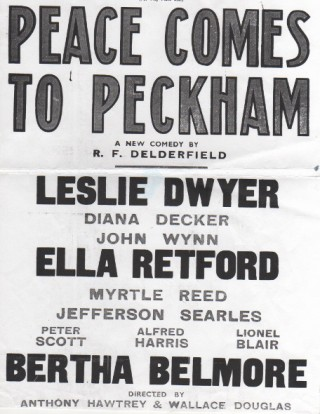
Peace Comes to Peckham in 1947 with Bertha Belmore and Lionel Blair

Retford appeared in Royal Variety Performances in 1912, 1921 and 1938. She also made film appearances as a character actress in Darby and Joan (1937), Poison Pen (1939), I'll Be Your Sweetheart (1945), Paper Orchid (1949), and Shadow of the Past (1950). She continued to perform on stage in pantomimes until 1949, and appeared in 1954 on BBC television as a judge in the contest Top Town.

She was married to Thomas Dawe, a stage manager with Fred Karno, from 1911 until his death in 1928. She died in London in 1962, aged 76.
