= St Columba's Church, Drumcliff =

St Columba's Church
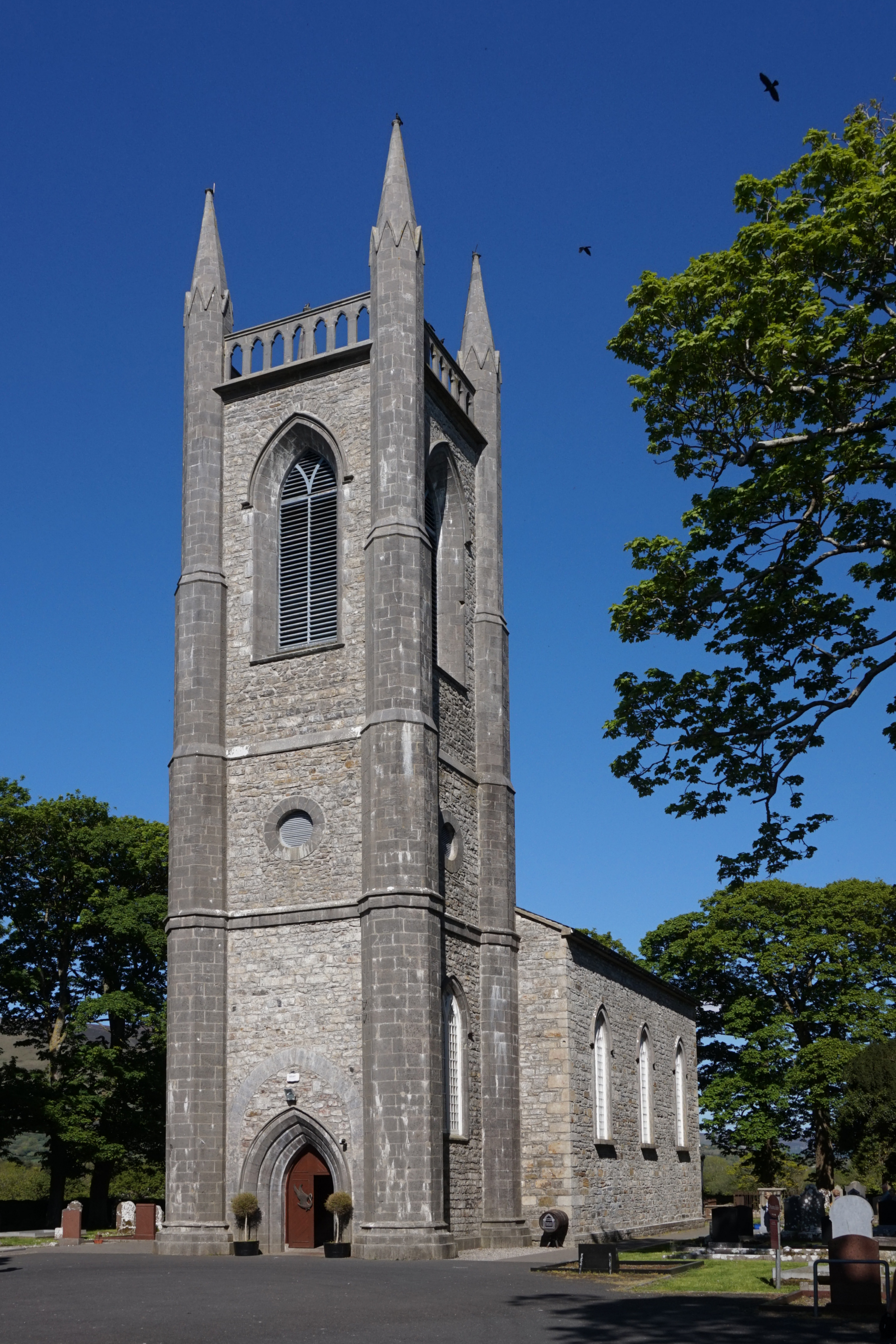
- St Columba's Church
- 54°19′34″N 8°29′36″W
- Location: Drumcliff, County Sligo
- Country: Ireland
- Denomination: Church of Ireland

History
- Status: Parish church
- Consecrated: 1809

Architecture
- Functional status: Active
- Style: Neo-Gothic

Specifications
- Materials: Limestone

Administration
- Province: Armagh
- Diocese: Kilmore, Elphin and Ardagh

Clergy
- Vicar: Rev. Luke Pratt

St Columba's Church is a parish church of the Church of Ireland, located in the village of Drumcliff, County Sligo. It is best known for its association with William Butler Yeats, who was buried in the churchyard in 1948, having previously been buried close to where he died, in France.

The church is also noted for being a fine example of neo-Gothic architecture, having been built using money from the Board of First Fruits in 1809.
