= Tameside Hippodrome =

Theatre in Ashton-under-Lyne, Greater Manchester, England

Coordinates: 53°29′16″N 2°5′50″W

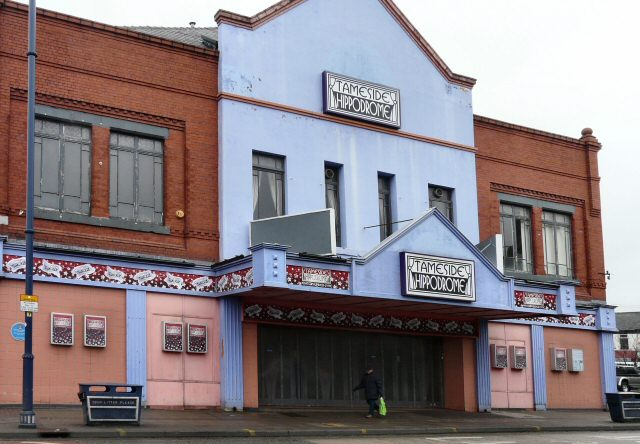
Tameside Hippodrome

Tameside Hippodrome is a 1262 seat theatre located in Ashton-under-Lyne, Greater Manchester, England.

== History ==
In February 1904, William Henry Broadhead, who already owned three theatres in the Manchester area, acquired land in Ashton-under-Lyne bordered by Oldham Road, Cotton Street East, Gas Street and Old Street. By April plans had been submitted to Ashton Borough Council to build a 2,000 capacity theatre on the corner bordered by Oldham Road and Cotton Street East. The plans were passed in May 1904 and work began immediately.

William H Broadhead began his working life as a builder and joiner. Even when one of his daughters (Annie) married in 1902, by which time he owned the Royal Osborne, the Metropole, the Grand Junction and the Hulme Hippodrome, with a total capacity across all four theatres exceeding 10,000, his occupation on the marriage certificate is "Decorator". His own company therefore built the Hippodrome, lock stock and barrel. He even had a specialist section which produced the coloured glass signs for the cast iron canopy

The theatre opened with a civic gala evening on 19 November 1904 and a full variety programme commenced the following Monday.

In 1932, it was converted to a temporary cinema, the auditorium and front-of-house area were gutted and the circle, gallery and boxes replaced by a 600-seat cantilevered circle. The decor was changed to the Art Deco style and a central pediment added to the front of the building.The architects for this re-design were Drury & Gomersall of Manchester. Renamed The New Empire it re-opened in November 1933 by which time it had twice changed hands. Put up for auction in early 1933, in order to fund the death duties arising from the death of William H Broadhead in 1931, it was bought by a Stockport partnership then quickly acquired by Union Cinemas, who were responsible for adding the streamlined canopy at the front of the building and for the vertical signage. In 1937 it passed to ABC Cinemas when they acquired the Union business. It retained its original branding, though, and wasn't renamed "ABC" until 1964.

Following an attempt to convert it into a bingo hall, a 21-year lease was bought by Tameside Council, and the theatre was relaunched as Tameside Theatre in 1976. The building was bought by the council in 1983.

In 1992, a contract to manage the theatre was given to Apollo Leisure (who were subsequently bought by Live Nation).

== Temporary closure ==
In 2007, Tameside Council began the tendering process for the management of the theatre. The incumbent operator, Live Nation, did not take part. The company later submitted a bid outside the tender process, for a fee of double their existing rate. Live Nation followed their initial offer by offering to run the theatre free of charge until a new management was found. This offer was declined by the council.

A council statement said that it was unaffordable, and that the offer did not take into account required investment in the theatre. No contract was awarded and the theatre subsequently closed on 1 April 2008. Tameside Council were seeking funding for the refurbishment for the theatre, a sustainable business model for it and a new operator. The council have stated that the theatre will not reopen until such a time that this has been done.

On 6 September 2009, it was reported that the Hippodrome would be torn down. No new buyers came forward for the building or to take it over as a working theatre. In 2009 the Tameside Hippodrome was recognised by Historic England as being worthy of Grade II listing " The Tameside Hippodrome retains its double-height auditorium undivided, and with its particular Art Deco scheme substantially intact, retaining a rich period character which evokes the inter-war glamour and escapism of the genre. * The foyer and first-floor crush lounge and cafeteria, now the theatre bar, which were remodelled in the 1930s refit of this 1904 theatre, retain 1930s Art Deco plasterwork detailing which complements the auditorium. * The 1930s Art Deco scheme to its interior is by the architects' practice of Drury and Gomersall who specialised in cinema architecture * It is a good example of an Edwardian theatre later converted to cinema usage, which is becoming rare."

== Reopening ==
In June 2012, it was announced that the theatre would reopen in 2013, operated by a charitable trust; this was confirmed in August 2016. In 2021 the TMBC listed the building for disposal and in 2022 indicated that their hope was that it would be re-opened as a theatre by a suitable operator as part of the planned redevelopment of the area. This was confirmed by Councillor David Sweeton in a BBC Radio Manchester interview on 13 February 2023
