= Florrie Forde =

Australian singer (1875–1940)

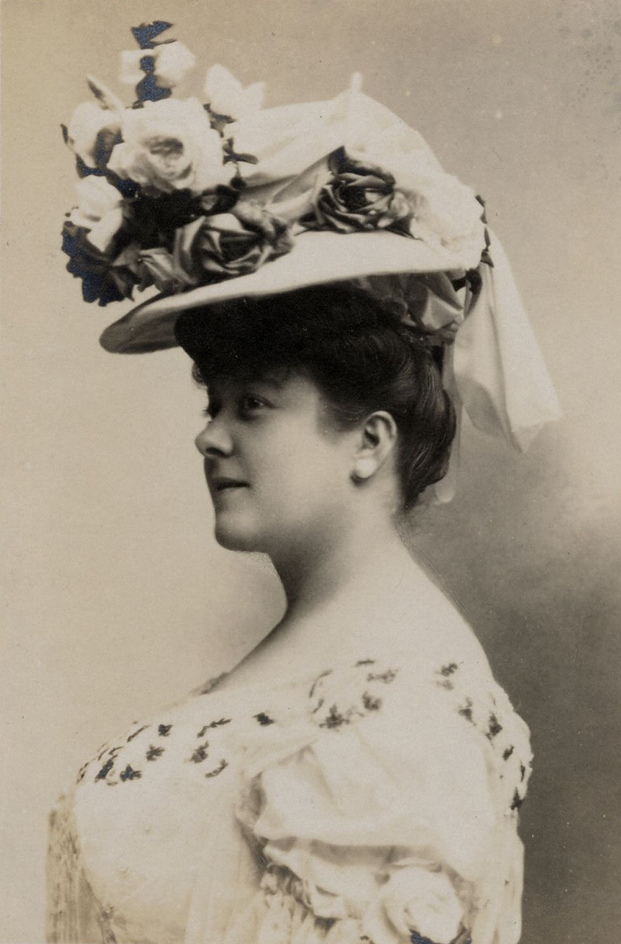
- Florrie Forde by George Henry Hana
- Born: Flora May Flannagan; 16 August 1875; Fitzroy, Victoria, Australia
- Died: 18 April 1940 (aged 64); Aberdeen, Scotland
- Occupations: Singer, entertainer
- Known for: Chorus songs
- Notable work: "Hold Your Hand Out, Naughty Boy"
- Spouses: Walter Emanuel Bew (1893–?); Laurence Barnett (1905–1934) his death

Florrie Forde (born Flora May Augusta Flannagan; 16 August 1875 – 18 April 1940) was an Australian-born British vaudevillian performer and popular singer, notable in music hall and pantomime. From 1897 she lived and worked in the United Kingdom, where she found her greatest success, as one of the most popular stars of the early 20th century as a music hall entertainer and recording artist.

== Early life and career ==
Forde was born in Fitzroy, Victoria, on 16 August 1875. She was the sixth of the eight children of Irish-born Lott Flannagan, a stonemason, and Phoebe (née Simmons), who also had two children from a prior marriage. By 1878, her parents had separated. Phoebe married Thomas Ford, a theatrical costumier in 1888. Forde and some of her siblings were placed in a convent. At the age of sixteen, she ran away to live with an aunt in Sydney. When she appeared on the local music hall stage, she adopted her stepfather's surname but added an 'e'.

According to The Sydney Morning Herald's reviewer, at one of her earliest vaudeville performances in January 1892, "[i]n the first part the vocalists were all well received, and several had to respond to encores. The serio-comic song by Miss Florrie Ford, 'Yes, You Are,' proved a great attraction." Another of her earliest vaudeville performances was in February 1892 at Polytechnic Music Hall in Pitt Street. She toured widely in Australia over the next few years, performing as a soubrette, or in pantomimes as a "principal boy".

== Success in Britain ==
At the age of 21, in 1897, she left for London. On August Bank Holiday 1897, she made her first appearances in London at three music halls – the South London Palace, the Pavilion and the Oxford – in the course of one evening, and became an immediate star. Forde had a powerful stage presence, and specialised in songs that had memorable choruses in which the audience was encouraged to join. She was soon drawing top billing, singing songs such as "Down at the Old Bull and Bush" and "Has Anybody Here Seen Kelly?". She appeared in the very first Royal Variety Performance in 1912.

At the height of her popularity during World War I, her songs were some of the best known of the period, including "Pack Up Your Troubles in Your Old Kit-Bag", "It's A Long Way To Tipperary" and "Take Me Back to Dear Old Blighty". She was described by W. J. MacQueen-Pope as the "female epitome of music hall gusto; she controlled an audience, she made them sing, she had memorable songs and nobody ever sang those songs as she could". Theatre historian Roy Busby described her as "a fine buxom woman, splendid in feathers, sequins and tights." She made the first of her many sound recordings in 1903 and in all made 700 individual recordings by 1936.

She ran her own touring revue company, which provided a platform for new rising stars, the most famous being the singing duo of Flanagan and Allen.

For 36 consecutive years Forde performed for a summer season at Douglas, Isle of Man, where she appeared at the Derby Castle Ballroom and became widely loved for her support of local charities and personal acts on benevolence.

It was during the course of her summer season on the Isle of Man in 1927 that having been made aware of the body of an unknown British sailor who had been washed ashore at Peel in 1918, and who was buried in Kirk Patrick Churchyard, that she paid for a white marble headstone for the grave of the unknown sailor and on which is inscribed:

"Some Mother's Son. Erected by Florrie Forde, 1927."

She continued to appear in London pantomimes as a principal boy into the 1930s, when she was in her sixties, and performed in the 1935 Royal Variety Performance. At the start of the Second World War, she planned to continue to entertain the troops.

== Personal life and death ==
On 2 January 1893 in Sydney, she married Walter Emanuel Bew, a 31-year-old police constable. On 22 November 1905 at the register office, Paddington, London, as Flora Augusta Flanagan, spinster, she married Laurence Barnett (d. 1934), an art dealer.

She collapsed and died from a cerebral haemorrhage after singing for troops in Aberdeen, Scotland, on 18 April 1940; she was 64.

== Legacy ==
The Anglo-Irish poet Louis MacNeice left a tribute to her in a poem, 'Death of an Actress', recalling how:

With an elephantine shimmy and a sugared wink
She threw a trellis of Dorothy Perkins roses
Around an audience come from slum and suburb
And weary of the tea-leaves in the sink.

She is buried in Streatham Park Cemetery, London.

== National Film and Sound Archive ==
"Hold your hand out, naughty boy" by Florrie Forde in 1913

Florrie Forde's song "Hold Your Hand Out, Naughty Boy" was added to the National Film and Sound Archive's Sounds of Australia registry in 2013.

== Selected songs ==
"'Tis a faded picture" sung by Florrie Forde in 1910

- "Down at the Old Bull and Bush"
- "She's a Lassie from Lancashire"
- "Oh! Oh! Antonio!"
- "Has Anybody Here Seen Kelly?"
- "Flanagan"
- "Take Me Back to Dear Old Blighty"
- "Hold Your Hand Out, Naughty Boy"
- "Good-bye-ee!"
- "A Bird in a Gilded Cage"
- "Daisy Bell"
- "I Do Like to Be Beside the Seaside"
- "Now I Have to Call him Father"
- "Pack Up Your Troubles in Your Old Kit Bag"
- "It's a Long Way to Tipperary"

== Selected filmography ==
- My Old Dutch (1934)
- Say It with Flowers (1934)
