= Fred Godfrey (songwriter) =

Welsh songwriter (1880–1953)

- Born: Llewellyn Williams; 17 September 1880; Swansea, Wales
- Died: 22 February 1953 (aged 72); Pinner, London, England
- Occupation: Songwriter
- Spouse: Bertha Lloyd
- Writing career
- Pen name: Eddie Stamper, Don Grahame, Edward E. Elton
- Genre: Music

Fred Godfrey (17 September 1880 – 22 February 1953) was the pen name of Llewellyn Williams, a World War I songwriter. He is best known for the songs "Take Me Back to Dear Old Blighty" (1916) and "Bless 'Em All" (1917), which became a 1940s hit when recorded by George Formby and which can be found on many war films.

== Early life ==
Williams was born on 17 September 1880 in Swansea. He was one of the sons of Robert Williams, an auctioneer, and Maria Jane Knight, a sailor's daughter. They had married in 1864 in Caernarvon.

On 1 July 1901 he married Bertha Lloyd. One of her cousins was Collie Knox, a well-known Daily Mail journalist of the 1930s and 1940s. Her older brother, Charles Ellis Lloyd was a Welsh novelist. The wedding was in Treherbert, after which they moved to 6 Streatham Place, London. They had four children.

== Career ==
Between 1900 and 1953 he wrote over 800 songs.

Godfrey could write and arrange music as well as write lyrics. He also played the piano. He began selling songs around 1906, with his first success a year later, when he teamed up with lyricist Harry Castling to produce two songs, which Billy Williams later recorded successfully. From 1911 until 1915, nearly every one of Williams' songs was composed by Godfrey. He also wrote songs for Florrie Forde, Mark Sheridan, Dorothy Ward, Shaun Glenville, Ella Retford and Vesta Victoria. Godfrey was only paid a few guineas for each song, a common amount at the time. Godfrey was not business-minded and generally sold his songs outright, as was usual at this time, rather than receiving royalties.

During World War I, he gained a reputation as a writer of war songs. His song "Take Me Back to Dear Old Blighty" was recorded by Dorothy Ward in 1916 and quickly became a hit. On 26 January 1917 he was conscripted into the Royal Naval Air Service. He was transferred to the Royal Air Force in 1918, who released him from service to continue songwriting. In 1917, while he was away in the RNAS, "Down Texas Way", a song he had written the year, before was published and become a success. He is also credited with writing the lyric for "Bless 'Em All" in 1917.

After World War I popular music styles changed, and he became less successful.

In 1930 he played in a variety act featuring his hit songs with Irish tenor Tom Finglass. The act was a success, but Godfrey could not keep to the schedule, and the act soon folded. In the late 1930s, his old-fashioned comic song style appealed to movie actor George Formby and radio's "Gert and Daisy". Comedian Max Miller's 1938 film Everything Happens to Me featured two, including the title song.

In October 1939, Godfrey's wife died from cancer at the age of 59.

In November 1940, Formby's recording of "Bless 'Em All" was released. After World War I, it had become a kind of unofficial anthem of the RAF. The recording was an immediate success and Formby recorded a second version in early 1941, with new lyrics by Godfrey.

Godfrey spent his last years living with his eldest daughter in the North London suburb of Pinner. He died in a London hospital in 1953, still writing new song ideas. He is buried in Pinner New Cemetery. His will left £202.
