= Rank (album) =

Live album by the Smiths
- Released: 5 September 1988
- Recorded: 23 October 1986
- Genres: Alternative rock; indie pop
- Length: 55:56
- Label: Rough Trade
- Producers: Pete Dauncey and Grant Showbiz

The Smiths chronology
Stop Me (1988)	Rank (1988)	The Peel Sessions (1988)

Professional ratings
Review scores
Source	Rating
AllMusic	3.5/5 stars
Blender	2/5 stars
Chicago Tribune	3.5/4 stars
Christgau's Record Guide	B
NME	10/10
Pitchfork	5.4/10
Q	5/5 stars
Rolling Stone	3/5 stars
Select	4/5
Uncut	4/5 stars

Rank is the only official live album by the English band the Smiths. It was released in September 1988, a year after the band's breakup, through Rough Trade Records, and reached No. 2 in the British charts. In the US, the album was released on Sire Records and made No. 77.

== Background ==
Rank was released as a contractual obligation. It was recorded almost two years earlier on 23 October 1986 at National Ballroom in Kilburn, London, and is a fourteen-track distillation (of 20 songs) by singer Morrissey from the complete concert recording that had earlier been transmitted by BBC Radio 1. The album rode high on the Smiths nostalgia and the success of Morrissey's debut solo album, Viva Hate, earlier the same year.

The songs omitted from the recording of the Kilburn show are: "I Want the One I Can't Have", "There Is a Light That Never Goes Out", "Frankly, Mr. Shankly", "Never Had No One Ever", "Meat Is Murder", and "How Soon Is Now?" Also, some edits can be readily heard in the concert itself, such as at the end of "I Know It's Over" when the crowd starts cheering. In late 2008 video footage appeared from the show on YouTube.

According to the Smiths biographers Johnny Rogan and David Bret, Morrissey originally titled the album The Smiths in Heat. Rough Trade objected and Morrissey proposed Rank, "as in 'J. Arthur'" (J. Arthur Rank is Cockney rhyming slang for "wank").

== Packaging ==
The album cover for Rank, designed by Morrissey, is a photo of actress Alexandra Bastedo. The image is from photographer John D. Green's 1967 book Birds of Britain. The gatefold album's interior features a photo of several Smiths fans ripping apart Morrissey's shirt. That picture was taken by Ian Tilton at the 1986 Factory Records "Festival of the Tenth Summer" concert at G-Mex Centre in Manchester, England.

== Track listing ==
All tracks written by Johnny Marr and Morrissey except "His Latest Flame" (Doc Pomus, Mort Shuman), "The Draize Train" (Marr) and the very beginning of "The Queen Is Dead" where an audio recording of Sergei Prokofiev's classical piece "Montagues and Capulets" was played to introduce the band.

Side one
No.	Title	Length
1.	"The Queen Is Dead"	4:11
2.	"Panic"	3:07
3.	"Vicar in a Tutu"	2:40
4.	"Ask"	3:12
5.	"His Latest Flame/Rusholme Ruffians" (Medley)	3:55
6.	"The Boy with the Thorn in His Side"	3:47
7.	"Rubber Ring/What She Said" (Medley)	3:41

Side two
No.	Title	Length
8.	"Is It Really So Strange?"	3:45
9.	"Cemetry Gates"	2:50
10.	"London"	2:38
11.	"I Know It's Over"	7:49
12.	"The Draize Train"	4:23
13.	"Still Ill"	4:09
14.	"Bigmouth Strikes Again"	5:51

== Personnel ==
=== The Smiths ===
- Morrissey – vocals
- Johnny Marr – lead guitar
- Andy Rourke – bass guitar
- Mike Joyce – drums
- Craig Gannon – rhythm guitar

=== Technical staff ===
- Pete Dauncey, Grant Showbiz – producers
- Paul Nickson – engineer

== Charts ==
Chart performance for Rank
Chart (1988)	Peak position
Australian Albums (ARIA)	33
Dutch Albums (Album Top 100)	54
German Albums (Offizielle Top 100)	47
New Zealand Albums (RMNZ)	25
Swedish Albums (Sverigetopplistan)	32
UK Albums (Official Charts)	2
US Billboard 200	77
