= Simon Goddard =

British music journalist (born 1971)

Simon Goddard (born Cardiff, 21 December 1971) is a British author and music journalist latterly known for his Bowie Odyssey book series, having written more books on David Bowie than any other author.

== Early life ==
Goddard was born in Wales and later moved to Scotland. Though a writer by profession, Goddard originally went to art school in Carlisle, then Hull, and briefly considered a career in visual media.

== Career ==
In 1995 Goddard directed his one and only pop promo for Edwyn Collins, the subject of one of his future books, Simply Thrilled,

He started freelance writing the following year and eventually found regular work as a music journalist in London.

Goddard's first two books, Songs That Saved Your Life and Mozipedia, established his initial reputation in the '00s as an authority on the Smiths and their lead singer Morrissey. The latter was voted Book of the Year by readers of Mojo magazine and has since been published in America by Plume, and in Brazil by Leya. Since 2010 Goddard's writing style and choice of subjects has greatly diversified, including the first biography of Postcard Records (Simply Thrilled, 2014), a picaresque homage to the Rolling Stones (Rollaresque, 2015), and 2018's novelistic The Comeback telling the story of Elvis Presley and his 1968 Comeback Special. The latter made both Q and Mojo magazines' Music Books of the Year lists.

In 2020 Goddard began his Bowie Odyssey series with Omnibus Press, chronicling the life of David Bowie against the cultural and social history of the 1970s, year-by-year. The first and fifth volumes, Bowie Odyssey 70 and Bowie Odyssey 74, have both been Sunday Times Music Books of the Year. The fourth in the series, Bowie Odyssey 73, was a 2023 Mojo Book of the Year, while the sixth, Bowie Odyssey 75, was named 2025 Book of the Year by Classic Pop magazine.

As a freelance journalist, Goddard's work has appeared in Uncut, Mojo, Record Collector and newspapers including The Guardian and The Mail on Sunday. In 2006 he joined Q magazine where he remained a Contributing Editor until it ceased publication in July 2020. Goddard has also supplied the accompanying essays to rock photographer Tom Sheehan's collection The Cure: Pictures of You (a 2022 Rough Trade Book of the Year) and written sleevenotes for reissues and boxsets by Orange Juice, Siouxsie and the Banshees, Nico, Soft Cell, and James.

In 2024 he collaborated with Buzzcocks guitarist and singer Steve Diggle on his memoir Autonomy – Portrait of a Buzzcock.

== Bibliography ==
- Songs That Saved Your Life – The Art of The Smiths 1982-87 (2002; revised edition 2013, Titan Books; as Canciones que te salvaron la vida: The Smiths 1982-87, 2024, Ondas del Espacio, Spanish edition)
- Mozipedia – The Encyclopedia of Morrissey and The Smiths (2009, Ebury Press; 2010, Plume/Penguin, USA; 2013, Leya, Brazil/Portuguese edition)
- Ziggyology – A Brief History of Ziggy Stardust (2013, Ebury Press; as David Bowie: A Construção de Ziggy Stardust, 2022, Editora Belas-Letras, Brazil/Portuguese edition; as Ziggyología: La breve historia de David Bowie y Ziggy Stardust, 2025, Ondas del Espacio, Spanish edition)
- Simply Thrilled – The Preposterous Story of Postcard Records (2014, Ebury Press)
- Rollaresque – (Or) The Rakish Progress of The Rolling Stones (2015, Ebury Press)
- The Comeback – Elvis and the Story of the 68 Special (2018, Omnibus Press)
- (Co-written with Steve Diggle) Autonomy – Portrait of a Buzzcock (2024, Omnibus Press)

=== The Bowie Odyssey series ===
1. Bowie Odyssey 70 (2020)
2. Bowie Odyssey 71 (2021)
3. Bowie Odyssey 72 (2022)
4. Bowie Odyssey 73 (2023)
5. Bowie Odyssey 74 (2024)
6. Bowie Odyssey 75 (2025)
7. Bowie Odyssey 76 (2026)

All of the above published in the UK by Omnibus Press. Books 1-3 published in Germany by Hannibal Verlag.
