= The Smiths discography =

Discography of English rock band the Smiths

- Logo of the Smiths
- Studio albums: 4
- Extended plays: 2
- Live albums: 1
- Compilation albums: 11
- Singles: 25
- Video albums: 1

The English alternative rock band the Smiths released four studio albums, one live album, 11 compilation albums, two extended plays (EPs), 25 singles and one video album on the Rough Trade, Sire and WEA record labels. The band was formed in 1982 in Manchester by vocalist Morrissey, guitarist Johnny Marr, bass player Andy Rourke and drummer Mike Joyce.

The Smiths' debut single was "Hand in Glove" (May 1983); it failed to chart. Its follow-up, "This Charming Man" (October 1983), met with critical approval and reached number 25 on the UK Singles Chart. In 1984 the band reached number 12 in the UK with the single "What Difference Does It Make?" and went to number two on the UK Albums Chart with their debut album, The Smiths. Their next three singles all went into the top 20 of the charts in the UK, helping to consolidate their previous chart success. The next studio album, Meat Is Murder (1985), reached the top of the British charts; the only single to be released from the album, "That Joke Isn't Funny Anymore" (1985), failed to break into the UK Top 40. The Smiths' next six singles all made the top 30 in the UK, and their third album, The Queen Is Dead (1986), climbed to number two in the UK.

Despite the Smiths' chart success, Marr left the group in August 1987 because of a strained relationship with Morrissey. Failing to find a replacement, the Smiths disbanded by the time of the release of their final studio album, Strangeways, Here We Come, in September that year. Strangeways, Here We Come climbed to number two in the UK and became the band's highest-charting release in the United States when it reached number 55 on the Billboard 200. During their time together, as well as four studio albums, the Smiths also released three compilation albums (Hatful of Hollow, The World Won't Listen and Louder Than Bombs), while the live album Rank, recorded in 1986, was released in 1988 a year after the band split. In early 1992 WEA acquired the entire back catalogue of the Smiths and produced two compilations – Best I and Best II – the first of which went to the top of the UK Albums Chart. The following year, 1993, WEA re-released the four studio albums, Rank and the three earlier compilation albums. WEA released two further singles compilations in 1995 and 2001, with a further compilation, The Sound of The Smiths, released in November 2008.

== Albums ==
=== Studio albums ===
List of studio albums, with selected details, chart positions and certifications
Title	Album details	Peak chart positions										Certifications (sales thresholds)
Title	Album details	UK	UK Indie	AUS	CAN	GER	NLD	NZ	SWE	US	US Cash Box	Certifications (sales thresholds)
The Smiths	Released: 20 February 1984; Label: Rough Trade; Formats: LP, cassette, CD	2	1	77	65	—	28	9	44	150	129	BPI: Gold
Meat Is Murder	Released: 11 February 1985; Label: Rough Trade; Formats: LP, cassette, CD	1	1	58	40	45	39	13	27	110	73	BPI: Gold
The Queen Is Dead	Released: 16 June 1986; Label: Rough Trade; Formats: LP, cassette, CD	2	1	30	29	33	11	17	39	70	59	BPI: 2× Platinum; RIAA: Gold
Strangeways, Here We Come	Released: 28 September 1987; Label: Rough Trade; Formats: LP, cassette, CD	2	1	28	27	33	20	14	13	55	29	BPI: Gold; RIAA: Gold

=== Live albums ===
List of live albums, with selected details, chart positions and certifications
Title	Album details	Peak chart positions										Certifications (sales thresholds)
Title	Album details	UK	UK Indie	AUS	CAN	GER	NLD	NZ	SWE	US	US Cash Box	Certifications (sales thresholds)
Rank	Released: 5 September 1988; Label: Rough Trade, Sire; Formats: LP, cassette, CD, DAT	2	1	33	82	47	42	25	32	77	54	BPI: Gold

=== Compilation albums ===
List of compilation albums, with selected details, chart positions and certifications
Title	Album details	Peak chart positions										Certifications (sales thresholds)
Title	Album details	UK	AUS	CAN	GER	IRL	NLD	NZ	NOR	SWE	US	Certifications (sales thresholds)
Hatful of Hollow	Released: 12 November 1984; Label: Rough Trade; Formats: LP, cassette, CD	7	—	91	—	—	—	21	—	28	—	BPI: Platinum
The World Won't Listen	Released: 23 February 1987; Label: Rough Trade; Formats: LP, cassette, CD	2	25	—	41	—	15	16	17	19	—	BPI: Gold
Louder Than Bombs	Released: 30 March 1987; Labels: Rough Trade, Sire; Formats: LP, cassette, CD	38	—	30	—	—	—	—	—	—	62	BPI: Gold; RIAA: Gold
Stop Me	Released: 21 January 1988 (Japan only); Label: RCA Victor; Formats: CD	—	—	—	—	—	—	—	—	—	—	
Best I	Released: 17 August 1992; Label: WEA; Formats: LP, cassette, CD	1	64	36	—	56	74	15	35	45	139	BPI: Gold
Best II	Released: 2 November 1992; Label: WEA; Formats: LP, cassette, CD	29	190	—	—	—	—	—	—	—	—	BPI: Gold
Singles	Released: 20 February 1995; Label: WEA; Format: CD	5	134	—	—	26	—	—	—	—	—	BPI: Platinum
The Very Best of The Smiths	Released: 4 June 2001; Label: WEA; Format: CD	30	—	—	—	34	—	—	—	—	—	BPI: Platinum
The Sound of The Smiths	Released: 10 November 2008; Label: WEA; Format: CD	21	114	—	—	28	—	—	—	—	98	BPI: 3× Platinum
The Smiths Singles Box	Released: 8 December 2008; Label: WEA; Formats: 12 × 7" vinyl, 12 × CD	—	—	—	—	—	—	—	—	—	—	
Complete	Released: 26 September 2011 3 October 2011; Label: Rhino; Formats: 8 × CD, 8 × LP, 8 × CD + 8 × LP + 25 × 7" vinyl + DVD	63	—	—	—	75	—	—	—	—	—	
"—" denotes releases that did not chart.

== Extended plays ==
List of EPs, with selected chart positions
Title	EP details	Peak chart positions
Title	EP details	UK Indie
The 12" Mixes	Released: 1988; Label: Rough Trade; Formats: cassette, CD	—
The Peel Sessions	Released: 1988; Label: Strange Fruit; Formats: 12-inch vinyl, CD	9

== Singles ==
List of singles as lead artist, with selected chart positions and certifications, showing year released and album name
Title	Year	Peak chart positions						Certifications	Album
Title	Year	UK	UK Indie	AUS	IRL	NZ	US Dance	Certifications	Album
"Hand in Glove"	1983	—	3	—	—	—	—		Non-album single, this version later included on Hatful of Hollow, alternate version on The Smiths
"This Charming Man"	1983	8 (Note: "This Charming Man" peaked at No. 25 in 1983, but reached a new UK chart peak of No. 8 when reissued in 1992.)	1	52	9 (Note: "This Charming Man" did not chart in Ireland when first released in 1983, but peaked at No. 9 when reissued in 1992.)	15	—	BPI: 3× Platinum; RMNZ: 2× Platinum	Non-album single
"What Difference Does It Make?"	1984	12	1	—	12	—	—	BPI: Silver	The Smiths
"Heaven Knows I'm Miserable Now"	1984	10	1	—	11	—	—	BPI: Platinum; RMNZ: Platinum	Hatful of Hollow
"William, It Was Really Nothing"	1984	17	1	—	8	—	—		Hatful of Hollow
"How Soon Is Now?"	1985	16 (Note: "How Soon Is Now?" peaked at No. 24 in 1985, but reached a new UK chart peak of No. 16 when reissued in 1992.)	1	190	5	39	36	BPI: Platinum; RMNZ: Platinum	Hatful of Hollow
"Shakespeare's Sister"	1985	26	1	—	11	—	—		Non-album single later included on The World Won't Listen
"Barbarism Begins at Home"	1985	—	—	—	—	—	—		Meat Is Murder
"The Headmaster Ritual"	1985	—	—	—	—	—	—		Meat Is Murder
"That Joke Isn't Funny Anymore"	1985	49	1	—	20	—	—		Meat Is Murder
"The Boy with the Thorn in His Side"	1985	23	1	—	15	46	49	BPI: Silver	The Queen Is Dead
"Bigmouth Strikes Again"	1986	26	1	—	—	40	—	BPI: Platinum; RMNZ: Gold	The Queen Is Dead
"Some Girls Are Bigger Than Others"	1986	—	—	—	—	—	—		The Queen Is Dead
"Panic"	1986	11	1	—	7	—	—	BPI: Gold	The World Won't Listen
"Ask"	1986	14	1	—	9	—	—	BPI: Silver	The World Won't Listen
"Shoplifters of the World Unite"	1987	12	1	—	7	—	—		The World Won't Listen
"Sheila Take a Bow"	1987	10	1	—	3	—	—		Louder Than Bombs
"Girlfriend in a Coma"	1987	13	1	—	12	29	—		Strangeways, Here We Come
"I Started Something I Couldn't Finish"	1987	23	2	—	13	—	—		Strangeways, Here We Come
"Last Night I Dreamt That Somebody Loved Me"	1987	30	2	—	17	—	—		Strangeways, Here We Come
"Stop Me If You Think You've Heard This One Before"	1987	—	—	91	—	31	—		Strangeways, Here We Come
"There Is a Light That Never Goes Out"	1992	25	—	176	22	—	—	BPI: 2× Platinum; RMNZ: Platinum	The Queen Is Dead
"Sweet and Tender Hooligan"	1995	—	—	—	—	—	—		Louder Than Bombs
"The Boy with the Thorn in His Side" (demo mix)	2017	—	—	—	—	—	—	BPI: Silver	The Queen Is Dead (2017 collector's edition)
"The Queen Is Dead"	2017	85	—	—	—	—	—		The Queen Is Dead (2017 collector's edition)
"—" denotes that the recording did not chart or was not released in that territory.

== Other certified songs ==
List of other certified songs
Title	Year	Certifications	Album
"This Night Has Opened My Eyes"	2024	BPI: Silver; RMNZ: Gold	Hatful of Hollow / Louder Than Bombs
"Please, Please, Please, Let Me Get What I Want"	2025	BPI: Platinum; RMNZ: Gold	Hatful of Hollow / Louder Than Bombs
"Back to the Old House"	2025	BPI: Gold; RMNZ: Platinum	Hatful of Hollow / Louder Than Bombs
"I Know It's Over"	2025	BPI: Silver	The Queen Is Dead
"Asleep"	2025	BPI: Silver	The World Won’t Listen / Louder Than Bombs
"Cemetry Gates"	2026	BPI: Silver	The Queen Is Dead

== Other appearances ==
List of appearances on other albums and EPs
Title	Year	Album
"What She Said" (Live)	1985	NME Readers' Poll Winners '84 – four track various artists EP given away free with copies of NME magazine
"Bigmouth Strikes Again" (Live)	2013	The Old Grey Whistle Test: The Anthems

== Video albums ==
List of video albums, with selected details and certifications
Title	Album details	Certification
The Complete Picture	Label: WEA; Format: VHS / LaserDisc / DVD / VCD	UK: Platinum

== Music videos ==
List of music videos
Title	Year	Director(s)	Notes	Ref.
"This Charming Man"	1983			
"What Difference Does It Make?"	1984			
"Heaven Knows I'm Miserable Now"	1984			
"How Soon Is Now?"	1985	Paula Grief and Richard Levine		
"The Boy with the Thorn in His Side"	1985	Ken O'Neill		
"The Queen Is Dead"/"Panic"/"There Is a Light That Never Goes Out"	1986	Derek Jarman	A short film made for the 1986 Edinburgh Festival.	
"Panic"	1986	Derek Jarman	A promo video for the "Panic" single was made using a mixture of concert footage and footage from Jarman's film.	
"Ask"	1986	Derek Jarman		
"Shoplifters of the World Unite"	1987	Tamra Davis	Combines footage of The Smiths on The Tube in April 1987 with footage from the film A Place in the Sun.	
"Sheila Take a Bow"	1987	Tamra Davis		
"Girlfriend in a Coma"	1987	Tim Broad		
"Stop Me If You Think You've Heard This One Before"	1987	Tim Broad	Video produced for a single whose release was cancelled.	
"I Started Something I Couldn't Finish"	1987	Tim Broad	Promo video released after The Smiths had split, which recycles footage from the "Stop Me If You Think You've Heard This One Before" video.	
"This Charming Man"	1992	Unknown	Uses footage originally shot for the Tyne Tees Television show The Tube in 1983.	
"There Is a Light That Never Goes Out"	1992	Tim Broad	Recycles footage from the "Stop Me If You Think You've Heard This One Before" promo video.	

== Sources ==
- Fletcher, Tony (2012). A Light That Never Goes Out: The Enduring Saga of the Smiths. London: Random House. ISBN 978-1-4090-3860-3.
- Goddard, Simon (2002). Songs That Saved Your Life. London: Reynolds & Hearn. ISBN 978-1-903111-47-5.
- Goddard, Simon (2009). Mozipedia: The Encyclopaedia of Morrissey and the Smiths. London: Ebury Publishing. ISBN 978-0-09-192709-7.
- Kent, David (1993). Kent Music Report: Australian Chart Book 1970–1992. St Ives, N.S.W.: Australian Chart Book. ISBN 0-646-11917-6.
- Larkin, Colin (2011). The Encyclopedia of Popular Music. London: Omnibus Press. ISBN 978-0-85712-595-8.
- Rogan, Johnny (1993). Morrissey & Marr: The Severed Alliance. London: Omnibus. ISBN 978-0-7119-3000-1.
- Strong, Martin (2004). The Great Rock Discography. Edinburgh: Canongate Books. ISBN 978-1-84195-551-3.
- Zuberi, Nabeel (2001). Sounds English: Transnational Popular Music. Champaign, IL: University of Illinois Press. ISBN 978-0-252-02620-1.
