= List of songs recorded by the Smiths =

Songs recorded by the Smiths

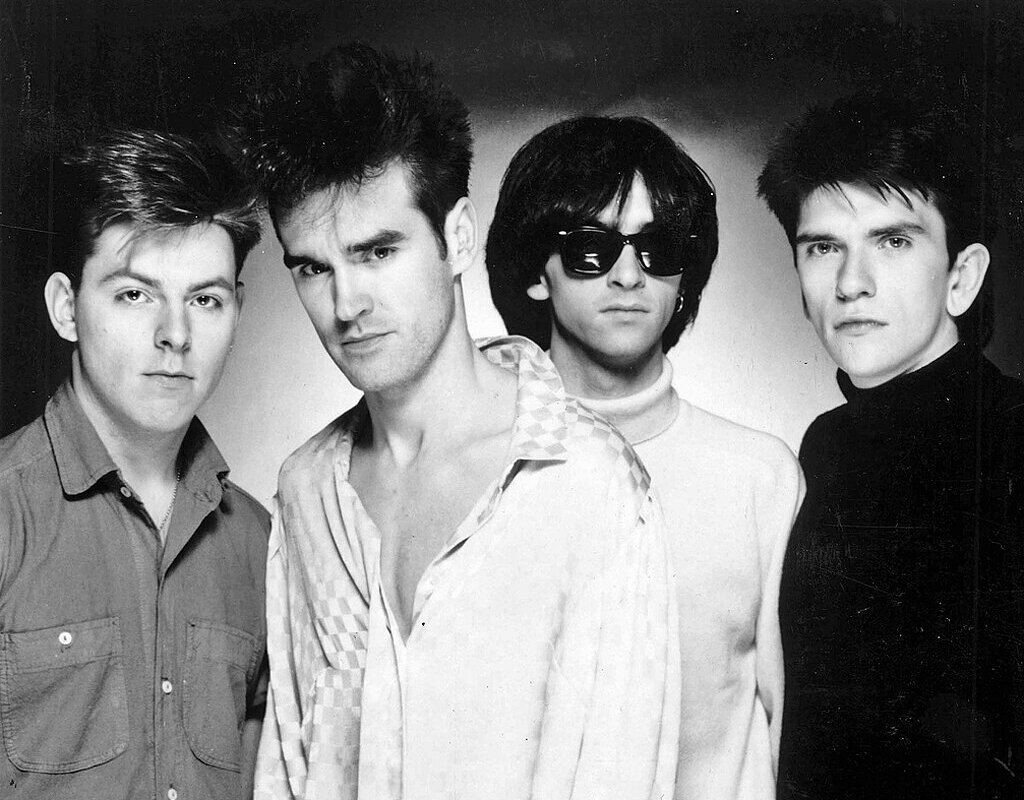
The Smiths in 1984. From left to right: Andy Rourke, Morrissey, Johnny Marr and Mike Joyce.

The English rock band the Smiths recorded 74 songs during their five-year career, which included 70 originals and 4 covers. Of their originals, three are instrumentals written solely by Marr, while the other 67 are credited to the songwriting team of Morrissey/Marr.

The band was formed in Manchester in 1982 and signed a one-off recording contract with independent record label Rough Trade Records, releasing their debut single, "Hand in Glove" in May 1983. The single found success in the UK, earning the group a full contract. Their follow-up singles, "This Charming Man" and "What Difference Does It Make?" fared better on the UK charts and helped increase the band's popularity. The next year saw the release of their self-titled debut album, several non-album singles, and Hatful of Hollow, a collection of B-sides, live recordings, and numerous non-album singles. The band's popularity increased with Meat Is Murder (1985), their only UK number one studio album, and The Queen Is Dead (1986), which reached number two on the UK charts and peaked in the US Top 100. Several non-album singles after Hatful of Hollow saw release on the compilations The World Won't Listen and Louder Than Bombs in early 1987. Despite their chart success, tensions began growing in the band, mainly between Marr and Morrissey and the band's label; the band announced their break-up shortly before the release of their final album, Strangeways, Here We Come. The live album Rank followed in 1988.

The majority of the Smiths' songs were written by the songwriting partnership of Morrissey and Johnny Marr. Throughout their career, their songs differed from the predominant synth-pop British sound of the early 1980s, instead fusing together 1960s rock and post-punk. In their early years, the band purposely rejected synthesisers and dance music, until Meat Is Murder, which contained keyboards as well as rockabilly and funk influences. The Queen Is Dead was notable for featuring harder-rocking songs with witty, satirical lyrics of British social mores, intellectualism and class. Throughout their career, Morrissey drew attention during interviews and live performances for his provocative statements, such as criticising the Thatcher administration and being pro-vegetarian, as shown in the title track of Meat Is Murder. The Smiths often addressed controversial topics in their lyrics, including homosexuality ("Hand in Glove") and the Moors murders ("Suffer Little Children"), as well as burning "the disco" and hanging "the DJ" ("Panic"). Since their breakup, the Smiths have been considered one of the most influential bands of the 1980s, with Ian Youngs of BBC News describing them as "the band that inspired deeper devotion than any British group since the Beatles."

== Songs ==
Key
‡	Song released as a single
†	Song not written by Johnny Marr and Morrissey
#	Song originally released as a B-side

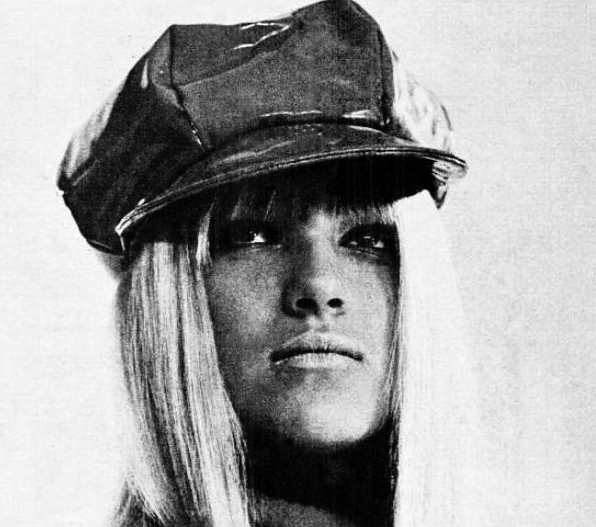
The Smiths covered Twinkle's song "Golden Lights" in 1986.

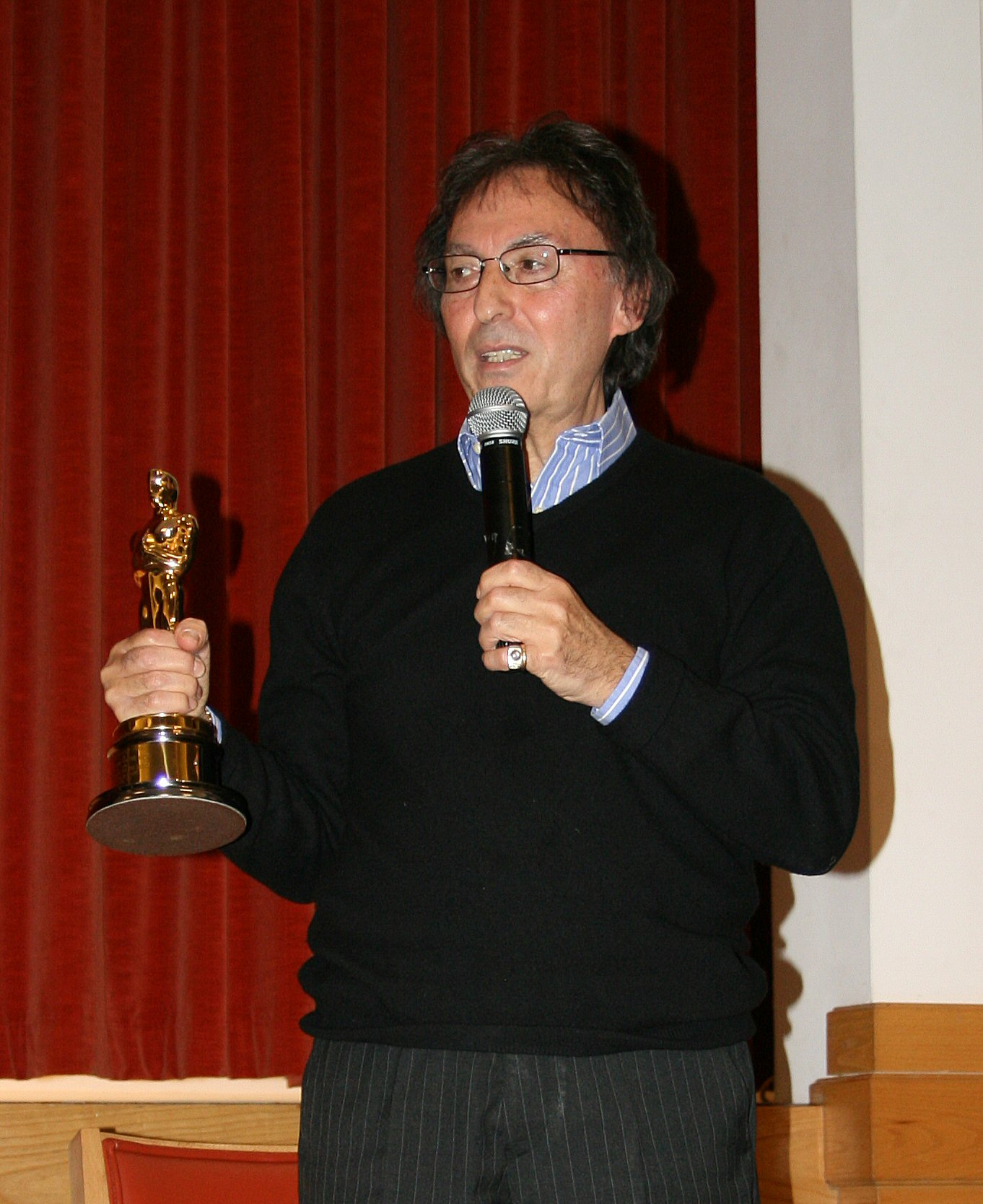
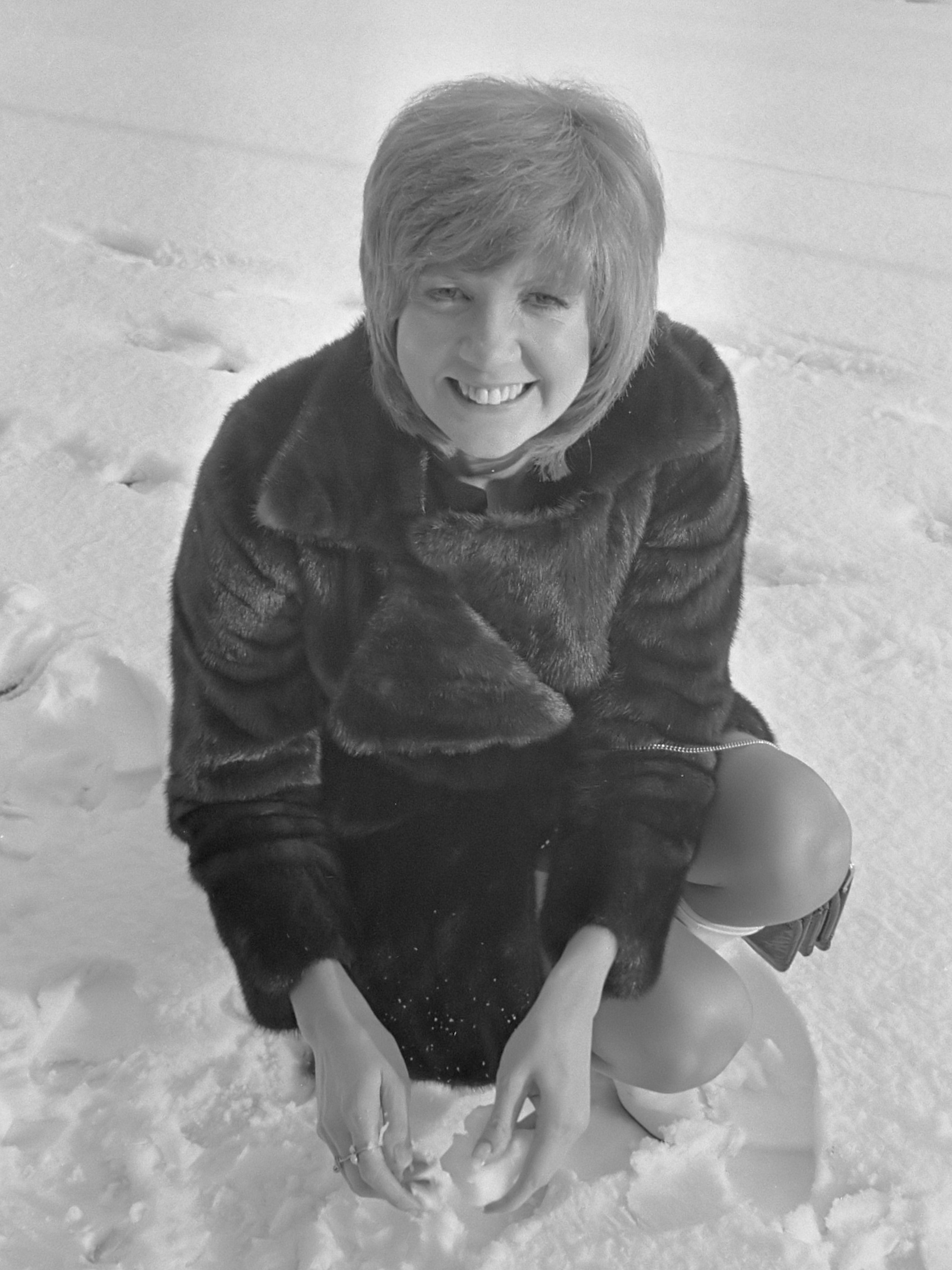
The Smiths covered Guy Woolfenden (not pictured) and Don Black's (top) song "Work Is a Four Letter Word" - originally recorded by Cilla Black (bottom) - in 1987.

Name of song, writer(s), original release, and year of release
Song	Writer(s)	Original release	Year	Ref(s)
"Accept Yourself" #	Johnny Marr; Morrissey	Hatful of Hollow (B-side to "This Charming Man")	1984	
"Ask" ‡	Johnny Marr; Morrissey	The World Won't Listen (Non-album single)	1986	
"Asleep" #	Johnny Marr; Morrissey	The World Won't Listen (B-side to "The Boy with the Thorn in His Side")	1985	
"Back to the Old House" #	Johnny Marr; Morrissey	Hatful of Hollow (B-side to "What Difference Does It Make?")	1984	
"Barbarism Begins at Home" ‡	Johnny Marr; Morrissey	Meat Is Murder	1985	
"Bigmouth Strikes Again" ‡	Johnny Marr; Morrissey	The Queen Is Dead	1986	
"The Boy with the Thorn in His Side" ‡	Johnny Marr; Morrissey	The Queen Is Dead	1986	
"Cemetry Gates"	Johnny Marr; Morrissey	The Queen Is Dead	1986	
"Death at One's Elbow"	Johnny Marr; Morrissey	Strangeways, Here We Come	1987	
"Death of a Disco Dancer"	Johnny Marr; Morrissey	Strangeways, Here We Come	1987	
"The Draize Train" #	Johnny Marr	Non-album single (B-side to "Panic" and "Some Girls Are Bigger Than Others")	1986	
"Frankly, Mr. Shankly"	Johnny Marr; Morrissey	The Queen Is Dead	1986	
"Girl Afraid" #	Johnny Marr; Morrissey	Hatful of Hollow (B-side to "Heaven Knows I'm Miserable Now")	1984	
"Girlfriend in a Coma" ‡	Johnny Marr; Morrissey	Strangeways, Here We Come	1987	
"Golden Lights" #	Twinkle †	Louder Than Bombs (B-side to "Ask")	1987	
"Half a Person" #	Johnny Marr; Morrissey	The World Won't Listen (B-side to "Shoplifters of the World Unite")	1987	
"Hand in Glove" ‡	Johnny Marr; Morrissey	The Smiths	1983	
"The Hand That Rocks the Cradle"	Johnny Marr; Morrissey	The Smiths	1984	
"Handsome Devil" #	Johnny Marr; Morrissey	Hatful of Hollow (B-side to "Hand in Glove")	1984	
"The Headmaster Ritual"	Johnny Marr; Morrissey	Meat Is Murder	1985	
"Heaven Knows I'm Miserable Now" ‡	Johnny Marr; Morrissey	Hatful of Hollow (Non-album single)	1984	
"His Latest Flame" (Note: Performed live as a medley with "Rusholme Ruffians") (live)	Doc Pomus; Mort Shuman †	Rank	1988	
"How Soon Is Now?" # ‡	Johnny Marr; Morrissey	Hatful of Hollow (B-side to "William, It Was Really Nothing")	1984	
"I Don't Owe You Anything"	Johnny Marr; Morrissey	The Smiths	1984	
"I Keep Mine Hidden" #	Johnny Marr; Morrissey	Non-album single (B-side to "Girlfriend in a Coma")	1987	
"I Know It's Over"	Johnny Marr; Morrissey	The Queen Is Dead	1986	
"I Started Something I Couldn't Finish" ‡	Johnny Marr; Morrissey	Strangeways, Here We Come	1987	
"I Want the One I Can't Have"	Johnny Marr; Morrissey	Meat Is Murder	1985	
"I Won't Share You"	Johnny Marr; Morrissey	Strangeways, Here We Come	1987	
"Is It Really So Strange?" #	Johnny Marr; Morrissey	Louder Than Bombs (B-side to "Sheila Take a Bow")	1987	
"Jeane" #	Johnny Marr; Morrissey	Non-album single (B-side to "This Charming Man")	1983	
"Last Night I Dreamt That Somebody Loved Me" ‡	Johnny Marr; Morrissey	Strangeways, Here We Come	1987	
"London" #	Johnny Marr; Morrissey	The World Won't Listen (B-side to "Shoplifters of the World Unite")	1987	
"Meat Is Murder"	Johnny Marr; Morrissey	Meat Is Murder	1985	
"Miserable Lie"	Johnny Marr; Morrissey	The Smiths	1984	
"Money Changes Everything" #	Johnny Marr	The World Won't Listen (B-side to "Bigmouth Strikes Again")	1986	
"Never Had No One Ever"	Johnny Marr; Morrissey	The Queen Is Dead	1986	
"Nowhere Fast"	Johnny Marr; Morrissey	Meat Is Murder	1985	
"Oscillate Wildly" #	Johnny Marr	The World Won't Listen (B-side to "How Soon Is Now?")	1985	
"Paint a Vulgar Picture"	Johnny Marr; Morrissey	Strangeways, Here We Come	1987	
"Panic" ‡	Johnny Marr; Morrissey	The World Won't Listen (Non-album single)	1986	
"Please, Please, Please, Let Me Get What I Want" #	Johnny Marr; Morrissey	Hatful of Hollow (B-side to "William, It Was Really Nothing")	1984	
"Pretty Girls Make Graves"	Johnny Marr; Morrissey	The Smiths	1984	
"The Queen Is Dead" ‡	Johnny Marr; Morrissey	The Queen Is Dead	1986	
"Reel Around the Fountain"	Johnny Marr; Morrissey	The Smiths	1984	
"Rubber Ring" #	Johnny Marr; Morrissey	The World Won't Listen (B-side to "The Boy with the Thorn in His Side")	1985	
"A Rush and a Push and the Land Is Ours"	Johnny Marr; Morrissey	Strangeways, Here We Come	1987	
"Rusholme Ruffians"	Johnny Marr; Morrissey	Meat Is Murder	1985	
"Shakespeare's Sister" ‡	Johnny Marr; Morrissey	The World Won't Listen (Non-album single)	1985	
"Sheila Take a Bow" ‡	Johnny Marr; Morrissey	Louder Than Bombs (Non-album single)	1987	
"Shoplifters of the World Unite" ‡	Johnny Marr; Morrissey	The World Won't Listen (Non-album single)	1986	
"Some Girls Are Bigger Than Others" ‡	Johnny Marr; Morrissey	The Queen Is Dead	1986	
"Still Ill"	Johnny Marr; Morrissey	The Smiths	1984	
"Stop Me If You Think You've Heard This One Before" ‡	Johnny Marr; Morrissey	Strangeways, Here We Come	1987	
"Stretch Out and Wait" #	Johnny Marr; Morrissey	The World Won't Listen (B-side to "Shakespeare's Sister")	1985	
"Suffer Little Children"	Johnny Marr; Morrissey	The Smiths	1984	
"Sweet and Tender Hooligan" #	Johnny Marr; Morrissey	Louder Than Bombs (B-side to "Sheila Take a Bow")	1987	
"That Joke Isn't Funny Anymore" ‡	Johnny Marr; Morrissey	Meat Is Murder	1985	
"There Is a Light That Never Goes Out" ‡	Johnny Marr; Morrissey	The Queen Is Dead	1986	
"These Things Take Time" #	Johnny Marr; Morrissey	Hatful of Hollow (B-side to "What Difference Does It Make?")	1984	
"This Charming Man" ‡	Johnny Marr; Morrissey	Hatful of Hollow (Non-album single)	1983	
"This Night Has Opened My Eyes"	Johnny Marr; Morrissey	Hatful of Hollow	1984	
"Unhappy Birthday"	Johnny Marr; Morrissey	Strangeways, Here We Come	1987	
"Unloveable" #	Johnny Marr; Morrissey	The World Won't Listen (B-side to "Bigmouth Strikes Again")	1987	
"Vicar in a Tutu"	Johnny Marr; Morrissey	The Queen Is Dead	1986	
"Well I Wonder" #	Johnny Marr; Morrissey	Meat Is Murder (B-side to "How Soon Is Now?")	1985	
"What Difference Does It Make?" ‡	Johnny Marr; Morrissey	The Smiths	1984	
"What She Said"	Johnny Marr; Morrissey	Meat Is Murder	1985	
"What's the World" (live) #	James †	Non-album single (B-side to "I Started Something I Couldn't Finish")	1987	
"William, It Was Really Nothing" ‡	Johnny Marr; Morrissey	Hatful of Hollow (Non-album single)	1984	
"Wonderful Woman" #	Johnny Marr; Morrissey	Non-album single (B-side to "This Charming Man")	1983	
"Work is a Four Letter Word" #	Guy Woolfenden; Don Black †	Non-album single (B-side to "Girlfriend in a Coma")	1987	
"You Just Haven't Earned It Yet, Baby"	Johnny Marr; Morrissey	The World Won't Listen	1987	
"You've Got Everything Now"	Johnny Marr; Morrissey	The Smiths	1984	
