= Complete (The Smiths album) =

Box set by the Smiths
- Released: 26 September 2011
- Recorded: 1983–1987
- Genres: Alternative rock, indie pop
- Length: 404:38
- Label: Rhino Entertainment
- Producer: Various

The Smiths chronology
The Smiths Singles Box (2008)	Complete (2011)

Professional ratings
Aggregate scores
Source	Rating
Metacritic	89/100
Review scores
Source	Rating
AllMusic	5/5 stars
Filter	96%
Pitchfork	8.1/10
The Independent	4/5 stars
Mojo	80/100
PopMatters	8/10
Spectrum Culture	5/5 stars

Complete is a box set compilation by the English rock band the Smiths, released by Rhino Records on 26 September 2011. The standard CD and LP versions contain the band's four studio albums The Smiths (with "This Charming Man" added as per the original US release), Meat Is Murder, The Queen Is Dead and Strangeways, Here We Come, their only live album Rank and the three compilation albums released while the band were still active–Hatful of Hollow, The World Won't Listen and Louder Than Bombs–on eight CDs or eight LPs. A deluxe version contains those eight albums on both CD and LP formats, as well as 25 seven-inch vinyl singles and a DVD.

== Content ==
The box's liner notes state that "each album has been taken back to original tape sources and remastered by master-engineer Frank Arkwright, assisted by Johnny Marr at the Metropolis Studios in London". The discs in the CD version are presented in miniature vinyl replica sleeves, including the restored The World Won't Listen artwork. The project was managed by Gary Lancaster, who also worked on Total: From Joy Division to New Order and several other Warner Music Group releases.

Of the reissued albums, which were also released separately on both CD and vinyl, Marr said, "I'm very happy that the remastered versions of the Smiths albums are finally coming out. I wanted to get them sounding right and remove any processing so that they now sound as they did when they were originally made. I'm pleased with the results."

== Cover art ==
The cover art features an image of four unknown women at a fairground, taken by German photographer Jürgen Vollmer in the early 1960s. The band first used the photograph on the back cover of The World Won't Listen, singer Morrissey feeling the girls looked like the band members themselves.

== Song omissions ==
Despite its name, this remastered compilation is not a truly complete source of Smiths recordings, as several officially released songs are missing on both the standard CDs and LPs. These include:

- The live version of "Handsome Devil"
- The studio versions of "Accept Yourself" and "Wonderful Woman"
- The "London" version of "This Charming Man"
- The song "Jeane" from the "This Charming Man" single
- The group's three Sandie Shaw collaborations ("Hand in Glove", "I Don't Owe You Anything", and "Jeane")
- The live tracks from the "That Joke Isn't Funny Anymore" single
- The single mixes of "The Boy with the Thorn in His Side" and "Ask"
- The studio versions of "The Draize Train", "Work Is a Four-Letter Word" and "I Keep Mine Hidden"
- The live cover of James' "What's the World"
- The 1984 John Peel sessions from the "Last Night I Dreamt That Somebody Loved Me" single
- The live version of "Some Girls Are Bigger Than Others"
- The early Troy Tate-produced cello version of "Pretty Girls Make Graves"

The "deluxe version" of the box set contains several of these tracks as part of the 7-inch vinyl set, but is still missing several studio and live tracks.

== Track listing ==
All songs written by Morrissey and Johnny Marr, except:

- "Take Me Back to Dear Old Blighty" (A.J. Mills, Fred Godfrey, Bennett Scott)
- "His Latest Flame" (Doc Pomus, Mort Shuman)
- "The Draize Train", "Money Changes Everything" and "Oscillate Wildly" (Johnny Marr)
- "Golden Lights" (Twinkle)
- "Work Is a Four-Letter Word" (Guy Woolfenden, Don Black)

CD1/LP1 – The Smiths track listing
No.	Title	Length
1.	"Reel Around the Fountain"	5:58
2.	"You've Got Everything Now"	3:59
3.	"Miserable Lie"	4:29
4.	"Pretty Girls Make Graves"	3:24
5.	"The Hand That Rocks the Cradle"	4:38
6.	"This Charming Man"	2:52
7.	"Still Ill"	3:23
8.	"Hand in Glove"	3:25
9.	"What Difference Does It Make?"	3:51
10.	"I Don't Owe You Anything"	4:05
11.	"Suffer Little Children"	5:28

CD2/LP2 – Meat Is Murder track listing
No.	Title	Length
1.	"The Headmaster Ritual"	4:52
2.	"Rusholme Ruffians"	4:20
3.	"I Want the One I Can't Have"	3:14
4.	"What She Said"	2:42
5.	"That Joke Isn't Funny Anymore"	4:59
6.	"Nowhere Fast"	2:37
7.	"Well I Wonder"	4:00
8.	"Barbarism Begins at Home"	6:57
9.	"Meat Is Murder"	6:06

CD3/LP3 – The Queen Is Dead track listing
No.	Title	Length
1.	"The Queen Is Dead"	6:24
2.	"Frankly, Mr. Shankly"	2:17
3.	"I Know It's Over"	5:48
4.	"Never Had No One Ever"	3:36
5.	"Cemetry Gates"	2:39
6.	"Bigmouth Strikes Again"	3:12
7.	"The Boy with the Thorn in His Side"	3:15
8.	"Vicar in a Tutu"	2:21
9.	"There Is a Light That Never Goes Out"	4:02
10.	"Some Girls Are Bigger Than Others"	3:14

CD4/LP4 – Strangeways, Here We Come track listing
No.	Title	Length
1.	"A Rush and a Push and the Land Is Ours"	3:00
2.	"I Started Something I Couldn't Finish"	3:47
3.	"Death of a Disco Dancer"	5:26
4.	"Girlfriend in a Coma"	2:03
5.	"Stop Me If You Think You've Heard This One Before"	3:32
6.	"Last Night I Dreamt That Somebody Loved Me"	5:03
7.	"Unhappy Birthday"	2:46
8.	"Paint a Vulgar Picture"	5:35
9.	"Death at One's Elbow"	2:01
10.	"I Won't Share You"	2:48

CD5/LP5 – Rank track listing (all tracks live at National Ballroom, Kilburn, London, 23 October 1986)
No.	Title	Length
1.	"The Queen Is Dead"	4:11
2.	"Panic"	3:07
3.	"Vicar in a Tutu"	2:40
4.	"Ask"	3:12
5.	"His Latest Flame / Rusholme Ruffians (Medley)"	3:55
6.	"The Boy with the Thorn in His Side"	3:47
7.	"Rubber Ring / What She Said (Medley)"	3:41
8.	"Is It Really So Strange?"	3:45
9.	"Cemetry Gates"	2:50
10.	"London"	2:38
11.	"I Know It's Over"	7:49
12.	"The Draize Train"	4:23
13.	"Still Ill"	4:09
14.	"Bigmouth Strikes Again"	5:51

CD6/LP6 – Hatful of Hollow track listing
No.	Title	Length
1.	"William, It Was Really Nothing"	2:09
2.	"What Difference Does It Make? (John Peel session, 18 May 1983)"	3:11
3.	"These Things Take Time (David Jensen session, 26 June 1983)"	2:32
4.	"This Charming Man (John Peel session, 14 September 1983)"	2:42
5.	"How Soon Is Now?"	6:44
6.	"Handsome Devil (John Peel session, 18 May 1983)"	2:47
7.	"Hand in Glove (single version)"	3:13
8.	"Still Ill (John Peel session, 14 September 1983)"	3:32
9.	"Heaven Knows I'm Miserable Now"	3:33
10.	"This Night Has Opened My Eyes (John Peel session, 14 September 1983)"	3:39
11.	"You've Got Everything Now (David Jensen session, 26 June 1983)"	4:18
12.	"Accept Yourself (David Jensen session, 25 August 1983)"	4:01
13.	"Girl Afraid"	2:48
14.	"Back to the Old House (John Peel session, 14 September 1983)"	3:02
15.	"Reel Around the Fountain (John Peel session, 18 May 1983)"	5:51
16.	"Please, Please, Please, Let Me Get What I Want"	1:50

CD7/LP7 – The World Won't Listen track listing
No.	Title	Length
1.	"Panic"	2:21
2.	"Ask"	3:15
3.	"London"	2:07
4.	"Bigmouth Strikes Again"	3:13
5.	"Shakespeare's Sister"	2:08
6.	"There Is a Light That Never Goes Out"	4:05
7.	"Shoplifters of the World Unite"	2:58
8.	"The Boy with the Thorn in His Side" (Album version; original release included the single version)	3:16
9.	"Money Changes Everything"	4:43
10.	"Asleep"	4:10
11.	"Unloveable"	3:56
12.	"Half a Person"	3:36
13.	"Stretch Out and Wait (alternate vocal)"	2:45
14.	"That Joke Isn't Funny Anymore (single version)"	3:49
15.	"Oscillate Wildly"	3:26
16.	"You Just Haven't Earned It Yet, Baby (UK mix)"	3:32
17.	"Rubber Ring"	3:48

CD8/LP8 – Louder Than Bombs track listing
No.	Title	Length
1.	"Is It Really So Strange? (John Peel session, 12/2/86)"	3:04
2.	"Sheila Take a Bow"	2:41
3.	"Shoplifters of the World Unite"	2:57
4.	"Sweet and Tender Hooligan (John Peel session, 12/2/86)"	3:35
5.	"Half a Person"	3:36
6.	"London"	2:07
7.	"Panic"	2:20
8.	"Girl Afraid"	2:48
9.	"Shakespeare's Sister"	2:09
10.	"William, It Was Really Nothing"	2:11
11.	"You Just Haven't Earned It Yet, Baby" (Original UK mix; original release included an alternate US mix)	3:34
12.	"Heaven Knows I'm Miserable Now"	3:34
13.	"Ask"	3:18
14.	"Golden Lights"	2:39
15.	"Oscillate Wildly"	3:27
16.	"These Things Take Time"	2:23
17.	"Rubber Ring"	3:48
18.	"Back to the Old House"	3:05
19.	"Hand in Glove (Single Version)"	3:13
20.	"Stretch Out and Wait (Original Version)"	2:38
21.	"Please, Please, Please, Let Me Get What I Want"	1:52
22.	"This Night Has Opened My Eyes (John Peel Session, 9/14/83)"	3:40
23.	"Unlovable"	3:55
24.	"Asleep"	4:11

Deluxe Edition 7" singles track listing
No.	Title	Length
1.	"Hand in Glove / Handsome Devil (Live at the Hacienda, Manchester 1983)"
2.	"Reel Around the Fountain (Troy Tate Reel) / Jeane"
3.	"This Charming Man / Jeane"
4.	"What Difference Does It Make? / Back to the Old House"
5.	"Heaven Knows I'm Miserable Now / Suffer Little Children"
6.	"William, It Was Really Nothing / Please Please Please Let Me Get What I Want"
7.	"How Soon Is Now? / Well I Wonder"
8.	"Shakespeare's Sister / What She Said"
9.	"Barbarism Begins at Home / Shakespeare's Sister"
10.	"The Headmaster Ritual / Oscillate Wildly"
11.	"That Joke Isn't Funny Anymore / Meat Is Murder (Live)"
12.	"The Boy with the Thorn in His Side / Asleep"
13.	"Bigmouth Strikes Again / Money Changes Everything"
14.	"Panic / Vicar in a Tutu"
15.	"Ask / Cemetry Gates"
16.	"Shoplifters of the World Unite / Half a Person"
17.	"Sheila Take a Bow / Is It Really So Strange?"
18.	"Girlfriend in a Coma / Work Is a Four-Letter Word"
19.	"I Started Something I Couldn't Finish / Pretty Girls Make Graves (Troy Tate Version)"
20.	"Last Night I Dreamt That Somebody Loved Me / Rusholme Ruffians (John Peel Version)"
21.	"Sweet and Tender Hooligan / I Keep Mine Hidden" (Previously unreleased version)
22.	"There Is a Light That Never Goes Out / Half a Person"
23.	"Some Girls Are Bigger Than Others / The Draize Train"
24.	"Stop Me If You Think You've Heard This One Before / Girlfriend in a Coma"
25.	"William, It Was Really Nothing / How Soon Is Now?"

Deluxe Edition DVD track listing
No.	Title	Length
1.	"This Charming Man"
2.	"What Difference Does It Make?"
3.	"Panic"
4.	"Heaven Knows I'm Miserable Now"
5.	"Ask"
6.	"The Boy with the Thorn in His Side"
7.	"How Soon Is Now?"
8.	"Shoplifters of the World Unite"
9.	"Girlfriend in a Coma"
10.	"Sheila Take a Bow"
11.	"Stop Me If You Think You've Heard This One Before"

== Charts ==
Chart performance for Complete
Chart (2011)	Peak position
Belgian Albums (Ultratop Flanders)	81
German Albums (Offizielle Top 100)	91
Irish Albums (IRMA)	75
Scottish Albums (Official Charts)	64
Spanish Albums (Promusicae)	79
UK Albums (Official Charts)	63
