= The Very Best of The Smiths =

Greatest hits album by the Smiths
- Released: 4 June 2001
- Recorded: 1983–1987
- Genre: Alternative rock; indie pop
- Length: 78:34
- Label: WEA
- Producer: John Porter; The Smiths; Roger Pusey; Dale "Buffin" Griffin; Stephen Street

The Smiths chronology
Singles (1995)	The Very Best of The Smiths (2001)	The Sound of The Smiths (2008)

Professional ratings
Review scores
Source	Rating
AllMusic	3/5 stars
Blender	5/5 stars
The Encyclopedia of Popular Music	4/5 stars

The Very Best of The Smiths is a compilation album of songs by the English rock band the Smiths. It was released in June 2001 by WEA in Europe, without consent or input from the band. It reached number 30 on the UK Albums Chart. The album was not released in the United States.

== Background ==
After Singles (1995), the previous Smiths compilation album that WEA (now the Warner Music Group) had issued, went out of print in Europe, Australia and Taiwan, the record company decided to revamp the package slightly and release it under the name The Very Best of the Smiths. WEA rearranged the running order, added five tracks and enticed the record buyers with the incentive of digital remastering.

The album was widely criticised by the British music press, who, after stopping to praise the actual music, went on to condemn what they saw as a money-grabbing exercise. They were quickly joined by singer Morrissey and guitarist Johnny Marr, who distanced themselves from the album, stating they had had no input whatsoever and that it should be ignored by fans. Both ridiculed the cover design and Marr additionally denounced the sound quality.

In the tradition of other Smiths compilations which largely overlapped except for a few songs, this album does contain two versions that had not been previously available on any of the Smiths' other albums: the single mix of "Ask" and the 7-inch edit of "Last Night I Dreamt That Somebody Loved Me". The Singles compilation had used the album versions of these songs.

=== Cover ===
The sleeve for The Very Best of The Smiths features Charles Hawtrey of Carry On fame, one of Morrissey's favourite actors, for whom he wrote an obituary in the NME. The band members had no say in the cover, which was described as "an adman's approximation of a Smiths cover" by Mojo magazine.

== Track listing ==
All songs written by Morrissey/Marr.

No.	Title	Original release	Length
1.	"Panic"	Louder Than Bombs; The World Won't Listen	2:20
2.	"The Boy with the Thorn in His Side" (single version)	The World Won't Listen	3:17
3.	"Heaven Knows I'm Miserable Now"	Hatful of Hollow; Louder Than Bombs; The World Won't Listen	3:35
4.	"Ask" (single version)	Louder Than Bombs	3:09
5.	"Bigmouth Strikes Again"	The Queen Is Dead	3:13
6.	"How Soon Is Now?" (album version)	Hatful of Hollow; Meat Is Murder (some editions)	6:45
7.	"This Charming Man"	The Smiths	2:42
8.	"What Difference Does It Make?"	The Smiths	3:51
9.	"William, It Was Really Nothing"	Hatful of Hollow; The World Won't Listen	2:12
10.	"Some Girls Are Bigger Than Others"	The Queen Is Dead	3:17
11.	"Girlfriend in a Coma"	Strangeways, Here We Come	2:02
12.	"Hand in Glove" (album version)	The Smiths	3:24
13.	"There Is a Light That Never Goes Out"	The Queen Is Dead	4:04
14.	"Please, Please, Please, Let Me Get What I Want"	Hatful of Hollow; Louder Than Bombs; The World Won't Listen	1:53
15.	"That Joke Isn't Funny Anymore" (album version)	Meat Is Murder	4:59
16.	"I Know It's Over"	The Queen Is Dead	5:49
17.	"Sheila Take a Bow"	Louder Than Bombs; The World Won't Listen	2:41
18.	"I Started Something I Couldn't Finish"	Strangeways, Here We Come	3:47
19.	"Still Ill"	The Smiths	3:22
20.	"Shakespeare's Sister"	Louder Than Bombs; The World Won't Listen	2:09
21.	"Shoplifters of the World Unite"	Louder Than Bombs; The World Won't Listen	2:58
22.	"Last Night I Dreamt That Somebody Loved Me" (single version)	Non-album single	3:10
23.	"Stop Me If You Think You've Heard This One Before"	Strangeways, Here We Come	3:33

== Personnel ==
The Smiths

- Morrissey – vocals
- Johnny Marr – guitars, keyboard instruments, harmonica, mandolins, synthesized saxophone, string and flute arrangements
- Andy Rourke – bass guitar, cello on "Shakespeare's Sister"
- Mike Joyce – drums

Additional musicians

- Craig Gannon – rhythm guitar on "Panic" and "Ask"
- Kirsty MacColl – backing vocals on "Ask"
- John Porter – slide guitar on "Sheila Take a Bow"
- Stephen Street – drum machine on "I Started Something I Couldn't Finish" and synthesized string arrangements on "Girlfriend in a Coma"

The following credits were adapted from the CD liner notes:

Technical

- John Porter – producer (1, 3–4, 6–9, 12, 14, 19)
- Morrissey – producer (2, 5, 10, 11, 13, 16–18, 22–23)
- Johnny Marr – producer (2, 5, 10, 11, 13, 16–18, 21–23)
- Stephen Street – producer (11, 17–18, 22–23)
- The Smiths – producers (15, 20)
- Steve Lillywhite – mixing (4)
- Bill Inglot – remastering
- Dan Hersch – remastering
- Aquarius Library – front cover photograph
- Paul Lester – liner notes

== Charts ==
2001 weekly chart performance for The Very Best of The Smiths
Chart (2001)	Peak position
Irish Albums Chart	34
UK Albums Chart	30

2006 weekly chart performance for The Very Best of The Smiths
Chart (2006)	Peak position
Spanish Albums (Promusicae)	81

== Certifications ==
Certifications for The Very Best of The Smiths
Region	Certification	Certified units/sales
United Kingdom (BPI)	Platinum	300,000^{^}
^{^} Shipments figures based on certification alone.
