= The Sound of The Smiths =

Compilation album by the Smiths
- Released: 10 November 2008
- Genre: Indie pop
- Length: 74:04
- Label: Rhino Records UK
- Producers: John Porter; The Smiths; Roger Pusey; Dale "Buffin" Griffin; Stephen Street
- Compiler: Rick Conrad

The Smiths chronology
The Very Best of The Smiths (2001)	The Sound of The Smiths (2008)	The Smiths Singles Box (2008)

Alternative cover
- Deluxe edition cover

Professional ratings
Review scores
Source	Rating
AllMusic	5/5 stars
Blender	4.5/5 stars
The Guardian	4/5 stars
Hot Press	5/5 stars
Pitchfork	7.5/10
Rolling Stone	5/5 stars

The Sound of The Smiths is a compilation album by the English rock band the Smiths, released on 10 November 2008 by Rhino Records UK. It is available as both single and double disc editions. Morrissey is credited with having coined the compilation's title, while Johnny Marr was involved in the project's mastering. Early promotional material for the album originally saw it titled Hang the DJ: The Very Best of the Smiths, but this was changed for the final release.

The album charted No. 21 on the UK Albums Chart and No. 98 on the Billboard 200. The pictures on the covers of the original and deluxe editions were taken by Tom Sheehan. It is their only album featuring the band members on the artwork.

== Track listing ==
All tracks are written by Morrissey/Marr.

CD 1
No.	Title	Source	Length
1.	"Hand in Glove" (Single version)	Single A-side	3:17
2.	"This Charming Man"	Single A-side	2:44
3.	"What Difference Does It Make?" (Peel Session 18/5/83)	Hatful of Hollow	3:14
4.	"Still Ill"	The Smiths	3:22
5.	"Heaven Knows I'm Miserable Now"	Single A-side	3:35
6.	"William, It Was Really Nothing"	Single A-side	2:13
7.	"How Soon Is Now?" (12" Version)	B-side of "William, It Was Really Nothing" 12"	6:47
8.	"Nowhere Fast"	Meat Is Murder	2:38
9.	"Shakespeare's Sister"	Single A-side	2:09
10.	"Barbarism Begins at Home" (7" edit Version)	Meat Is Murder/Single A-side	3:51
11.	"That Joke Isn't Funny Anymore" (Single Edit)	Meat Is Murder/Single A-side	3:53
12.	"The Headmaster Ritual"	Meat Is Murder	4:56
13.	"The Boy with the Thorn in His Side"	The Queen Is Dead	3:18
14.	"Bigmouth Strikes Again"	Single A-side/The Queen Is Dead	3:15
15.	"There Is a Light That Never Goes Out"	The Queen Is Dead	4:05
16.	"Panic"	Single A-side	2:20
17.	"Ask" (Album Version)	Louder Than Bombs	3:17
18.	"You Just Haven't Earned It Yet, Baby"	The World Won't Listen	3:33
19.	"Shoplifters of the World Unite"	Single A-side	2:58
20.	"Sheila Take a Bow"	Single A-side/ Louder Than Bombs	2:42
21.	"Girlfriend in a Coma"	Single A-side/Strangeways, Here We Come	2:03
22.	"I Started Something I Couldn't Finish"	Single A-side/ Strangeways, Here We Come	3:49
23.	"Last Night I Dreamt That Somebody Loved Me" (Single Edit)	Strangeways, Here We Come/Single A-side	3:11

- The iTunes release of the deluxe edition includes the bonus tracks "Rubber Ring" (as track 14) and "The Draize Train" (as track 18) on CD 1.
- Additionally, the iTunes edition of the single-disc version includes "What She Said" (as track 10) as a bonus track plus "Hand in Glove" (Live at Brixton Ace 29/6/83) (as track 25).
- "You Just Haven't Earned It Yet, Baby" is a slightly slower version than previously issued. According to an interview posted on Johnny Marr's homepage with mastering engineer Frank Arkwright, "[W]e removed the varispeed from the original release which I thought was too fast ..."

All tracks are written by Morrissey/Marr, except "What's the World?," by James, and "Oscillate Wildly", by Johnny Marr.

CD 2: deluxe edition
No.	Title	Source	Length
1.	"Jeane"	B-side of "This Charming Man"	3:03
2.	"Handsome Devil" (Live at The Haçienda, Manchester, 4/2/83)	B-side of "Hand in Glove"	2:55
3.	"This Charming Man" (New York Vocal)	B-side of "This Charming Man" 12"	5:35
4.	"Wonderful Woman"	B-side of "This Charming Man"	3:11
5.	"Back to the Old House"	B-side of "What Difference Does it Make?"	3:04
6.	"These Things Take Time"	B-side of "What Difference Does It Make?"	2:22
7.	"Girl Afraid"	B-side of "Heaven Knows I'm Miserable Now"	2:47
8.	"Please, Please, Please, Let Me Get What I Want"	B-side of "William, It Was Really Nothing"	1:50
9.	"Stretch Out and Wait" (Alternate Vocal Version)	The World Won't Listen	2:44
10.	"Oscillate Wildly"	B-side of "How Soon Is Now?" 12"	3:29
11.	"Meat Is Murder" (Live at Oxford Apollo 18/3/85)	B-side of "That Joke Isn't Funny Anymore"	5:37
12.	"Asleep"	B-side of "The Boy With the Thorn in His Side"	4:10
13.	"Money Changes Everything"	B-side of "Bigmouth Strikes Again"	4:39
14.	"The Queen Is Dead"	The Queen Is Dead	6:23
15.	"Vicar in a Tutu"	B-side of "Panic" /The Queen Is Dead	2:22
16.	"Cemetry Gates"	B-side of "Ask" / The Queen Is Dead	2:41
17.	"Half a Person"	B-side of "Shoplifters of the World Unite"	3:38
18.	"Sweet and Tender Hooligan" (Peel Session 2/12/86)	Louder Than Bombs	3:34
19.	"Pretty Girls Make Graves" (Troy Tate Demo)	B-side of "I Started Something I Couldn't Finish"	3:32
20.	"Stop Me If You Think You've Heard This One Before"	Strangeways, Here We Come	3:31
21.	"What's the World?" (Live at the Barrowlands, Glasgow 25/9/85)	B-side of "I Started Something I Couldn't Finish"	2:06
22.	"London" (Live at National Ballroom, Kilburn)	Rank	2:40

== Charts ==
=== Weekly charts ===
Weekly chart performance for The Sound of The Smiths
Chart (2008–2010)	Peak position
Australian Albums (ARIA)	114
Belgian Albums (Ultratop Flanders)	68
Italian Albums (FIMI)	18
Irish Albums (IRMA)	28
Scottish Albums (Official Charts)	23
Portuguese Albums (AFP)	50
UK Albums (Official Charts)	21
US Billboard 200	98

=== Year-end charts ===
Year-end chart performance for The Sound of The Smiths
Chart	Year	Position
UK Albums (OCC)	2023	71
UK Albums (OCC)	2024	52
UK Albums (OCC)	2025	64

== Certifications ==
Certifications for The Sound of The Smiths
Region	Certification	Certified units/sales
Italy (FIMI)	Gold	35,000^{*}
United Kingdom (BPI)	3× Platinum	900,000^{‡}
^{*} Sales figures based on certification alone.^{‡} Sales+streaming figures based on certification alone.
