= Singles (The Smiths album) =

Greatest hits album by the Smiths
- Released: 20 February 1995
- Recorded: 1983–1987
- Genre: Alternative rock; indie pop
- Length: 62:32
- Label: Warner Music Group
- Producer: John Porter; The Smiths; Roger Pusey; Dale "Buffin" Griffin; Stephen Street

The Smiths chronology
...Best II (1992)	Singles (1995)	The Very Best of The Smiths (2001)

Singles from Singles
- 1. "Ask" Released: 6 February 1995

Singles is the seventh compilation album by the English rock band the Smiths, pitched as a compilation of previously issued singles. It was released in February 1995 by the new owner of their back catalogue, WEA (Sire Records in the United States). Its highest British chart position was No. 5; it did not chart in the United States. Blender magazine listed the album among the "500 CDs You Must Own" on their website.

== Background ==
Professional ratings
Review scores
Source	Rating
AllMusic	5/5 stars
The Encyclopedia of Popular Music	4/5 stars

WEA (now the Warner Music Group) acquired the entire Smiths back catalogue in early 1992. After re-releasing all of The Smiths' eight original albums (the four studio albums, the Rank live album and the three compilation albums issued while the band were still active) and releasing a newly assembled two-volume best of compilation album (Best I and Best II) in 1992, they decided to celebrate The Smiths' reputation as a "singles band" by issuing a collection of the band's singles in 1995. Only the singles released in the UK were included.

Despite the album's title, the Singles versions of "Hand in Glove", "The Boy with the Thorn in His Side" and "Ask" were not the original single mixes. Similarly, "What Difference Does It Make?", "How Soon Is Now?", "That Joke Isn't Funny Anymore" and "Last Night I Dreamt That Somebody Loved Me" were the full-length album versions, that are on the original 12" singles, as opposed to the original single edits.

=== Cover ===
The cover features previously unused artwork designed by Morrissey, featuring singer and actress Diana Dors in a still from the 1956 film Yield to the Night.

== Spin-off singles ==
WEA decided to promote the album in the UK by re-releasing the "Ask" single with its two original B-sides, "Cemetry Gates" and "Golden Lights". The single charted at No. 62. In the United States, Sire decided to release "Sweet and Tender Hooligan", a single of rarities, to promote the album, with a newly designed sleeve by Morrissey. It failed to chart.

== Track listing ==
All tracks are written by Morrissey/Marr.

Singles track listing
No.	Title	Original release	Length
1.	"Hand in Glove" (album version)	The Smiths (1984)	3:25
2.	"This Charming Man"	The Smiths	2:41
3.	"What Difference Does It Make?" (album version)	The Smiths	3:51
4.	"Heaven Knows I'm Miserable Now"	Hatful of Hollow (1984)	3:35
5.	"William, It Was Really Nothing"	Hatful of Hollow	2:09
6.	"How Soon Is Now?" (12" version)	Hatful of Hollow	6:46
7.	"Shakespeare's Sister"	The World Won't Listen (1987)	2:09
8.	"That Joke Isn't Funny Anymore" (album version)	Meat Is Murder (1985)	4:59
9.	"The Boy with the Thorn in His Side" (album version)	The Queen Is Dead (1986)	3:18
10.	"Bigmouth Strikes Again"	The Queen Is Dead	3:14
11.	"Panic"	The World Won't Listen	2:20
12.	"Ask" (album version)	The World Won't Listen	3:14
13.	"Shoplifters of the World Unite"	The World Won't Listen	2:58
14.	"Sheila Take a Bow"	Louder Than Bombs (1987)	2:41
15.	"Girlfriend in a Coma"	Strangeways, Here We Come (1987)	2:02
16.	"I Started Something I Couldn't Finish"	Strangeways, Here We Come	3:46
17.	"Last Night I Dreamt That Somebody Loved Me" (album version)	Strangeways, Here We Come	5:02
18.	"There Is a Light That Never Goes Out"	The Queen Is Dead	4:02
Total length:			62:32

== Personnel ==
=== The Smiths ===
- Mike Joyce – drums
- Johnny Marr – guitars, keyboards, harmonica, synthesized saxophone, string and flute arrangements
- Morrissey – vocals
- Andy Rourke – bass guitar, cello on "Shakespeare's Sister"

=== Additional musicians ===
- Craig Gannon – rhythm guitar on "Panic" and "Ask"
- Kirsty MacColl – backing vocals on "Ask"
- John Porter – slide guitar on "Sheila Take a Bow"
- Stephen Street – drum machine on "I Started Something I Couldn't Finish" and synthesized string arrangements on "Girlfriend in a Coma"

== Charts ==
1995 weekly chart performance for Singles
Chart (1995)	Peak position
Australian Albums (ARIA)	134
UK Albums (OCC)	5

2002 weekly chart performance for Singles
Chart (2002)	Peak position
Irish Albums (IRMA)	26

== Certifications and sales ==
Certifications and sales for Singles
Region	Certification	Certified units/sales
Brazil (Pro-Música Brasil)	Gold	100,000^{*}
United Kingdom (BPI)	Platinum	300,000^{^}
United States	—	395,150
^{*} Sales figures based on certification alone.^{^} Shipments figures based on certification alone.
