= The World Won't Listen =

Compilation album by the Smiths
- Released: 23 February 1987
- Recorded: 1984–1986
- Genres: Alternative rock; indie pop
- Length: 52:24
- Label: Rough Trade
- Producers: Johnny Marr, Morrissey, John Porter, The Smiths

The Smiths chronology
| The Queen Is Dead (1986) | The World Won't Listen (1987) | Louder Than Bombs (1987) |

Professional ratings
Review scores
| Source | Rating |
|---|---|
| AllMusic | 3.5/5 stars |
| Blender | 3/5 stars |
| The Encyclopedia of Popular Music | 3/5 stars |
| Pitchfork | 7.1/10 |
| Select | 5/5 |

The World Won't Listen is a compilation album by the English rock band the Smiths, released on 23 February 1987 by Rough Trade Records. The album is the second of three compilation albums—the others being Hatful of Hollow and Louder Than Bombs—released by the Smiths while they were still an active band. It reached No. 2 on the UK Albums Chart, staying on the charts for 15 weeks. In the United States Louder Than Bombs was released in place of The World Won't Listen.

== Background ==
The album is a collection of the band's singles and select B-sides from 1985 to 1987. Additionally, the scrapped single "You Just Haven't Earned It Yet, Baby" (which was passed over for "Shoplifters of the World Unite") and the near-single "There Is a Light That Never Goes Out" (a single candidate from The Queen Is Dead that was passed over in favour of "Bigmouth Strikes Again") were included.

The title reflects Smiths singer Morrissey's belief that mainstream radio and record buyers weren't paying attention to the band. The compilation was succeeded three months later by Louder Than Bombs. Originally intended solely for US release, Rough Trade chose to also release Louder Than Bombs in the UK. It featured a similar, but extended track listing to The World Won't Listen. The World Won't Listen contains four songs that do not appear on Louder Than Bombs: the single versions of "The Boy with the Thorn in His Side"and “Bigmouth Strikes Again,” “There Is A Light That Never Goes Out,” and the single edit of "That Joke Isn't Funny Anymore". Additionally, The World Won't Listen contains different versions of two songs that would appear on Louder Than Bombs: "Stretch Out and Wait" features an alternate vocal, and "You Just Haven't Earned It Yet, Baby" appears in a slightly different and longer mix. In Australia and New Zealand, a double LP (and double cassette) second edition was released with an additional 12 tracks on the extra disc. The 12 extra tracks are mostly sourced (in order) from Louder than Bombs as well as "Panic" B-side "The Draize Train", which doesn't otherwise appear on either. The 2011 reissue replaced the single version of "The Boy With the Thorn in His Side" with the album version. Also of note is the fact that "Ask" appears on both The World Won't Listen and Louder Than Bombs in a slightly different and longer mix than its single version.

After WEA acquired the Smiths' back catalogue in 1992, all Smiths albums were re-released in the UK in 1993 at mid-price, including The World Won't Listen, which was expanded to include a cover of "Golden Lights" and the original Rough Trade cassette edition bonus track "Money Changes Everything" (the "Bigmouth Strikes Again" B-side, also later released on the deluxe edition of The Sound of The Smiths). In the US, the albums were also re-released in 1993, although The World Won't Listen was not included among them.

== Artwork and packaging ==
The CD sleeve for The World Won't Listen is based on the cassette version of the sleeve layout; the original album featured a larger picture of a 1960s fairground scene, of which this is a crop. The sleeve was designed by Morrissey, using a photo by Jürgen Vollmer from the book Rock 'N' Roll Times: The Style and Spirit of the Early Beatles and Their First Fans.

== Release ==
The album was released on 23 February 1987. It first charted on 3 March 1987, remaining in the top 100 for 15 weeks and peaking at No. 2. The World Won't Listen returned to the UK top 100 for two weeks in 1995, following its re-release by WEA. In 2011, The World Won't Listen was included in the Smiths' compilation box set Complete. This marked the first time the album was officially released in the US.

== Track listing ==
All tracks are written by Morrissey/Marr, except "Money Changes Everything" and "Oscillate Wildly", written by Johnny Marr, and "Golden Lights", written by Twinkle.

Side one
| No. | Title | Source | Length |
|---|---|---|---|
| 1. | "Panic" | Single A-side | 2:21 |
| 2. | "Ask" | Remix of single A-side | 3:15 |
| 3. | "London" | B-side of "Shoplifters of the World Unite" | 2:07 |
| 4. | "Bigmouth Strikes Again" | From The Queen Is Dead | 3:13 |
| 5. | "Shakespeare's Sister" | Single A-side | 2:08 |
| 6. | "There Is a Light That Never Goes Out" | From The Queen Is Dead | 4:05 |
| 7. | "Shoplifters of the World Unite" | Single A-side | 2:58 |
| 8. | "The Boy with the Thorn in His Side" | Single A-side version | 3:16 |
| 9. | "Money Changes Everything" | B-side of "Bigmouth Strikes Again" – only on original cassette and all CD re-releases since 1993 | 4:43 |

Side two
| No. | Title | Source | Length |
|---|---|---|---|
| 10. | "Asleep" | B-side of "The Boy with the Thorn in His Side" | 4:10 |
| 11. | "Unloveable" | B-side of "Bigmouth Strikes Again" | 3:56 |
| 12. | "Half a Person" | B-side of "Shoplifters of the World Unite" | 3:36 |
| 13. | "Stretch Out and Wait" | Alternate vocal version of B-side of "Shakespeare's Sister" | 2:45 |
| 14. | "That Joke Isn't Funny Anymore" | Single A-side edit | 3:49 |
| 15. | "Oscillate Wildly" | B-side of "How Soon Is Now?" | 3:26 |
| 16. | "You Just Haven't Earned It Yet, Baby" | UK mix of aborted single A-side | 3:31 |
| 17. | "Rubber Ring" | B-side of "The Boy with the Thorn in His Side" | 3:48 |

All CD re-releases since 1993
| No. | Title | Source | Length |
|---|---|---|---|
| 18. | "Golden Lights" | B-side of "Ask" | 2:40 |

Australia/New Zealand double LP – side three
| No. | Title | Source | Length |
|---|---|---|---|
| 18. | "Is It Really So Strange?" | B-side of "Sheila Take a Bow"; John Peel session, 2/12/86 | 3:04 |
| 19. | "Sheila Take a Bow" | Single A-side | 2:41 |
| 20. | "Sweet and Tender Hooligan" | B-side of "Sheila Take a Bow"; Peel session, 2/12/86 | 3:13 |
| 21. | "Girl Afraid" | B-side of "Heaven Knows I'm Miserable Now" | 2:48 |
| 22. | "William, It Was Really Nothing" | Single A-side | 2:11 |
| 23. | "Heaven Knows I'm Miserable Now" | Single A-side | 3:34 |

Side four
| No. | Title | Source | Length |
|---|---|---|---|
| 24. | "Golden Lights" | B-side of "Ask" | 2:39 |
| 25. | "The Draize Train" | B-side of "Panic" 12" | 3:27 |
| 26. | "Back to the Old House" | B-side of "What Difference Does It Make?" | 3:05 |
| 27. | "Hand in Glove" | Single A-side mix | 3:13 |
| 28. | "Please Please Please Let Me Get What I Want" | B-side of "William, It Was Really Nothing" | 1:52 |
| 29. | "This Night Has Opened My Eyes" | From Hatful of Hollow; Peel session, 14/9/83 | 3:40 |

== Personnel ==
- Morrissey – vocals
- Johnny Marr – guitars, keyboard instruments, slide guitar on "Panic" and "That Joke Isn't Funny Anymore", harmonica on "Ask", mandolin on "Golden Lights", marimba on "The Boy with the Thorn in His Side"
- Andy Rourke – bass guitar, cello on "Shakespeare's Sister" and "Oscillate Wildly"
- Mike Joyce – drums, tambourine on "Stretch Out and Wait"
- Craig Gannon – rhythm guitar on "Panic", "Ask", "London", "Half a Person", "You Just Haven't Earned It Yet, Baby" and "Golden Lights", lead guitar on coda of "London", mandolin on "Golden Lights"

=== Additional musicians ===
- Kirsty MacColl – backing vocals on "Ask" and "Golden Lights"
- John Porter – sound effects on "Ask", drum machine and bass on "Golden Lights"
- Stephen Street – additional drum machine programming on "London", sound effects on "Asleep", sampling on "Rubber Ring"

=== Production ===
- Johnny Marr – producer (track 7)
- Johnny Marr, Morrissey and Stephen Street – producers (track 3 and 12)
- Morrissey and Marr – producers (tracks 4, 6, 10–11, 17)
- John Porter – producer (tracks 1–2, 9, 16, 18)
- The Smiths – producers (tracks 5, 8, 13–15)

== Charts ==
Chart performance for The World Won't Listen
| Chart (1987) | Peak position |
|---|---|
| Australian Albums (Kent Music Report) | 25 |
| Dutch Albums (Album Top 100) | 15 |
| German Albums (Offizielle Top 100) | 41 |
| New Zealand Albums (RMNZ) | 16 |
| Norwegian Albums (VG-lista) | 17 |
| Swedish Albums (Sverigetopplistan) | 19 |
| UK Albums Chart | 2 |

| Chart (2025) | Peak position |
|---|---|
| Croatian International Albums (HDU) | 36 |

== Certifications ==
Certifications for The World Won't Listen
| Region | Certification | Certified units/sales |
|---|---|---|
| United Kingdom (BPI) | Gold | 100,000^{^} |
^{^} Shipments figures based on certification alone.

== Tribute ==
British artist Phil Collins produced an exhibition at the Dallas Museum of Art that included a three-part video project titled The World Won't Listen, which was filmed in Turkey, Indonesia and Colombia. The video features young people performing karaoke versions of songs by The Smiths.
