= Craig Gannon =

English musician (born 1966)

- Born: 30 July 1966 (age 60)
- Origin: Manchester, England
- Genres: Alternative rock; indie pop
- Occupation: Musician
- Instruments: Guitar; bass guitar

Craig Gannon (born 30 July 1966) is an English guitarist, best known for briefly working as the second guitarist in the Smiths in 1986. He is now a composer for film and television.

== Career ==
Born in Manchester, Gannon had played in bands with friends since he was 12 years old, and in 1983 joined Aztec Camera after replying to an ad in Melody Maker. In 1984, he briefly joined The Colourfield, and went on to join The Bluebells. After another brief stint in The Colourfield, when bass player Andy Rourke was fired from the Smiths in early 1986, Gannon was hired to replace him. Within a fortnight, however, Rourke was reinstated and Gannon moved to rhythm guitar, becoming the official fifth member, playing on the "Panic" and "Ask" singles and touring the UK, Canada, and the US with the band. Gannon also played on the scrapped single "You Just Haven't Earned It Yet, Baby", which was included on The World Won't Listen compilation album. After the tour ended in October 1986, Gannon was no longer part of the line-up. He played on a total of six Smiths tracks, all recorded in 1986, as well as all tracks on the live Rank album. Gannon has been affectionately known thereafter as 'The Fifth Smith'.

After leaving the Smiths, Gannon joined Brix Smith in The Adult Net and Blue Orchids. He reunited with Morrissey at his debut solo gig and 1989 singles "The Last of the Famous International Playboys" and "Interesting Drug", but that same year saw him sue Morrissey and Johnny Marr for nonpayment of wages and over the degree of his involvement in songwriting (notably for "Ask"). The matter was settled out of court for the sum of £44,000. This amount included £30,000 for unpaid wages and £14,000 in legal costs. Gannon composed the music used on the Inside The Smiths DVD, released by former Smiths Mike Joyce and Andy Rourke. In addition to this, Gannon appeared in and composed the music for a classic albums DVD of The Queen Is Dead – released in May 2008.

In the mid-1990s, he was in the initial line-up of Black Grape. He has played guitar with many other artists, including Terry Hall, Roddy Frame, Alison Moyet, Denise van Outen, Edwyn Collins, and Paul Quinn. He was also asked to join Orange Juice's James Kirk and Steven Daly's band Memphis), Buzzcocks/FOC, Robert Lloyd, Deadly Avenger, Red Venom, Vinny Peculiar, and The Family Foundation. In 2014, Gannon was asked to play with The Specials but declined.

== Discography (partial) ==
=== With the Bluebells ===
==== Non-studio-album singles ====
- "All I Am (Is Loving You)" (1985)

==== Albums ====
- Sisters (1984)
  - "Everybody's Somebody's Fool", "Red Guitars", "Syracuse University", "South Atlantic Way"

=== With the Smiths ===
==== Non-studio-album singles ====
- "Panic" (1986)
- "Ask" (1986)

==== Albums ====
- The World Won't Listen (compilation, 1987)
  - "Panic", "Ask", "London", "Half a Person", "You Just Haven't Earned It Yet, Baby" (and "Golden Lights" on post-1992 reissues)
- Louder Than Bombs (compilation, 1987)
  - "Half a Person", "London", "Panic", "Ask", "You Just Haven't Earned It Yet, Baby" and "Golden Lights"
- Rank (live, 1988 [recorded 1986])
  - Appears on all tracks
- Best... I (compilation, 1992)
  - "Half a Person" and "Panic"
- ...Best II (compilation, 1992)
  - "Ask"
- Singles (compilation, 1995)
  - "Panic" and "Ask"
- The Very Best of The Smiths (compilation, 2001)
  - "Panic" and "Ask"
- The Sound of The Smiths (compilation, 2008)
  - "Panic", "Ask", "You Just Haven't Earned It Yet Baby", "Half a Person", "London" (live version)

=== With the Cradle ===
==== Non-studio-album singles ====
- "It's Too High"

=== With Morrissey ===
==== Non-studio-album singles ====
- "The Last of the Famous International Playboys" (1989)
- "Interesting Drug" (1989)

==== Albums ====
- Bona Drag (compilation, 1990)
  - "Such a Little Thing Makes Such a Big Difference", "Interesting Drug", "The Last of the Famous International Playboys", "Lucky Lisp"
- World of Morrissey (compilation, 1995)
  - "The Last of the Famous International Playboys"
- The Best of Morrissey (compilation, 2001)
  - "The Last of the Famous International Playboys", "Interesting Drug"
- Greatest Hits (compilation, 2008)
  - "The Last of the Famous International Playboys"
- My Early Burglary Years (compilation, 1998)
  - "Michaels Bones"
- Suedehead: The Best of Morrissey (compilation, 1997)
  - "The Last of the Famous International Playboys", "Interesting Drug"

=== With Adult Net ===
==== Albums ====
- The Honey Tangle (1989)

=== With Robert Lloyd ===
==== Albums ====
- Me & My Mouth!?❊ (1990)
  - "Not Forever", "Sweet Georgia Black", "Of Course You Can't", "Man Oh Man", "Hey Roberta"

=== With Blue Orchids ===
==== Non-studio-album singles ====
- "Diamond Age" (1991)

==== Albums ====
- The Sleeper (2003)
  - "Moth", "Diamond Age"

=== With Terry Hall ===
==== Albums ====
- Home (1994)
- Laugh (1997)

=== With Vinny Peculiar ===
==== Albums ====
- The Fall and Rise of Vinny Peculiar (2006)

=== With Help Stamp Out Loneliness ===
==== Albums ====
- Help Stamp Out Loneliness (2011)
  - "Biergarten"
