= Polymorph Records =

Record label based in London, England

- Founded: 2010
- Genre: Various
- Country of origin: United Kingdom
- Location: London
- Official website: Polymorph Records

Polymorph Records is a record label based in London, England.

In 2010 they released the debut single by Jamie West, called "Give Me Everything You Got".

Their most recent release is by singer-songwriter Joshua Fisher who released his debut EP "Atlas" on 25 October 2010. It was co-produced by Roger Pusey.

Their latest signing is Jake Benson, a young singer from London.
