= The Peel Sessions (The Smiths EP) =

EP by the Smiths
- Released: October 1988
- Recorded: 18 May 1983
- Studio: Maida Vale, London
- Genre: Alternative rock
- Length: 16:19
- Language: English
- Label: Strange Fruit
- Producer: Roger Pusey

The Smiths chronology
Rank (1988)	The Peel Sessions (1988)	Best... I (1992)

Professional ratings
Review scores
Source	Rating
AllMusic	4/5 stars
The Encyclopedia of Popular Music	2/5 stars

The Peel Sessions is an EP by the English rock band the Smiths. The EP, released in 1988, was recorded on 18 May 1983 for the BBC Radio 1 disc jockey John Peel's show which was subsequently broadcast on 31 May 1983. All but "Miserable Lie" were already included on the 1984 album Hatful of Hollow.

== Track listing ==
All songs written by Morrissey and Marr.

1. "What Difference Does It Make?" – 3:12
2. "Miserable Lie" – 4:38
3. "Reel Around the Fountain" – 5:51
4. "Handsome Devil" – 2:46

== Personnel ==
Personnel taken from The Peel Sessions liner notes.

The Smiths

- Morrissey – vocals
- Johnny Marr – guitar
- Andy Rourke – bass guitar
- Mike Joyce – drums

Technical personnel

- Roger Pusey – production
