= Roger Pusey =

- Origin: London, England
- Genre: Rock
- Occupations: Radio producer Record producer
- Labels: Rough Trade; EMI; Strange Fruit; Polymorph

Roger Pusey is a former BBC Radio 1 producer who worked on the Peel Sessions. He was previously producer of the station's Tony Blackburn morning show.

He produced versions of a number of tracks for The Smiths, including "This Charming Man", "What Difference Does It Make", and "This Night Has Opened My Eyes" on the compilation albums Hatful of Hollow and Louder Than Bombs.

In addition, Pusey produced tracks for David Bowie and New Model Army.

In 2010, he co-produced the debut EP Atlas by singer-songwriter Joshua Fisher.
