= Sweet and Tender Hooligan =

Single by the Smiths
- B-side: "I Keep Mind Hidden" "Work Is a Four-Letter Word" "What's the World? (Live)"
- Released: 23 May 1995
- Recorded: 1985–1987
- Genre: Alternative rock, punk rock
- Length: 3:35
- Label: Reprise
- Composer: Johnny Marr
- Lyricist: Morrissey
- Producer: John Porter

The Smiths singles chronology
"There Is a Light That Never Goes Out" (1992)	"Sweet and Tender Hooligan" (1995)	"The Queen Is Dead" (2017)

"Sweet and Tender Hooligan" is a song by the English rock band the Smiths, written by singer Morrissey and guitarist Johnny Marr. Recorded in 1986, it was released as a single in May 1995 by Reprise Records to promote the compilation album Singles.

== Background ==
Whereas WEA in Europe opted to re-issue the 1986 single "Ask" to promote Singles, Reprise in America thought it wiser to put out a single containing rarities, even though none of them featured on the actual compilation, as neither "Sweet and Tender Hooligan" itself nor its supporting tracks had been previously released as a single. The title track had previously been recorded for the BBC and included on Louder Than Bombs and the 12" of "Sheila Take a Bow"; "I Keep Mine Hidden", "Work Is a Four-Letter Word" and "What's the World?" were previously hard-to-find B-sides to earlier singles "Girlfriend in a Coma" and "I Started Something I Couldn't Finish" (both 1987).

== Lyric ==
The lyric describes the lenient sentencing of a hooligan, with the narrator sarcastically taking the side of the criminal, saying "and he'll never ever do it again / of course he won't / not until the next time".

== Track listing ==
No.	Title	Lyrics	Music	Length
1.	"Sweet and Tender Hooligan"	Morrissey	Johnny Marr	3:35
2.	"I Keep Mine Hidden"	Morrissey	Johnny Marr	1:59
3.	"Work Is a Four-Letter Word"	Don Black	Guy Woolfenden	2:47
4.	"What's the World?" (Live in Glasgow, September 1985)	James	James	2:06
Total length:				10:26

== Artwork ==
The single cover features a still of boxer Cornelius Carr from the music video for Morrissey's single "Boxers", as directed by James O'Brien in 1995.

== Reviews ==
Professional ratings
Review scores
Source	Rating
AllMusic	3/5 stars

Jack Rabid of AllMusic described this song as "one of their great punk-inspired moments (along with 'London') and as usual, should have been the A-side anyway."
