= Still Ill =

Song by The Smiths

from the album The Smiths
- Released: 20 February 1984
- Recorded: 1983
- Genre: Alternative rock; indie pop
- Length: 3:23 (album version); 3:32 (Peel session)
- Label: Rough Trade
- Songwriters: Morrissey, Johnny Marr
- Producers: John Porter, The Smiths

"Still Ill" is a song by the English rock band the Smiths. It was written by singer Morrissey and guitarist Johnny Marr. It was featured on their self-titled debut album in February 1984. Another version of the song was included on the compilation album Hatful of Hollow in November 1984.

== Overview ==
"Still Ill" has been described both as Morrissey's "deeply personal realisation that his old dreams and freedoms were dead" and also as a reflection on his sexual orientation, in the Thatcher era. In 2018 The Independent described it as "infused with a bitterness at the country’s political failings". It is a moody and poignant song which worries that life will never again be simple and carefree. The lyrics of the song reference a nostalgia for the past ("We cannot cling to the old dreams anymore"), Morrissey's dislike for working at regular jobs, and his feelings about someone he had kissed "in the old days" but feels differently towards when kissing them in the present. It also ponders whether the body rules the mind, or vice versa. Writing in Paste, Tyler Kane notes that the song "can sound hopeful, morose and back again all within a few measures".

Morrissey took the line "Under the iron bridge we kissed, and although I ended up with sore lips ..." from Viv Nicholson's autobiography.

Johnny Marr's composition of the song, and his skilful playing of the difficult mood transitions in it, have been frequently praised. The recordings are characterised by particularly intricate bass guitar playing by The Smiths’ bassist Andy Rourke, as Marr mentions in his autobiography.

== Reception ==
"Still Ill" has been noted as "One of the best and most loved Smiths songs", and is still a staple in both Morrissey and Johnny Marr's concert set lists.

Encyclopædia Britannica notes that "songs such as 'Still Ill' sealed [Morrissey's] role as spokesman for disaffected youth".

On Consequence of Sound, T. J. Kliebhan writes that "Morrissey's brilliant use of imagery on 'Still Ill' is curtailed by his own lovely moans and empathetic malaise. The version of this song that appears on the Hatful of Hollow compilation features a nice harmonica that sounds wildly inappropriate for a Smiths song and yet feels strangely at home in this instance."

In a 2008 interview, Elvis Costello singled out the song, stating, "I loved the first Smiths album, especially 'Still Ill' and 'Reel Around The Fountain.' Morrissey's a great lyricist."

== Influence ==
A 2007 documentary about The Smiths is titled The Smiths: Still Ill. The title of the 2017 unauthorised biographical drama about Morrissey, England Is Mine, comes from the opening line of this song, "I decree today that life is simply taking and not giving/England is mine and it owes me a living". In 2017 Christopher Federico of The Washington Post titled his short opinion piece about the Affordable Care Act "The Smiths, ‘Still Ill’: The Week In One Song".
