= Shoplifters of the World Unite =

Single by the Smiths
- B-side: "London" "Half a Person"
- Released: 26 January 1987
- Recorded: November 1986
- Studio: Trident, London
- Genre: Alternative rock
- Length: 2:56
- Label: Rough Trade
- Composer: Johnny Marr
- Lyricist: Morrissey
- Producer: Johnny Marr

The Smiths singles chronology
"Some Girls Are Bigger Than Others" (1986)	"Shoplifters of the World Unite" (1987)	"Sheila Take a Bow" (1987)

Professional ratings
Review scores
Source	Rating
AllMusic	3/5 stars

"Shoplifters of the World Unite" is a song by the English rock band the Smiths, written by Morrissey and Johnny Marr. Morrissey's lyrics, which endorsed shoplifting and referenced Karl Marx, were controversial at the time of the song's release. Musically, the song continues the glam rock styling of other Smiths singles during the period and includes a short guitar solo from Marr.

"Shoplifters of the World Unite" was first released as a non-album single in January 1987, after the band decided to scrap the single release of their original A-side, "You Just Haven't Earned It Yet, Baby". The song was a commercial success, reaching number twelve in the UK, and has been included on compilation albums such as The World Won't Listen and Louder Than Bombs. It has since seen critical acclaim and Morrissey has named the song as a personal favourite.

== Background ==
Written by Morrissey and Johnny Marr, "Shoplifters of the World Unite" lyrically endorsed shoplifting and nonconformism at large. The title alludes to the slogan "Workers of the world, unite!" as well as the 1966 David and Jonathan hit "Lovers of the World Unite". During a 1987 interview with Shaun Duggan, Morrissey said of the song: "[It does] not literally mean picking up a loaf of bread or a watch and sticking it in your coat pocket. It's more or less spiritual shoplifting, cultural shoplifting, taking things and using them to your own advantage".

Musically, the song has been compared to T. Rex's "Children of the Revolution" and features a brief solo from Marr. On the solo, Marr used "harmonised layering", stating in a separate interview, "[It] is a steel player's technique. You touch the strings with a right hand finger an octave higher than where you're fretting, and then pluck the string with your thumb." Marr has cited Nils Lofgren as the inspiration for the guitar on the song; he has commented, "People have said it sounds like Brian May, but I was thinking of stacked Roy Buchanans." Marr also produced the song himself, a first for the band.

Morrissey has since spoken positively of the song, stating in a 1996 interview with RTÉ that it was one of his favourite songs. In 1997, he recalled in greater detail, "[It was] a very, very witty single and a great moment for the Smiths in England. I think it was probably the best days of our career."

== Release ==
Another newly completed song, "You Just Haven't Earned It Yet, Baby", was originally intended to be the A-side of this single. It made it to the white label test pressing stage and approximately 900 stock copies of the single were manufactured before the band decided to make "Shoplifters" the A-side instead. Marr has since stated, "'Shoplifters' was the better record," while Morrissey disliked producer John Porter's mix of "You Just Haven't Earned It Yet, Baby". This aborted single mix can be heard on The World Won't Listen, while a remixed version is included in Louder Than Bombs.

"Shoplifters of the World Unite" was released as a non-album single in January 1987, reaching number 12 in the UK singles chart. The single's sleeve features a photograph of a young Elvis Presley that was taken by James R. Reid. The British 7" and 12" vinyls contained the matrix messages: ALF RAMSEY'S REVENGE/none. The song's lyrics provoked controversy, with MP Geoffrey Dickens condemning the band for releasing an open ode to thievery and Tesco nearly suing Smash Hits for reprinting the song's lyrics on a graphic that had a Tesco grocery bag. In order to promote the song on the music programme The Tube, Morrissey agreed to state that the song's lyrics were metaphorical, although they were not intended as such.

Shortly after its release as a single, the song was included on the 1987 compilation albums The World Won't Listen and Louder Than Bombs. It has since appeared on other compilation albums, such as Singles, The Very Best of The Smiths and The Sound of The Smiths.

== Live performances ==
The Smiths performed this song in concert only once, during their last gig in December 1986 at Brixton Academy, London (just prior to the release of the song as a single). The band then mimed the song on Top of the Pops; Morrissey appeared wearing an Elvis Presley T-shirt in keeping with the single's cover artwork. It was also played live on the British music programme The Tube on 10 April 1987 (alongside their next single "Sheila Take a Bow") in the band's final live performance ever.

Morrissey has sung it in concert frequently during his solo career.

== Critical reception ==
Stephen Thomas Erlewine named the song as one of the tracks on Louder Than Bombs that he considered "definitive," while Diffuser.fm listed it among Morrissey and Marr's "best material".

Rolling Stone rated the song as the band's 24th best. Consequence ranked the song as the 17th best Smiths song, writing, "Years before he became the ringleader of the tormentors, Morrissey could instigate with the best of them. Mimicking Marx's exhortation to the workers from The Communist Manifesto, 'Shoplifters of the World Unite' advocates for low-grade larceny (whether physical or emotional) over woozy production that leaves the song sounding like the delinquent cousin of 'How Soon Is Now?'." Guitar named the song as the band's 10th greatest guitar moment, commenting, "It was Marr's spotlight-stealing solo that thrillingly shattered the Smiths' own conventions and allowed him to make his instrument really squeal."

== Track listing ==
7-inch RT195
No.	Title	Length
1.	"Shoplifters of the World Unite"	2:56
2.	"Half a Person"	3:35

12-inch RTT195
No.	Title	Length
1.	"Shoplifters of the World Unite"	2:56
2.	"London"	2:06
3.	"Half a Person"	3:35

12-inch Wrong Version RTT195
No.	Title	Length
1.	"You Just Haven't Earned It Yet, Baby"	3:34
2.	"London"	2:06
3.	"Half a Person"	3:35

== Charts ==
Chart	Peak position
Ireland (IRMA)	7
UK Singles (The Official Charts Company)	12
