= Guy Woolfenden =

English composer (1937–2016)

Guy Anthony Woolfenden OBE (12 July 1937 – 15 April 2016) was an English composer and conductor. He was head of music at the Royal Shakespeare Company in Stratford-upon-Avon for 37 years, making music an integral part of over 150 productions there. He completed scores for the full canon of Shakespeare plays.

== Biography ==
Woolfenden was born in Ipswich into a musical family, and was a chorister at Westminster Abbey Choir School. He sang at the Royal Wedding in 1947 and was a senior chorister during the 1951 Festival of Britain. From 1952 until 1956 he attended the Whitgift School in Croydon, where he started playing the French Horn, then went on to study music at Christ's College, Cambridge, and horn at the Guildhall School of Music and Drama, where he also studied conducting with Norman Del Mar. He subsequently played horn with the Sadler's Wells Opera, taking further lessons from Aubrey Brain.

In 1961 he joined the Royal Shakespeare Company in Stratford-upon-Avon, where he was Head of Music from 1963 until 1998. One of the first productions he was involved with there was The Wars of the Roses cycle of Shakespeare plays produced by Peter Hall and John Barton in 1964, for which he created special instruments. In 1976 he composed the score for Trevor Nunn’s musical version of The Comedy of Errors, which transferred to the Aldwych Theatre in 1977. The adaptation won the Olivier Award for Best New Musical. The 1978 production of The Tempest, starring Michael Hordern as Prospero and Ian Charleson as Ariel, featured songs that were later extracted as The Songs of Ariel. Similarly, the music composed for the 1982 productions of Henry IV Parts I and II was reused the following year as the suite for wind band Gallimaufry, the first of 15 major wind band pieces. By 1991 he had completed the full Shakespeare canon of 37 plays (in some cases several times over) with his score for Two Gentlemen of Verona.

Woolfenden was Artistic Director of the Cambridge Festival from 1986 to 1991. In 1995 he was a founder director of the English Music Festival which became the Stratford on Avon Music Festival. He was the Chairman of the Denne Gilkes Memorial Fund, a charity which supports young musicians and actors. Woolfenden conducted three productions with the Scottish Opera, as well as the first British productions of Nielsen's Saul and David, Tchaikovsky's Maid of Orleans and Liszt's Don Sanche. With his wife Jane he was the founder of the publishing company, Ariel Music, in Banbury, Oxfordshire.

As a conductor, Woolfenden was principal conductor for Morley College Symphony Orchestra (from 1968 until 1978), for the Liverpool Mozart Orchestra (1970–1992) and for the Warwickshire Symphony Orchestra (1972 to 2012). He was also music director at University College, London (1977–1979). He was also a radio presenter, the chairman of BBC Radio 3's music quiz Full Score from 1994 to 1996.

Woolfenden was awarded the OBE for his services to music in the New Year Honours List in 2007. He married the oboist Jane Aldrick in 1962 and they lived in the village of Sibford Ferris, North Oxfordshire for more than 40 years. There were three sons, Richard, Stephen and James.

== Composing ==
In total, Woolfenden composed over 150 scores for the Royal Shakespeare Company. He also composed incidental music for major European theatre companies, including the Comédie-Française, Paris; the Burgtheater, Vienna; the Teatro di Stabile, Genoa; and the Norwegian National Theatre, Oslo. His film scores include Work Is a Four-Letter Word (1968) and the 1968 movie version of A Midsummer Night's Dream, as well as the 1974 television version of Antony and Cleopatra.

There are also many pieces for concert wind bands, chamber ensembles and some orchestral works, a number of which have been recorded. An example is the Clarinet Concerto, written in 1985 to mark Jack Brymer’s seventieth birthday, and performed by Brymer at Warwick Arts Centre on 9th March 1985, with the Beauchamp Sinfonietta conducted by the composer. It's been recorded by Ian Scott and the Royal Ballet Sinfonia, conducted by Gavin Sutherland. His Gordian Knots music for clarinet choir, inspired by the theatre music of Henry Purcell (specifically The Gordian Knot Unty’d, 1691) was first composed in 1995 and re-scored for woodwind orchestra in 2010.

== Selected concert works ==
(for wind band, unless otherwise stated)

- Gallimaufry (1983)
- Illyrian Dances (1986)
- S.P.Q.R (1988)
- Mockbeggar Variations (1991)
- Suite Française for woodwind ensemble (1991)
- Gordian Knots (1995) and More Gordian Knots (2010)
- Curtain Call (1997)
- French Impressions (1998)
- Bassoon Concerto with full orchestra, or piano (1999)
- Rondo Variations for clarinet and wind ensemble (1999)
- Serenade for Sophia (Serenade No. 1) for wind dectet (2001)
- Firedance (2002)
- Celebration (2003)
- Bohemian Dances (2005)
- Divertimento in three movements (2007)
- Reflections (Serenade No. 2) for wind dectet (2008)
