= Louder Than Bombs =

Compilation album by the Smiths
- Released: 30 March 1987
- Recorded: 1983–1987
- Genres: Alternative rock; indie pop
- Length: 72:44
- Labels: Sire (US); Rough Trade (UK)
- Producers: Johnny Marr, Morrissey, John Porter, Roger Pusey, The Smiths, Stephen Street

The Smiths chronology
The World Won't Listen (1987)	Louder Than Bombs (1987)	Strangeways, Here We Come (1987)

Professional ratings
Review scores
Source	Rating
AllMusic	4.5/5 stars
Chicago Tribune	4/4 stars
The Encyclopedia of Popular Music	3/5 stars
NME	10/10
Pitchfork	9.4/10
The Rolling Stone Album Guide	5/5 stars
Uncut	4/5 stars
The Village Voice	B+

Louder Than Bombs is a compilation album by the English rock band the Smiths, released as a double album on 30 March 1987 by their American record company, Sire Records. It peaked at number 62 on the US Billboard 200 album chart. Popular demand prompted their British record company, Rough Trade, to issue the album domestically as well. Upon its release in the UK in May 1987, it reached No. 38 on the British charts. In 2003, the album was ranked No. 365 on Rolling Stone magazine's list of The 500 Greatest Albums of All Time, and ranked No. 369 on a 2012 revised list. The album was certified Gold by the RIAA in 1990.

== Release ==
The album was released as the American counterpart to their recent British compilation The World Won't Listen and consisted of all singles and nearly all B-sides that had not at that point been available in the United States, either on single or album, with a few other tracks added. The title is borrowed from a line in Elizabeth Smart's extended prose poem By Grand Central Station I Sat Down and Wept.

The album was intended to be a substitute for both The World Won't Listen and their 1984 compilation Hatful of Hollow, as these had not been released in the United States. This is why the non-single track "This Night Has Opened My Eyes" from Hatful of Hollow was included. Single A-sides "This Charming Man" and "How Soon Is Now?" had already been released in the US as bonus cuts on the LPs The Smiths and Meat Is Murder, respectively.

As with The World Won't Listen, this compilation includes the scrapped single "You Just Haven't Earned It Yet, Baby" (passed over in favour of "Shoplifters of the World Unite"), albeit in a different, shorter mix. However, this shorter version of the song was replaced when Bombs was reissued in 2011. Additionally, the Louder Than Bombs version of "Stretch Out and Wait" is the version from the B-side of "Shakespeare's Sister", which features slightly different lyrics. Also of note is the fact that "Ask" appears on both Louder Than Bombs and The World Won't Listen in a slightly different and longer mix than its single version.

Due to the album offering several B-sides (as well as the band's then-latest single "Sheila Take a Bow") that had never been collected onto an album before, Louder Than Bombs became very popular on import with fans in the UK. To avoid high import prices being paid, the Smiths' UK record company, Rough Trade, decided to release the album as well. The double album retailed at single album price, to help soften criticism from some fans who had already purchased The World Won't Listen three months earlier.

After WEA acquired the Smiths' back catalogue in 1992, all Smiths albums were re-released at mid price, including Louder Than Bombs.

=== Packaging ===
The cover art for Louder Than Bombs, designed by Morrissey, features British playwright Shelagh Delaney of Salford, Greater Manchester. The photograph was originally published in the Saturday Evening Post after Delaney, at the age of 19, made her literary debut with the play A Taste of Honey. The play inspired many early lyrics written by Morrissey, and the song "This Night Has Opened My Eyes" (included here) is based on the plight of the play's heroine, Jo, an unwed mother.

== Track listing ==
All tracks are written by Morrissey/Marr, except "Golden Lights", written by Twinkle, and "Oscillate Wildly", written by Johnny Marr.

Side one
No.	Title	Source	Length
1.	"Is It Really So Strange?"	B-side of "Sheila Take a Bow"; John Peel session, 2/12/86	3:04
2.	"Sheila Take a Bow"	Single A-side	2:41
3.	"Shoplifters of the World Unite"	Single A-side	2:57
4.	"Sweet and Tender Hooligan"	B-side of "Sheila Take a Bow"; John Peel session, 2/12/86	3:13
5.	"Half a Person"	B-side of "Shoplifters of the World Unite"	3:36
6.	"London"	B-side of "Shoplifters of the World Unite"	2:07

Side two
No.	Title	Source	Length
7.	"Panic"	Single A-side	2:20
8.	"Girl Afraid"	B-side of "Heaven Knows I'm Miserable Now"	2:48
9.	"Shakespeare's Sister"	Single A-side	2:09
10.	"William, It Was Really Nothing"	Single A-side	2:11
11.	"You Just Haven't Earned It Yet, Baby"	US mix of aborted single A-side	3:21
12.	"Heaven Knows I'm Miserable Now"	Single A-side	3:34

Side three
No.	Title	Source	Length
13.	"Ask"	Remix of single A-side	3:18
14.	"Golden Lights"	B-side of "Ask"	2:39
15.	"Oscillate Wildly"	B-side of "How Soon Is Now?"	3:27
16.	"These Things Take Time"	B-side of "What Difference Does It Make?"	2:23
17.	"Rubber Ring"	B-side of "The Boy with the Thorn in His Side"	3:48
18.	"Back to the Old House"	B-side of "What Difference Does It Make?"	3:05

Side four
No.	Title	Source	Length
19.	"Hand in Glove"	Single A-side mix	3:13
20.	"Stretch Out and Wait"	B-side of "Shakespeare's Sister"	2:38
21.	"Please Please Please Let Me Get What I Want"	B-side of "William, It Was Really Nothing"	1:52
22.	"This Night Has Opened My Eyes"	From Hatful of Hollow; John Peel session, 14/9/83	3:40
23.	"Unloveable"	B-side of "Bigmouth Strikes Again"	3:55
24.	"Asleep"	B-side of "The Boy with the Thorn in His Side"	4:11

== Personnel ==
- Morrissey – vocals
- Johnny Marr – guitars, piano, harmonica, slide guitar on "Panic", mandolin on "Please Please Please Let Me Get What I Want" and "Golden Lights",
- Andy Rourke – bass guitar, cello on "Shakespeare's Sister" and "Oscillate Wildly"
- Mike Joyce – drums, tambourine on "Hand in Glove" and "Stretch Out and Wait"

=== Additional musicians ===
- Craig Gannon – rhythm guitar on "Half a Person", "London", "Panic", "You Just Haven't Earned It Yet, Baby", "Ask" and "Golden Lights", lead guitar on coda of "London", mandolin on "Golden Lights"
- Kirsty MacColl – backing vocals on "Ask" and "Golden Lights"
- John Porter – slide guitar on "Sheila Take a Bow", sound effects on "Ask", drum machine and bass guitar on "Golden Lights"
- Stephen Street – additional drum machine programming on "London", sampling on "Rubber Ring", sound effects on "Asleep"

=== Production ===
- Johnny Marr – producer (A3)
- Johnny Marr, Morrissey and Stephen Street – producers (A5–6)
- Morrissey and Marr – producers (A2, C5, D5–6)
- John Porter – producer (A1, A4, B1–2, B4–6, C1-2, C4, C6, D3)
- Roger Pusey – producer (D4)
- The Smiths – producers (B3, C3, D1–2)

== Charts ==
Chart performance for Louder Than Bombs
Chart (1987)	Peak position
Canada Top Albums/CDs (RPM)	30
UK Albums (Official Charts)	38
US Billboard 200	62

== Certifications ==
Certifications for Louder Than Bombs
Region	Certification	Certified units/sales
United Kingdom (BPI)	Gold	100,000^{^}
United States (RIAA)	Gold	500,000^{^}
^{^} Shipments figures based on certification alone.
