= Girlfriend in a Coma (song) =

Single by the Smiths

from the album Strangeways, Here We Come
- B-side: "Work Is a Four-Letter Word" "I Keep Mine Hidden"
- Released: 10 August 1987
- Recorded: March–April 1987
- Studio: The Wool Hall, Beckington, Somerset
- Genre: Alternative rock; indie pop; reggae
- Length: 2:02
- Label: Rough Trade
- Composer: Johnny Marr
- Lyricist: Morrissey
- Producers: Morrissey, Johnny Marr, Stephen Street

The Smiths singles chronology
| "Sheila Take a Bow" (1987) | "Girlfriend in a Coma" (1987) | "Stop Me If You Think You've Heard This One Before" (1987) |

Music video
- "Girlfriend In A Coma" on YouTube

"Girlfriend in a Coma" is a song by the English rock band the Smiths, written by singer Morrissey and guitarist Johnny Marr. It was the first of three UK singles from the band's fourth and final studio album, Strangeways, Here We Come. Inspired by the song "To Be Young, Gifted and Black", "Girlfriend in a Coma" features a lilting acoustic guitar line performed by Marr and lyrics about a hospital-bound lover sung by Morrissey.

"Girlfriend in a Coma" was released as a single in August 1987, reaching number 13 in the UK Singles Chart. The single features a cover of the Cilla Black song "Work Is a Four-Letter Word" on the B-side, a decision made by Morrissey that infuriated Marr to the point that it became a reason for the band's break-up in the aftermath of the single's release. As a result, Morrissey appears alone in the song's music video.

"Girlfriend in a Coma" has seen critical acclaim for Marr's guitar work and Morrissey's witty lyricism. It has since appeared on multiple compilation albums and has been ranked by music writers as one of the band's best songs.

== Background ==
"Girlfriend in a Coma" was inspired by Bob and Marcia's version of the Nina Simone song "To Be Young, Gifted and Black". Marr recalled, "[Morrissey and I] both absolutely adored it. So 'Girlfriend in a Coma' was trying to capture the spirit of that. If you listen to the string parts on both you maybe can see it." Initially the band attempted to record the song with a reggae-inspired arrangement, but, unhappy with this sound, the band collaborated with co-producer Stephen Street to re-arrange it with a more gentle acoustic sound.

Marr later spoke positively of the song, commenting in 1993, "Over the last few years I've heard 'Girlfriend in a Coma' in shops and people's cars, and I'm always surprised by how good it sounds."

== Music and lyrics ==
The song's lyrics are told from the perspective of a man whose girlfriend is in a coma after an accident. The singer's anxiety is balanced by his memories of the bad times in lyrics such as "There were times when I could have murdered her/But you know I would hate anything to happen to her". The song quotes the Four Seasons' "Bye, Bye, Baby (Baby Goodbye)", a song that reached number one in the UK when covered by the Bay City Rollers. The repeated assertion "I know it's serious" is undercut by his careless tone and "the light playful accompaniment by the other members of the band". Armond White, in an article in Rolling Stone, calls "Girlfriend" a song about AIDS which responds "to the crisis that took the lives and broke the hearts of so many friends and lovers" during the 1980s.

== Release ==
Released on 10 August 1987, "Girlfriend in a Coma" was the last single by the Smiths to include newly recorded material on the B-side. It contains the band's last recorded song, "I Keep Mine Hidden", as well as a cover of a Cilla Black song, "Work Is a Four-Letter Word", both recorded in May 1987.

Morrissey's insistence on including the Cilla Black B-side annoyed Marr and he left the band soon afterwards. Marr said to Record Collector in 1992: "'Work Is a Four Letter Word' I hated. That was the last straw, really. I didn't form a group to perform Cilla Black songs. That was it, really. I made a decision that I was going to get away on holiday. The only place I could think of was L.A. L.A. was the only place I knew where there'd be sunshine, so off I went. I never saw Morrissey again".

Because of its morbid subject matter, the song received little airplay on BBC Radio 1. Morrissey later said, "You're not really supposed to like those songs. They're very depressing and not supposed to be played on radio." However, released in the wake of the Smiths' acrimonious breakup, the single reached number 13 in the UK.

The single's cover features playwright Shelagh Delaney, from a 1961 edition of A Taste of Honey. This was the second time Delaney appeared on a Smiths cover; she also appeared on the cover of the Louder Than Bombs album. The British 7" vinyl contained the matrix message: AND NEVER MORE SHALL BE SO/SO FAR SO BAD. The British 12" version contained the etching: EVERYBODY IS A FLASHER AT HEART/AND NEVER MORE SHALL BE SO.

== Music video ==
"Girlfriend in a Coma" was one of two songs on Strangeways selected to receive music videos. The song's video saw moderate success on MTV, though it only featured Morrissey, as the band had disbanded before the videos could be made. The music video, which was directed by Tim Broad, featured clips from the 1964 film The Leather Boys—as stated by White, the scene present in the music video depicts "a young man (Colin Campbell) who marries too soon and faces doubts about his masculinity, egged-on by his equally immature wife (Rita Tushingham)".

Morrissey was hesitant to take part in the videos, but was implored by Rough Trade's Geoff Travis to participate in order to boost the album's singles. Morrissey recalled in his autobiography, "Tim Broad steps in to make sense of it all, hotch-podging two videos for both 'Girlfriend in a Coma' and 'Stop Me If You Think You've Heard This One Before'. The results for both are frustratingly unwatchable, although Tim did his best with such a mealy-mouthed budget." (Note: Morrissey recalled Travis allocating a budget of twelve-thousand pounds for both videos.)

== Critical reception ==
"Girlfriend in a Coma" has seen critical acclaim since its release. David Browne of Rolling Stone praised the song's "bright acoustic guitars" for "add[ing] a folksy grace" to the track. Tim DiGravina of AllMusic named the song as a highlight of Strangeways, stating, "Punchy and fun, yet sad and tender, 'Girlfriend in a Coma' is a gleaming, romantic treat from a band crafting brilliant, genre-defining music in the turmoil of its dying days."

Rolling Stone ranked the song as the 34th best Smiths' song, while NME named it the band's 20th best. Guitar named the song as the band's 17th greatest guitar moment, concluding, "Despite the higher watermarks elsewhere on Strangeways, it's still 'Girlfriend in a Coma''s hooky little acoustic earworm that sticks in our grey matter the longest". Consequence ranked the song as the band's 23rd best, writing, "there's something so appealing about how Marr's upbeat composition clashes with the blacker-than-black comedy of Morrissey's lyrics."

Author Douglas Coupland named his 1998 novel Girlfriend in a Coma after the song.

In 1990, Soviet rock band Kino released their seventh and final untitled studio album, which included the song "Kogda tvoya devushka bol'na" (Russian: «Когда твоя девушка больна», lit. 'When Your Girlfriend is Sick'). Vitaly Kalgin pointed out similarities between "Kogda tvoya devushka bol'na" and "Girlfriend in a Coma" in a 2015 biography of Kino lead singer Viktor Tsoi.

== Track listing ==
All tracks are written by Morrissey and Johnny Marr, except where noted.

7" RT197
| No. | Title | Length |
|---|---|---|
| 1. | "Girlfriend in a Coma" | 2:02 |
| 2. | "Work Is a Four-Letter Word" (edited) (Guy Woolfenden, Don Black) | 2:09 |

12" RTT197 / Cassette RTT197C
| No. | Title | Length |
|---|---|---|
| 1. | "Girlfriend in a Coma" | 2:02 |
| 2. | "Work Is a Four-Letter Word" (Woolfenden, Black) | 2:45 |
| 3. | "I Keep Mine Hidden" | 1:57 |

== Charts ==
| Chart (1987) | Peak position |
|---|---|
| Ireland (IRMA) | 12 |
| Italy Airplay (Music & Media) | 20 |
| UK Singles (The Official Charts Company) | 13 |
