= Ask (song) =

Single by the Smiths
- B-side: "Cemetry Gates"; "Golden Lights"
- Released: 20 October 1986
- Recorded: June 1986
- Studio: Jam (London, England)
- Genre: Alternative rock; indie pop; jangle pop
- Length: 2:59 (single version); 3:18 (compilation version); 3:10 (The Very Best... version)
- Label: Rough Trade
- Composer: Johnny Marr
- Lyricist: Morrissey
- Producer: John Porter

The Smiths singles chronology
"Panic" (1986)	"Ask" (1986)	"Some Girls Are Bigger Than Others" (1986)

"Ask" is a song recorded by the English rock band the Smiths. It was released as a single on 20 October 1986 through Rough Trade Records. Credited to vocalist Morrissey and guitarist Johnny Marr, "Ask" is an ostensibly upbeat, positive pop song built around major chords. Its lyrics discuss shyness and encourage listeners to overcome their inhibitions. Its multiple guitar parts and complex production led to disagreements regarding its final mix. Craig Gannon, who at the time was rhythm guitarist for the group, has claimed he wrote – and was denied credit for – the song's chord structure.

"Ask" continued the Smiths' top-20 streak in their native country, peaking at number 14 on the UK Singles Chart. It reached number nine on the Irish Singles Chart. Filmmaker Derek Jarman directed the song's music video. Like most of the Smiths' singles, it was not included on a studio album. It can be found on the compilations The World Won't Listen and Louder Than Bombs (both 1987) as well as the live album Rank (1988).

== Background ==
"Ask" was written as an intentionally more lighthearted song than its predecessor single, "Panic". Morrissey said: "If the next single had been a slight protest, regardless of the merits of the actual song, people would say, 'Here we go again'".

The song's lyric includes the couplet "Writing frightening verse / To a buck-toothed girl in Luxembourg", which has been interpreted as a reference to Morrissey's youth, in which he frequently wrote letters to pen pals. Simon Goddard, the author of Mozipedia, also traces the line "Nature is a language - can't you read?" to Alan Bennett's 1978 teleplay Me! I'm Afraid of Virginia Woolf, which contained the line "Nature has a language, you see, if only we'd learn to read it." Goddard additionally commented on the lyric as a whole, writing: "...a superficial plea to liberate one's inhibitions, the crux of 'Ask' appears to be its protagonist's own fizzling sexual repression, amplified in Morrissey's exaggerated use of upper case in its printed lyrics [sic] and his vivid metaphor of sexual desire as a unifying explosive."

== Recording and composition ==
"Ask" was recorded in June 1986 with producer John Porter at Jam Studios in London. Kirsty MacColl provides backing vocals on the song. According to the sheet music published at Musicnotes.com, by Alfred Music Publishing, the song is written in the key of G major, and moves at a tempo of 167 beats per minute. The general chord progression of the song is made from the progression G - Am - C - D. Morrissey's vocals in the song span from the note of G_{4} to the note of E_{5}. The song contains over five guitar parts, including duelling strumming between Marr and guitarist Craig Gannon, who played Martin acoustics. Gannon was briefly a member of the band that year as rhythm guitarist, and has claimed he wrote the song's opening chord sequence and was cheated out of royalties:

Me and Johnny were sat in the library playing acoustic guitars and they must have been miked up as we were probably putting down the acoustic tracks for 'Panic'. I just started playing the chord sequence which would later become 'Ask' in exactly the way it appears on the record. [...] The only section of the chord structure that I didn't come up with for 'Ask' was the middle eight section with the chords E-minor, D and C. That was actually what Johnny came up with. [...] Up until the release of 'Ask' I still thought I'd be given a writing credit.

Goddard states that "[a]s a common ascending chord configuration, it's not beyond reason that Gannon may have stumbled across something very close to it. However, without necessarily disputing Gannon's claim [...] Marr had used the exact same chord sequence within a home demo of what later became 'Is It Really So Strange?' several months earlier and was subconsciously predisposed to those specific chords to use them again as the basis of 'I Won't Share You'." Marr himself disputed Gannon's claim in the book Morrissey and Marr: The Severed Alliance. In terms of genre, "Ask" has been variously described as alternative rock, indie pop, and jangle pop.

== Release ==
"Ask"
The chorus section of "Ask", including its subsequent incorporation of sound effects, including waves and seagulls.

The song was initially to be mixed by Porter at Jam Studios. "Originally "Ask" was a bit of a tour de force and it was pretty complicated. ... Then there was this bit in the middle where they wanted the sound of a waterfall crashing, all with guitars. [...] It was a jigsaw puzzle. You needed six hands to mix it properly and we didn't have automation at Jam Studios," Porter said. Goddard reports that Morrissey was threatened by Porter and Marr's camaraderie in the studio, and instead requested that Steve Lillywhite, MacColl's husband, mix "Ask" at his home studio in the London Borough of Ealing. Marr was unhappy with the song's final mix, commenting, "I couldn't understand why it was being tampered with because it all came together very simply and with a definite sense of purpose. [The final version] wasn't dramatically different, but it felt kind of a little bit muted. Less spirited, absolutely".

"Ask" was released as the Smiths' twelfth single on 20 October 1986 on both 7" and 12" formats; a limited release in the USA via Sire Records occurred the next month. It continued a streak of top 20 singles for the group, peaking at number 14 on the UK Singles Chart during the week ending 2 November 1986. The song also charted in Ireland, where it peaked at number 9 on the Irish Singles Chart. On 6 February 1995, the single was re-released, and charted on the UK Singles Chart again, peaking at number 62. The single's sleeve cover depicts actress Yootha Joyce on the set of the 1965 film Catch Us If You Can. The same photograph was used on the 1986 German-only single release of "Some Girls Are Bigger Than Others".

There are two versions of this song. The version that appears on the single releases and the compilation The Very Best of The Smiths (2001) fades out slightly sooner and has the vocal track lasting until the end of the song. The backing vocals in this version are also mixed differently and are louder. The version that appears on all albums (save for the one listed above) fades out later (though the end of the track is audible, albeit at a very low level) and has the vocal track ending before the fade begins.

== Music video ==
Filmmaker Derek Jarman directed the song's music video. A version mixing in live performance footage of the band was created; it is available on The Complete Picture (1992), a compilation home video release of the Smiths' videos and promotional films. In 1988, another video of the band playing live was issued to promote the release of Rank, the group's sole live album; it was directed by Peter Fowler and takes its footage from a live show while Gannon was still a member of the band.

== Credits and personnel ==
Credits adapted from the 12" single sleeve and label.

Locations

- Recorded at Jam Studios in London, England

Personnel

- Morrissey – vocals
- Johnny Marr – guitar, harmonica
- Mike Joyce – drums, percussion
- Andy Rourke – bass guitar
- Craig Gannon – rhythm guitar
- Kirsty MacColl – backing vocals
- John Porter – production
- Steve Lillywhite – mixing engineer

== Track listing ==
7" RT194
No.	Title	Length
1.	"Ask" (single version)	2:59
2.	"Cemetry Gates"	2:39

12" RTT194/CD RTT194CD
No.	Title	Length
1.	"Ask" (single version)	2:59
2.	"Cemetry Gates"	2:39
3.	"Golden Lights"	2:38

Later re-releases of the "Ask" single would include the album version, which runs for 3:15, instead of the single version included on the original pressings.

== Charts ==
Chart (1986)	Peak position
Ireland (IRMA)	9
UK Singles (Official Charts)	14

Chart (1995)	Peak position
UK Singles (Official Charts)	62
