= Sheila Take a Bow =

Single by the Smiths
- B-side: "Is It Really So Strange?"; "Sweet and Tender Hooligan"
- Released: 13 April 1987
- Recorded: January 1987
- Studio: Good Earth (London)
- Genre: Alternative rock
- Length: 2:41
- Label: Rough Trade
- Composer: Johnny Marr
- Lyricist: Morrissey
- Producers: Morrissey; Johnny Marr; Stephen Street

The Smiths singles chronology
"Shoplifters of the World Unite" (1987)	"Sheila Take a Bow" (1987)	"Girlfriend in a Coma" (1987)

Professional ratings
Review scores
Source	Rating
AllMusic	3/5 stars

"Sheila Take a Bow" is a song by the English rock band the Smiths, written by Morrissey and Johnny Marr. Featuring a glam rock-style beat and guitar riff, the song was originally planned to feature Sandie Shaw on backing vocals, but Shaw's distaste for the song and Morrissey's illness during her session resulted in the vocals not being used.

"Sheila Take a Bow" was released as a non-album single in April 1987, and tied with "Heaven Knows I'm Miserable Now" as the band's highest charting UK single, reaching number ten on the charts. It has since seen positive critical reception for Morrissey's uplifting lyricism and Marr's guitar work. The song was included on the compilation album Louder Than Bombs, also released in 1987.

== Background ==
"Sheila Take a Bow" was co-written by Smiths lead vocalist Morrissey and guitarist Johnny Marr. Musically, Marr sought to channel the glam rock influences of their single "Panic", later recalling, "I was going for a Mott the Hoople sound, but it ended up like Mott the Hoople as performed by the Salvation Army Band. Which is very Smiths." Lyrically, the song is an homage to Shelagh Delaney, whose work, particularly on A Taste of Honey (1958), was greatly influential to Morrissey.

The production of the single was troublesome. Morrissey planned to bring back Sandie Shaw and have her as a second vocalist. Shaw had earlier collaborated with the Smiths in 1984 on versions of "Hand in Glove", "Jeane" and "I Don't Owe You Anything". However, when she arrived to record with the band on 13 December 1986, Morrissey was ill. Shaw recorded her vocals, but her version was ultimately scrapped. She later said she "thought it was a horrid song", and scoffed at the notion of being a backing vocalist. Drummer Mike Joyce recalled:

There was no sign of Morrissey for a couple of hours. Sandie was getting a bit frantic. In the end she phoned up Morrissey and managed to get hold of him. She was saying, "Just hum me the tune down the phone that you want me to do!" I think she took it all personally.

For an early version of the track, the band reunited with producer John Porter, who had previously produced the band's debut studio album. This version, featuring a prominent sitar-sounding riff, was deemed unsatisfactory by the group and scrapped. The single was re-recorded with Stephen Street as producer. Street's version removed the sitar-esque line and used a brief audio clip of a marching temperance band from the film Hobson's Choice (1954) in the song's intro. Marr cited this horn sample as an example of the band's fusing of "pop" and the "avant-garde," commenting, "We were excited to bring that to Smiths records, whether it was 'Sheila Take A Bow,' starting off with the brass band playing, starting a pop single with that. That was a subversive act."

"Sheila Take a Bow" was among the Smiths songs written during this period where Marr used a 12-string Gibson ES-335.

== Release ==
"Sheila Take a Bow" was released as a single in April 1987, the fourth and final non-album single the band released between The Queen Is Dead (1986) and Strangeways, Here We Come (1987). The single reached number 10 in the UK Singles Chart, the joint highest chart placing of any single by the Smiths during the band's lifetime. The song was also released on the 1987 compilation Louder Than Bombs. The single's two B-sides, Peel Session versions of "Is It Really So Strange?" and "Sweet and Tender Hooligan", are also featured on Louder Than Bombs.

A music video was to be filmed, but Morrissey refused to show up for the taping at Brixton Academy. A makeshift video recorded from an appearance on the television show Top of the Pops was subsequently used instead.

The single's cover features transgender actress and frequent Andy Warhol collaborator Candy Darling on the set of the 1971 film Women in Revolt. The British 7-inch and 12-inch vinyls contained the matrix messages: COOK BERNARD MATTHEWS / none.

== Live performances ==
"Sheila Take a Bow" was performed live only twice by the Smiths, having the distinction of being the last song ever played by the group in front of an audience. It was performed live on the British music program The Tube on 10 April 1987 (alongside previous single "Shoplifters of the World Unite"), and on Top of the Pops on 23 April 1987 (but the band were miming to the studio version for this performance). The performance on The Tube would ultimately be the band's final live performance. Morrissey performed this song live for the first time as a solo artist on 14 March 2012 in Lima, Peru.

== Critical reception ==
Stephen Thomas Erlewine named the song as one of the tracks on Louder Than Bombs that he considered "definitive," while Diffuser.fm listed it among Morrissey and Marr's "best material."

The A.V. Club ranked the song first on their list of seven uplifting Morrissey songs, commenting, "'Sheila Take A Bow,' one of the Smiths' singles from 1986, is built on one of Johnny Marr's most swaggering guitar riffs—and Morrissey's lyrics verge on a pep talk. ... For someone who's always been accused of wallowing in his own misery, and enabling his fans to do the same, it’s an upbeat about-face." Rolling Stone rated the song as the band's 33rd best, writing, "Some fans were horrified at the totally unironic warmth of this single, but Moz sincerely roots for Sheilas everywhere to rise up and boot the world in the crotch." Consequence also ranked the song as the 33rd best Smiths song, writing, "The track's Bowie-esque feel evidently struck a chord with the public, as it went on to become the highest-charting single of the band's lifetime. Sheila take a bow, indeed."

== Track listing ==
7-inch RT196
No.	Title	Length
1.	"Sheila Take a Bow"	2:41
2.	"Is It Really So Strange?" (Peel Session, 17/12/86)	3:04

12-inch RTT196
No.	Title	Length
1.	"Sheila Take a Bow"	2:41
2.	"Is It Really So Strange?" (Peel Session, 17/12/86)	3:04
3.	"Sweet and Tender Hooligan" (Peel Session 17/12/86)	3:35

CD LICD9.00308L (Germany)
No.	Title	Length
1.	"Sheila Take a Bow"	2:41
2.	"Is It Really So Strange?" (Peel Session, 17/12/86)	3:04
3.	"Sweet and Tender Hooligan" (Peel Session, 17/12/86)	3:35
4.	"Shoplifters of the World Unite"	2:57
5.	"Half a Person"	3:36
6.	"Panic"	2:20
7.	"London"	2:07

== Charts ==
Chart	Peak position
Ireland (IRMA)	3
UK Singles (The Official Charts Company)	10
