= The Boy with the Thorn in His Side =

Single by the Smiths

from the album The Queen Is Dead
- B-side: "Rubber Ring"; "Asleep"
- Released: 16 September 1985
- Recorded: August 1985
- Studio: Drone (Manchester)
- Genre: Alternative rock; indie pop
- Length: 3:17 (single version); 3:15 (album version); 3:18 (alternate mix)
- Label: Rough Trade
- Composer: Johnny Marr
- Lyricist: Morrissey
- Producers: The Smiths (single); Morrissey and Johnny Marr (album version)

The Smiths singles chronology
"The Headmaster Ritual" (1985)	"The Boy with the Thorn in His Side" (1985)	"Bigmouth Strikes Again" (1986)

"The Boy with the Thorn in His Side" is a song by the English rock band the Smiths. It was released as a single in September 1985, reaching No. 23 in the UK Singles Chart. A remixed version appeared on their third studio album, The Queen Is Dead, in June 1986.

This was the first single by the Smiths to be accompanied by a promotional music video, which was directed by Ken O'Neill, something the band had previously resisted. They also performed the song on an episode of Top of the Pops. The main difference between the single version and the album version is in the use of synthesised strings, which are absent from the single version. In 2003, Morrissey named it his favourite Smiths song.

== Background ==
Margi Clarke asked Morrissey if this song was inspired by Oscar Wilde, and Morrissey replied: "No, that's not true. The thorn is the music industry and all those people who never believed anything I said, tried to get rid of me and wouldn't play the records. So I think we've reached a stage where we feel: if they don't believe me now, will they ever believe me? What more can a poor boy do?"

== Track listing ==
7" RT191
No.	Title	Length
1.	"The Boy with the Thorn in His Side"	3:17
2.	"Asleep"	4:09

12" RTT191
No.	Title	Length
1.	"The Boy with the Thorn in His Side"	3:17
2.	"Rubber Ring/Asleep"	7:56

CD single RTT191
No.	Title	Length
1.	"The Boy with the Thorn in His Side"	3:17
2.	"Rubber Ring"	3:48
3.	"Asleep"	4:10

The original 12" and CD singles have "Rubber Ring" and "Asleep" segued into a continuous piece with the voice sample at the end of the former looped and faded into the wind noise preceding the latter. Described by Simon Goddard (in Songs That Saved Your Life, 2nd edition, p. 154) as a "spectacular combination"—a suggestion with which Johnny Marr concurs—this carefully executed sequence could only be found on the original 12" single, before the 2017 release of the remaster/re-issue of The Queen Is Dead, which includes the same songs with the same segue as tracks 10 and 11 (respectively) of its "Additional Recordings" bonus disc. The two tracks are separated on all other compilations.

== Personnel ==
Personnel taken from The Queen Is Dead liner notes, except where noted.

The Smiths

- Morrissey – vocals
- Johnny Marr – guitars, sampler (string sounds), marimba
- Andy Rourke – bass guitar
- Mike Joyce – drums

== Artwork and matrix message ==
The jumping man on the sleeve cover of the single release is a young Truman Capote.

The British 7" and 12" versions contain the etchings: ARTY BLOODY FARTY/IS THAT CLEVER...JM. "Is that clever" is an allusion to a piece of sampled dialogue in "Rubber Ring" taken from The Importance of Being Earnest, a play that was referenced in the etchings of "William, It Was Really Nothing" and Hatful of Hollow. "JM" is a reference to Johnny Marr, and was also an etching on the Sandie Shaw version of "Hand in Glove".

== Charts ==
Chart (1985)	Peak position
Ireland (IRMA)	15
UK Singles (The Official Charts Company)	23
UK Indie	1

== Certifications ==
Region	Certification	Certified units/sales
United Kingdom (BPI)	Silver	200,000^{‡}
^{‡} Sales+streaming figures based on certification alone.

== Reception ==
Professional ratings
Review scores
Source	Rating
Allmusic	4/5 stars

Jack Rabid of Allmusic called this single "great ... just another feather in a jeweled cap".

== Cover versions ==
The song was covered by Scottish band Bis on the tribute album The Smiths Is Dead. Reviewer Stephen Thomas Erlewine harshly criticised the cover, writing: "Bis utterly disembowel 'The Boy with the Thorn in His Side' with a single-minded stupidity that is just bewildering."

A cover version recorded by Jeff Buckley in 1993 was distributed by Columbia Records as a 7" in 2016 On 2 March 2010 - 28 December 2014. It later featured on Buckley's 2016 posthumously released compilation album You and I.

American indie rock bands Jejune and Lazycain released a split EP together in 1999 where they each covered Smiths songs; Jejune covered "The Boy with the Thorn in His Side", Lazycain covered "Handsome Devil".

The song was additionally covered by Belle & Sebastian, Scott Matthews, Emilie Autumn, Xiu Xiu, Dinosaur Jr's J Mascis and The Cat Empire in live performances.

== In popular culture ==
- The third episode of the 2004 BBC musical miniseries Blackpool features "The Boy with the Thorn in His Side", sung by David Tennant.
- The accompanying B-side, "Asleep", which did not appear on The Queen Is Dead, is referenced several times by the main character in Stephen Chbosky's 1999 novel The Perks of Being a Wallflower, and was also featured in the book's film adaptation.
- "Asleep" appears as one of the tracks on the final mix CD in the 2005 novel As Simple As Snow by Gregory Galloway.
- In the 2011 film Sucker Punch, Emily Browning's character sings "Asleep".
