= Hatful of Hollow =

1984 compilation album by the Smiths

Compilation album by the Smiths
- Released: November 12, 1984
- Recorded: 1983–1984
- Genres: Alternative rock; jangle pop; indie pop; post-punk
- Length: 56:11
- Label: Rough Trade
- Producers: John Porter; The Smiths; Roger Pusey; Dale "Buffin" Griffin
- Compiler: The Smiths

The Smiths chronology
The Smiths (1984)	Hatful of Hollow (1984)	Meat Is Murder (1985)

Professional ratings
Review scores
Source	Rating
AllMusic	5/5 stars
Blender	3/5 stars
Chicago Tribune	4/4 stars
Pitchfork	10/10
Q	5/5 stars
Record Mirror	4/5 stars
The Rolling Stone Album Guide	3/5 stars
Select	5/5
Sounds	4/5 stars
Uncut	5/5 stars

Hatful of Hollow is a compilation album by the English rock band the Smiths, released on November 12, 1984 in the United Kingdom, by Rough Trade Records. The album features tracks from BBC Radio 1 sessions, their first single "Hand in Glove" (a different mix of which had been included on the band's debut album released earlier in the year) and two new singles and their B-sides. It was eventually released in the United States on 9 November 1993 by Sire Records, which had initially declined to release the album in the country. Sire instead added the song “How Soon Is Now?” to the American version of the band’s 1985 LP, Meat Is Murder, and later released the double-album Louder Than Bombs in the US in 1987, which is effectively a hybrid of Hatful of Hollow and a subsequent UK compilation album The World Won't Listen, along with additional songs that do not appear on either.

Hatful of Hollow reached No. 7 on the UK Albums Chart, remaining on the chart for 46 weeks. In 2000, Q placed the album at No. 44 on its list of the "100 Greatest British Albums Ever".

== Composition ==
The album consists mainly of songs recorded over several BBC Radio 1 sessions in 1983. Tracks shown in bold were included on the album.

1. For John Peel on 18 May 1983 (broadcast 1 June): "**What Difference Does It Make?**", "Miserable Lie", "**Reel Around the Fountain**", "**Handsome Devil**" (all four songs were later released as the Peel Sessions EP)
2. For David Jensen on 26 June 1983 (broadcast 4 July): "**These Things Take Time**", "**You've Got Everything Now**", "Wonderful Woman"
3. For Jensen on 25 August 1983 (broadcast 5 September): "**Accept Yourself**", "I Don't Owe You Anything", "Pretty Girls Make Graves", "Reel Around the Fountain"
4. For Peel on 14 September 1983 (broadcast 21 September): "**This Charming Man**", "**Back to the Old House**", "**This Night Has Opened My Eyes**", "**Still Ill**"

When first broadcast, these radio sessions featured songs which were otherwise unavailable, with the exception of "Handsome Devil", a version of which had already appeared as the B-side to the "Hand in Glove" single. All were subsequently re-recorded for singles or for the band's debut album the following year. "This Night Has Opened My Eyes" was recorded in the studio in June 1984, but the only version ever released was the September Peel session.

"This Charming Man" was specifically written for the band's second Peel session. It was an attempt by Johnny Marr to emulate both the work of labelmates Aztec Camera and the Supremes' "You Can't Hurry Love".

Hatful of Hollow also features the band's debut single "Hand in Glove", as well as their two most recent singles prior to the album's release, "Heaven Knows I'm Miserable Now" and "William, It Was Really Nothing", along with their respective B-sides, "Girl Afraid", "How Soon Is Now?" and "Please Please Please Let Me Get What I Want".

"How Soon Is Now?" would receive a separate single release in 1985 in both the UK and the US and was added to the US version of The Smiths’ subsequent studio album Meat Is Murder. The single reached No. 24 in the British charts, but failed to chart in the US. Morrissey and Marr lamented the lack of chart success of what they considered their strongest song thus far.

== Song differences ==
The radio session versions of songs differ from other studio recordings. Some of the major differences include:

- "What Difference Does It Make?" is played in a higher key than the version on The Smiths.
- "These Things Take Time" is less streamlined than the version on the "What Difference Does It Make?" 12-inch single.
- "This Charming Man" lacks the guitar intro that would later appear on the single release. The rhythm and beat features more of a Motown influence, and the song lacks the sudden dramatic pauses of the later studio version.
- "Still Ill" opens and closes with a harmonica solo, played by Marr, and is slightly slower than the version on The Smiths.
- "You've Got Everything Now" is more raw than the version on The Smiths and also does not feature any of the latter's keyboard parts.
- "Back to the Old House" is an acoustic performance, featuring just Morrissey and Marr, as opposed to the full band version on the "What Differences Does It Make?" single.
- "Reel Around the Fountain" lacks the keyboard parts played by Paul Carrack that are present on the album version of The Smiths. Michael Hann of The Guardian opined that the Peel version is "a grave and stately thing, with Marr's spectral and sparse guitar-playing draped over the song like gauze," adding that that the later version on The Smiths was transformed into a "conventional country-pop song", and that the bassline was changed.

In addition, the original single version of "Hand in Glove" is included, as opposed to the remixed version by John Porter that appears on The Smiths. It features a fade-in and fade-out and more prominent bass from Andy Rourke.

== Cover and artwork ==
The cover was photographed by Gilles Decroix and features model Fabrice Colette, adorned with a tattoo inspired by a drawing by Jean Cocteau. The photograph was taken from a July 1983 special edition of the French newspaper Libération. In 1987, the album cover was redesigned and the photograph was cropped, which removed the tattoo.

Additionally, the old cover had a large sky-blue frame with the legends "The Smiths" and "Hatful of Hollow" above and striking through the picture. Editions after 1987 feature the cropped version with the text superimposed, although the 2011 vinyl re-issue reinstated the original sleeve.

"THE IMPOTENCE OF ERNEST" is etched into the runout groove of side A. As well as being a pun on Oscar Wilde's The Importance of Being Earnest, it is an allusion to the impotence that Ernest Hemingway suffered in his final years. "Ian (EIRE)", etched on side B, refers to Marr's younger brother.

== Track listing ==
Track source information adapted from Dig!. All lyrics are written by Morrissey; all music is composed by Johnny Marr.

Side one
No.	Title	Source	Length
1.	"William, It Was Really Nothing"	Single A-side	2:09
2.	"What Difference Does It Make?"	John Peel session, 18 May 1983	3:11
3.	"These Things Take Time"	David Jensen session, 26 June 1983	2:32
4.	"This Charming Man"	Peel session, 14 September 1983	2:42
5.	"How Soon Is Now?"	B-side of "William, It Was Really Nothing"	6:44
6.	"Handsome Devil"	Peel session, 18 May 1983	2:47
7.	"Hand in Glove"	Single A-side mix	3:13
8.	"Still Ill"	Peel session, 14 September 1983	3:32

Side two
No.	Title	Source	Length
1.	"Heaven Knows I'm Miserable Now"	Single A-side	3:33
2.	"This Night Has Opened My Eyes"	Peel session, 14 September 1983	3:39
3.	"You've Got Everything Now"	Jensen session, 26 June 1983	4:18
4.	"Accept Yourself"	Jensen session, 25 August 1983	4:01
5.	"Girl Afraid"	B-side of "Heaven Knows I'm Miserable Now"	2:48
6.	"Back to the Old House"	Peel session, 14 September 1983	3:02
7.	"Reel Around the Fountain"	Peel session, 18 May 1983	5:51
8.	"Please Please Please Let Me Get What I Want"	B-side of "William, It Was Really Nothing"	1:50
Total length:			56:11

== Personnel ==
Credits adapted from LP liner notes, except where otherwise noted.

The Smiths

- Morrissey – vocals
- Johnny Marr – guitars, harmonica, mandolins; slide guitar on "How Soon Is Now?"
- Andy Rourke – bass guitar
- Mike Joyce – drums; tambourine

Additional musicians

- John Porter – electronic percussion on "How Soon Is Now?"

Technical

- Roger Pusey – producer (2, 4, 6, 8, 10, 14, 15)
- Dale Griffin – producer (3, 11)
- John Porter – producer (1, 5, 9, 12, 13, 16)
- The Smiths – producers (7)
- Morrissey – sleeve
- Caryn Gough – layout
- Martin Colley – engineer (3, 11)
- Mike Robinson – engineer (12)
- Gilles Decroix – cover photographer
- Fabrice Colette – cover model

== Charts ==
Chart performance for Hatful of Hollow
Chart (1984–1985)	Peak position
Canada Top Albums/CDs (RPM)	91
New Zealand Albums (RMNZ)	21
Swedish Albums (Sverigetopplistan)	28
UK Albums Chart	7

== Certifications and sales ==
Certifications and sales for Hatful of Hollow
Region	Certification	Certified units/sales
United Kingdom (BPI)	Platinum	300,000^{^}
United States	—	133,809
^{^} Shipments figures based on certification alone.

== See also ==
- List of 1980s albums considered the best
