= Heaven Knows I'm Miserable Now =

1984 song by the Smiths

Single by the Smiths
- B-side: "Suffer Little Children"; "Girl Afraid"
- Released: 21 May 1984
- Recorded: March 1984
- Studio: Fallout Shelter (Island), London
- Genre: Alternative rock; jangle pop
- Length: 3:35
- Label: Rough Trade
- Composer: Johnny Marr
- Lyricist: Morrissey
- Producer: John Porter

The Smiths singles chronology
"What Difference Does It Make?" (1984)	"Heaven Knows I'm Miserable Now" (1984)	"William, It Was Really Nothing" (1984)

Professional ratings
Review scores
Source	Rating
AllMusic	3/5 stars

"Heaven Knows I'm Miserable Now" is a song by English rock band the Smiths. Released as a single in May 1984, it reached No. 10 on the UK Singles Chart, making it the band's first top ten single. It was later included on the November 1984 compilation album Hatful of Hollow and the March 1987 compilation album Louder Than Bombs. The song is listed as one of the Rock and Roll Hall of Fame's 500 Songs that Shaped Rock and Roll.

== Background ==
The music was written by Johnny Marr in an hour in a New York hotel room on 2 January 1984, using a red Gibson ES-355 guitar that was bought for him that day by Seymour Stein. After finishing the song, he wrote the music for B-side "Girl Afraid" the same evening. Marr considers the two songs "a pair".

The song is notable for marking the beginning of producer Stephen Street's working relationship with the band. As one of his first roles as "in-house engineer" at Island Records' Fallout Shelter studios, Street engineered the session. He was aware of the band and excited by the prospect, saying in a HitQuarters interview, "I'd seen them just shortly beforehand on Top of the Pops doing 'This Charming Man', and like most other people around that time who were into music I was really excited by them." Although not contacted for the subsequent recording "William, It Was Really Nothing", Street was asked to engineer the Smiths' next album, Meat Is Murder, with Morrissey and Marr producing for the first time.

The cover features Viv Nicholson, who became famous in 1961 in the UK for winning a large amount of money on the football pools and then rapidly squandering it. The song's title was inspired by Sandie Shaw's 1969 single "Heaven Knows I'm Missing Him Now".

The band's performance of the song on Channel 4's Earsay on 31 March 1984 features mixed footage of the band playing in a studio and footage of Morrissey walking around some wasteland located next door to the Hewart Studios (now Capital Studios) in Wandsworth, London where Earsay was recorded, with daffodil flowers in his hands and unidentified foliage in the back pocket of his jeans.

== Cultural references ==
Journalist Andrew Collins borrowed the song's title for the name of his autobiographical book Heaven Knows I'm Miserable Now: My Difficult Student 80s, published in 2004. The title of "Girl Afraid" is taken from the 1943 film Old Acquaintance, starring Bette Davis and Miriam Hopkins. Hopkins's character Mildred Watson Drake is a successful author who writes a novel titled Girl Afraid.

== Track listing ==
7-inch RT156
No.	Title	Length
1.	"Heaven Knows I'm Miserable Now"	3:34
2.	"Suffer Little Children"	5:27

- in original green sleeve

12-inch RTT156/CD RTT156CD
No.	Title	Length
1.	"Heaven Knows I'm Miserable Now"	3:34
2.	"Girl Afraid"	2:46
3.	"Suffer Little Children"	5:27

== Etchings on vinyl ==
British 7-inch: SMITHS INDEED / ILL FOREVER

British 12-inch: SMITHS PRESUMABLY / FOREVER ILL

== Charts ==
Chart (1984)	Peak position
Irish Singles Chart	11
UK Singles Chart	10
UK Indie	1

== Certifications ==
Region	Certification	Certified units/sales
United Kingdom (BPI)	Platinum	600,000^{‡}
^{‡} Sales+streaming figures based on certification alone.
