= Bigmouth Strikes Again =

Single by the Smiths

from the album The Queen Is Dead
- B-side: "Money Changes Everything"; "Unloveable"
- Released: 19 May 1986
- Recorded: August–September 1985
- Studio: RAK, London
- Genre: Jangle pop; post-punk; alternative rock
- Length: 3:12
- Label: Rough Trade
- Composer: Johnny Marr
- Lyricist: Morrissey
- Producers: Morrissey, Johnny Marr

The Smiths singles chronology
| "The Boy with the Thorn in His Side" (1985) | "Bigmouth Strikes Again" (1986) | "Panic" (1986) |

"Bigmouth Strikes Again" is a 1986 song by the English rock band the Smiths from their third album The Queen Is Dead. Written by Johnny Marr and Morrissey, the song features self-deprecating lyrics that reflected Morrissey's frustrations with the music industry at the time. Musically, the song was inspired by the Rolling Stones' "Jumpin' Jack Flash" and centres around a guitar riff that Marr wrote during a 1985 soundcheck.

"Bigmouth Strikes Again" was released as the lead single from the album, bypassing Rough Trade's preferred choice, "There Is a Light That Never Goes Out". The single reached number 26 in the UK Singles Chart and has since seen critical acclaim along with several versions recorded by other artists.

== Background ==
"Bigmouth Strikes Again" began as a lyric written by Morrissey in the summer of 1985. The lyric was the final one of three written about Morrissey's frustration with the music industry, the previous two being "The Boy with the Thorn in His Side" and "Rubber Ring". "Bigmouth Strikes Again" specifically reflects Morrissey's negative experiences with the music press. When asked by the NME about the song, Morrissey replied, "I can't think of one sentence [I regret saying]. We're still at that stage where if I rescued a kitten from drowning, they'd say: 'Morrissey Mauls Kitten's Body'. So what can you do?"

Morrissey intended the lyrics of the song to be humorous; he explained, "I would call it a parody if that sounded less like self-celebration, which it definitely wasn't. It was just a really funny song". Drummer Mike Joyce commented, "What a fantastic title – one of Mozzer's better ones. And with this song, you can see why he made journalists cream their pants. Listen to the lyrical content. He was a one-off."

Johnny Marr based the song's music on a guitar riff he had written during a soundcheck of the band's 1985 tour. He described the song as being "as close as getting to the sound of my heroes as we came".

== Music and lyrics ==
During the song, the protagonist compares himself to Joan of Arc as "the flames rose to her Roman nose" and also says "now I know how Joan of Arc felt". In recent solo performances, Morrissey has changed the lyric "and her Walkman started to melt", to the more technologically current "and her iPod started to melt". Morrissey included the lyric "and her hearing aid started to melt" as a tribute to the band's deaf and hard-of-hearing fans.

Initially the band had asked Kirsty MacColl to contribute backing vocals, but Marr found her harmonies "really weird" and they were left off the final recording. Instead, the backing vocals were recorded by Morrissey and altered to a higher pitch. This is credited to "Ann Coates", a reference to the Manchester district of Ancoats.

== Release ==
Though "Bigmouth Strikes Again" was initially planned to be released as the debut single from The Queen Is Dead in autumn 1985, by spring 1986, Rough Trade head Geoff Travis pushed for the band to release "There Is a Light That Never Goes Out" instead.

"Bigmouth Strikes Again" was released as a single in May 1986, with the non-album instrumental song "Money Changes Everything" as the B-side. Marr later reused the music from "Money Changes Everything" for Bryan Ferry's 1987 hit single "The Right Stuff", which featured new lyrics from Ferry.

The single version's sleeve cover contains a photograph of James Dean by Nelva Jean Thomas. On the 12″ single, the band quoted Oscar Wilde's famous line "Talent borrows, genius steals" on the runout groove. The single reached number 26 in the UK.

A live version of the song appeared as the closing song on the band's only live album, Rank. Another live version, recorded at the Greek Theatre in Berkeley, California, in August 1986, was released in 2017 to promote a collector's edition of The Queen Is Dead.

== Reception ==
"Bigmouth Strikes Again" has seen critical acclaim since its release. Decades later critic Stephen Thomas Erlewine of AllMusic would praise the song's "minor-key rush," while Clash wrote that the song's "brash Stones-esque rock and sharp guitar lines still sound vital today."

Several publications have ranked the song as one of the band's best songs. Billboard ranked the song as the band's second best, while NME named it the band's fourth best. Paste called it the band's tenth best, while Louder included it in their unranked top ten, writing, "This could be their most iconic song." Rolling Stone ranked it as the Smiths' 13th best, writing, "'Bigmouth' was the funniest song they'd ever done – that drum break alone is a comic masterpiece." Consequence of Sound listed the song as the band's 19th best.

== Track listing ==
7" RT192
| No. | Title | Length |
|---|---|---|
| 1. | "Bigmouth Strikes Again" | 3:12 |
| 2. | "Money Changes Everything" | 4:40 |

12" RTT192
| No. | Title | Length |
|---|---|---|
| 1. | "Bigmouth Strikes Again" | 3:12 |
| 2. | "Money Changes Everything" | 4:40 |
| 3. | "Unloveable" | 3:54 |

== Charts ==
| Charts (1986) | Peak position |
|---|---|
| Belgium (Ultratop) | 38 |
| Netherlands (Dutch Top 40) | 26 |
| Netherlands (Single Top 100) | 32 |
| New Zealand (Recorded Music NZ) | 40 |
| UK Singles (The Official Charts Company) | 26 |
| UK Indie | 1 |

== Certifications ==
| Region | Certification | Certified units/sales |
|---|---|---|
| United Kingdom (BPI) Sales since 2005 | Platinum | 600,000^{‡} |
^{‡} Sales+streaming figures based on certification alone.

== Cover versions ==
=== Treepeople version ===
Seattle-based, Idaho indie rock/grunge band Treepeople covered "Bigmouth Strikes Again" on their 1992 double EP Something Vicious for Tomorrow/Time Whore, released by the independent Seattle label C/Z Records. The Treepeople version changes the second line of the first verse from "When I said by rights you should be bludgeoned in your bed" to "When I said I am gonna miss you when you're dead." This version was notable for having been recorded by Seattle grunge pioneer/producer Jack Endino of Skin Yard, who had previously worked with Mudhoney, Nirvana and Soundgarden, as well as having been mixed by Seattle producer Steve Fisk, known for his work with Nirvana, Screaming Trees, the Afghan Whigs and more.

=== Placebo version ===
The song was covered in 1996 by alternative band Placebo, who were asked by the French magazine Les Inrockuptibles to perform the song for the various artists compilation The Smiths Is Dead. This version changed the lyric "and her Walkman started to melt" to "and her Discman/Megadrive started to melt." Their rendition of the song also appeared as a B-side to "Nancy Boy", as well as on Disc 2 of the Sleeping with Ghosts special edition.

=== Slapshot version ===
The Boston based hardcore band Slapshot covered "Bigmouth Strikes Again" on their 1996 album 16 Valve Hate. The band's lead singer Jack Kelly was a fan of the Smiths growing up and made the decision for the band to do the cover while they were recording the album. The cover later appeared on the 1996, tribute album The World Still Won’t Listen: A Tribute to The Smiths. AllMusic described the cover as "a complete transformation of Morrissey's original song into a brutal but shockingly apt hardcore beatdown." In 2022, No Echo included the song on their list of 5 Killer The Smiths Cover Songs.
