= Kav Sandhu =

British musician

- Also known as: KAV, Kav Sandhu
- Born: Kavin Sandhu
- Origin: Leicester, England
- Genres: Indie rock
- Occupations: Musician, DJ and promoter
- Instruments: Guitar, vocals, bass
- Website: en-gb.facebook.com/kavmusic

Kavin Sandhu is a British musician from Leicester, England, now based in Los Angeles. Sandhu played guitar with British band Happy Mondays for four years after helping reform the band with frontman Shaun Ryder in 2004. He launched his solo project under moniker "KAV" in 2008 with long-time friend and drummer Jim (James) Portas. His solo material has been compared by the media to Iggy and the Stooges, Black Rebel Motorcycle Club, Primal Scream, Kasabian, the Rolling Stones and Bob Dylan. He uses a full band for live performances, which sometimes features guest musicians from various bands.

== Early career ==
Sandhu's first band, A.K.A Weave, toured the UK, playing at venues such as the London Astoria, Camden Underworld, and the Manchester Roadhouse. The band caught the eye of Oasis's ex-bassist Guigsy, who had recently parted with Oasis. This resulted in an opportunity to record at the Rockfield Studios in Monmouth, Wales with Guigsy, where the band recorded their debut album.

In 2000, Sandhu launched "Groove Harder" tours which A.K.A Weave played at featuring special guest DJs such as Shaun Ryder, Bez, Mani Gary Mounfield and other indie performers such as Rick Witter from Shed Seven DJing.

== Getloaded – Club events and festival ==
After the split of A.K.A Weave, Sandhu moved to London in 2003 and co-launched the club night Getloaded at London's Turnmills nightclub. This was the start of a partnership with Turnmills MD and House promoter Danny Newman. Over the next 18 months, Sandhu brought various musicians to Getloaded, including Factory Records boss Tony Wilson, Howard Marks (Mr Nice), Clint Boon (Inspiral Carpets/ XFM) Peter Hook (New Order/ Joy Division), Annie Mac (Radio 1), Steve Lamacq (Radio 1/ 6Music), Carl Barat (Libertines/ Dirty Pretty Things) Beta Band, Andy Rourke and Mike Joyce (The Smiths), The Farm, Client, and El Presidente.

Getloaded launched its inaugural summer festival in 2004. Ten thousand revellers attended the festival held on Clapham Common. It would go on to become one of the biggest indie festivals in London, and one of the early challengers to the mainstream UK festivals. "Getloaded in The Park 2004" was awarded "Best New Festival" at the UK Festival Awards 2004. Kav parted with Getloaded in 2006.

== Happy Mondays ==
The headliner for Getloaded in the Park 2004 was Happy Mondays, their first live gig in nearly five years. Shaun Ryder had toured with A.K.A Weave as a DJ, and recruited Sandhu to join the Happy Mondays on guitar, handing him the task of recruiting new band members to fit alongside original members Gary Whelan and Mark Berry ("Bez"). Sandhu completed the new line-up of the Happy Mondays, along with ex A.K.A Weave band member Mikey Shine and San Diego-born slide guitar player Jonn Dunn. After their successful appearance at "Getloaded in the Park 2004", the Mondays continued touring live across the UK & Europe and decided to record a new album.

The Hollywood producers for British football film Goal! asked the Happy Mondays to write the title track for their film. Sandhu co-wrote the track "Playground Superstar" with Shaun Ryder, Gaz Whelan and producer Dave Parkinson. The track was released on Big Brother Records surrounding the film release. Following this, Happy Mondays commenced work on their new studio album.

Happy Mondays continued to tour the world, including appearances at Fuji Rock 2006 and 2007, Coachella Festival, Roskilde Festival, Summercase Madrid and Barcelona, Global Gathering, Getloaded festivals, MEN Arena, Brixton Academy and V Festival.

Sandhu spent his spare time playing DJ gigs worldwide, including Japan, Mexico, South America, Europe. He played on the same line-up as Guns N' Roses and Bob Dylan and toured Australia on the same line-up as James Brown as part of Good Vibrations Festival.

In mid 2005, Sandhu started a new indie/electro project called Sonic Audio. The band released a white label 12" Killing Yourself on London indie label Puregroove Records. Sonic Audio went on a small UK tour, playing a show with guest Shaun Ryder at Glastonbury Festival on the Leftfield stage with The Rakes and British Sea Power. Sonic Audio also played Alan McGee's Pop Tones stage as a late replacement for the Libertines's former guitarist Carl Barât.

In 2006, Happy Mondays recorded their fifth album, Uncle Dysfunktional, after a gap of over ten years. Sandhu played guitar, sang vocals and co-wrote the music. The album was released on Sanctuary Records in 2007. Sandhu played his last show with the Mondays at V Festival 2007, leaving to pursue his solo project.

== KAV (solo project) ==
In January 2008 Kav Sandhu announced his new solo project titled KAV.

On 21 April 2008, he released his début EP Blaggers N' Liars. It received good reviews in the press, including The Guardian, which described Sandhu as a "Latter Day Jagger". The Sun rated the EP four out of five.

The music was compared to bands like Black Rebel Motorcycle Club, Primal Scream, the Rolling Stones and Led Zeppelin by The Guardian and other publications.

== Los Angeles ==
After recording several album tracks in London at Fortress Studios, KAV moved to Los Angeles in 2008 to work with producer and Eastern Conference Champions front man Josh Ostrander.

He began recording his debut album in Los Angeles, meanwhile playing live at local venues; Spaceland, The Viper Room, Whisky a Go Go, The Silverlake Lounge & the Key Club, testing the new material on US Audiences. Sandhu also DJed Cinespace as part of Dim Mak Records night and The Standard Hotel Hollywood. Back in the UK the band performed at The Aftershow in Manchester with The Music, London club night This Feeling & venues Punk, The 100 Club and Proud Galleries.

In August 2007, Kav guested with Norwegian dance-rockers Datarock at festivals in Reading and Leeds, along with some London shows.

He spent the majority of 2008 to 2011 in Los Angeles, touring the US and on a tour with DATAROCK & Esser, including dates at The El Rey Theatre, SXSW 2010 & CMJ Music Marathon.

In October 2010, KAV released The Mr Nice EP featuring Howard Marks (AKA Mr Nice), touring the UK with to promote the release.

In 2009 his track "Easy" was featured in Netflix documentary Naked Ambition. The sound track for the movie was chosen by Nic Harcourt. In 2011, his music was featured in the soundtrack for a short film, To Live & Ride in LA. His track "City of Sun" was also used by AMC across North America in May 2012 for their Spring Trailer.

In 2011, KAV's album was remixed by Josh Ostrander and mastered by Stephen Marcussen. He also recorded a live album at Bedrock Studios, Echo Park, mixed by Nick Tipp.

His first single "Blaggers N' Liars 2012" was released on 26 March 2012, followed by a UK tour.

Gibson Guitar Studios showcased KAV in London on 16 February 2012. In mid 2012, KAV headlined Club NME at KOKO and supported Kasabian at the Brixton Academy London, with Band of Skulls. He also played BT London Live as part of the London Olympics celebrations in Hyde Park and Victoria Park, and played headline shows at King Tuts Glasgow, Death Disco and a headline show at Camden barfly

In October 2012, KAV supported Liverpool band the Farm as part of their 20th Anniversary London Show with special guests Mick Jones and John Power. His single "King of the World (The Undefeated Champion)" was released on Suburban Records on 29 October, featuring Pro MMA Fighters in the video.

In March 2013, Shameless used KAV's track "Blaggers N' Liars" for their new series on Showtime. KAV spent the rest of 2013 recording an album project with Rick Genest aka 'Zombie Boy'. Zombie Boy featured on KAV's single "Dirty Rejects", released on 21 May 2013. He went on to tour with Zombie Boy throughout 2012 & 2013.

KAV released his single "Dance In A Panic" in May 2014. The single was picked for a movie teaser for feature film Decoding Annie Parker and saw Aaron Paul (Breaking Bad) dancing to the track as part of a movie teaser. In May 2014, KAV was joined on stage by Oasis founding member Paul "Bonehead" Arthurs at The Viper Room, Los Angeles.

KAV's debut album, The Man With No Shadow was released on 29 August 2014 on Wild Echo Records. His album debuted at #20 on the CMJ 'Most Added' chart in its first week and was in the Top 30 Chart on 22 US College Stations including KXLU, KFSR, KVMR & KLSU, while also securing airplay at influential stations like KUMD, WKNC, WRUV & WUNH. Stryker from KROQ named "Blaggers N' Liars" as his "favorite '4.20' of the year" in December 2014.

In 2016, KAV recorded the end credits for a movie starring John Malkovich and Rhys Iffans, directed by Steven Bernstein. The movie was due to be released in 2017.

== Dance in a Panic ==
In March 2016, he launched his LA-based, 'British-style rock n' roll' dance parties, "Dance in a Panic", at the 1200 capacity Regent Theater in DTLA, in conjunction with established local promoters Spaceland. The launch event was curated by Peter Hook (Joy Division/ New Order). Dance In A Panic also organized a Coachella kick-off party at The Hard Rock Hotel, Palm Springs, in April with partners Jack Daniels.

The April event in Los Angeles saw live performances from Deap Vally & Le Butcherettes with Andy Rourke from the Smiths DJing, with official sponsor partners Britweek and Norwegian Air and Lagunitas. The event has had notable attendees including John Frusciante, Nick Zinner, Anna Faris and Alexandra Holden.

== Blitz Vega ==
In April 2019 KAV launched new band Blitz Vega with Andy Rourke from the Smiths.
