= Blitz Vega =

American musical group

Blitz Vega are a Rock band based between New York City and Los Angeles featuring Andy Rourke bassist of The Smiths alongside frontman and guitarist Kav Sandhu of the Happy Mondays.

== History ==
Blitz Vega was formed by Sandhu and Rourke in Los Angeles on Christmas Day 2017.

The band debuted their first single "Hey Christo" on April 16, 2019. It was described as 'a rager that springs from the Primal Scream/Kasabian/Black Rebel Motorcycle Club family tree' by Buzz Bands LA.

In April 2019 they recorded a live EP at Abbey Road Studios and featured on Red Stripe Presents: This Feeling TV presented by Laura Whitmore and Gordon Smart.

The band played their debut live show on July 24, 2019, at The House Of Machines in L.A.'s Arts District. They followed up with the release of their second single "Lost & Found" on September 20, 2019, and a single for Halloween on October 30, 2019, "LA Vampire".

The band released the single "Strong Forever" on November 17, 2022. This song not only featured the band members, but their guest guitarist was Johnny Marr, the guitarist of The Smiths, with the first reunion of any ex-members of The Smiths. The release of this new single brought with it a Rolling Stones Magazine publication of a new article on the band.

Throughout the band's existence, Rourke had been privately battling pancreatic cancer.

In April 2023, approximately three weeks before his death, Rourke asked Sandhu to promise that he would complete their debut album and tour the music.

Rourke died on May 19, 2023.

Following Rourke's death, Sandhu worked with engineer Will Kennedy to finalise the production of the album based on notes and track listings Rourke had approved.

The band's debut album, Northern Gentleman, was released on September 27, 2024.

It features 10 tracks selected by Rourke from the 17 songs the band had recorded over an eight-year period.

The band released a subsequent single, "Superbrain", on August 20, 2025.

Sandhu has stated that a documentary covering the band's seven-year recording history is also in production.

== Band Members ==
- Andy Rourke, Bassist
- Kav Sandhu, Guitarist and Main Vocalist
- Craig Eriksson, Drummer
- Greg Gent, Guitarist and Backing Vocals
- Asa Brown, Keyboardist and Backing Vocals
- Tom Arizmendi, Guitarist and Backing Vocals

== Live Performances ==
To date, the band's appearance at The House Of Machines in L.A.'s Arts District stands as their sole live performance with Rourke.

All subsequent tour dates were put on indefinite hold due to Andy Rourke's struggle with pancreatic cancer.

Since Rourke's passing, the band has played a number of live locations as of February 2025, such as La Scala in London.

== Discography ==
Title	Type	Release Date
"Hey Christo"	Single	April 16, 2019
"Lost & Found"	Single	September 20, 2019
"LA Vampire"	Single	October 30, 2019
"Strong Forever"	Single	November 17, 2022
"Disconnected"	Single	March 8, 2024
"Northern Gentleman"	Album	September 27, 2024
"Superbrain"	Single	August 20, 2025

== Social Media ==
The band can be found on most social media platforms:

- Instagram: @blitzvega
- Facebook: BlitzVegamusic
- Twitter: @BlitzVegamusic
