= Science Agrees =

Studio album by D.A.R.K.
- Released: September 9, 2016
- Label: Cooking Vinyl

Professional ratings
Aggregate scores
Source	Rating
Metacritic	55/100
Review scores
Source	Rating
AllMusic	3/5 stars
Pitchfork	6.2/10

Science Agrees is the only studio album by American-English-Irish band D.A.R.K. It was released on September 9, 2016 through Cooking Vinyl.

The band featured New York City-based DJ Olé Koretsky, Irish vocalist Dolores O'Riordan (of The Cranberries), and English bassist Andy Rourke (of The Smiths).

This was one of O'Riordan's final projects released prior to her death in 2018.

== Critical reception ==
Science Agrees was met with mixed or average reviews from critics. At Metacritic, which assigns a weighted average rating out of 100 to reviews from mainstream publications, this release received an average score of 55, based on 5 reviews.

== Track listing ==
No.	Title	Length
1.	"Curvy"	5:28
2.	"Chynamite"	3:37
3.	"Gunfight"	3:17
4.	"Steal You Away"	4:39
5.	"High Fashion"	4:06
6.	"Watch Out"	4:33
7.	"Miles Away"	4:09
8.	"The Moon"	4:36
9.	"Underwater"	4:16
10.	"Loosen the Noose"	4:24
