= Andy Rourke =

English musician (1964–2023)

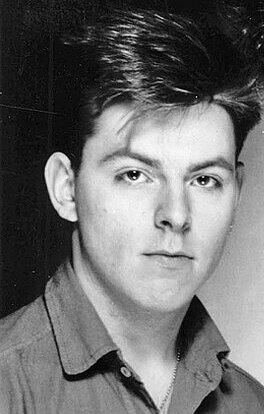
- Rourke in 1984

Background information
- Born: Andrew Michael Rourke; 17 January 1964; Manchester, England
- Died: 19 May 2023 (aged 59) New York City, U.S.
- Genres: Alternative rock; indie pop
- Occupation: Musician
- Instruments: Bass guitar; guitar; cello
- Labels: 24 Hour Service Station; Rough Trade
- Formerly of: Freak Party; The Smiths; Freebass; D.A.R.K.; Blitz Vega; The Pretenders
- Spouse: Francesca Mor (m. 2012)
- Website: Official website

Andrew Michael Rourke (17 January 1964 – 19 May 2023) was an English musician best known as the bassist of the 1980s indie rock band the Smiths. Regarded as one of the greatest bassists of his generation, he was known for his melodic and funk-inspired approach to bass playing.

Rourke joined the Smiths after their first gig, having known guitarist Johnny Marr since secondary school, and played on their entire discography. After the group broke up in 1987, he performed on some of lead vocalist Morrissey's early solo releases. Rourke recorded with Sinéad O'Connor and the Pretenders in the early 1990s, and was a member of the supergroup Freebass and the band D.A.R.K., and later Blitz Vega with Kav Sandhu. He organised the Versus Cancer concerts from 2006 to 2009.

== Early life ==
Rourke was born in Manchester, then part of Lancashire, in 1964, and grew up on the Racecourse Estate in Ashton upon Mersey. His Irish father, Michael, worked as an architect; his mother, Mary (née Stone), was English. He was raised by his father in Ashton-upon-Mersey, and later Sharston, after his mother separated from him and left the family home.

He received an acoustic guitar from his parents when he was seven years old. At the age of 11, he befriended a young John Maher (soon to be Johnny Marr) with whom he shared an interest in music: both attended St Augustine's Grammar School in Sharston. The pair spent lunch breaks in school jamming and playing on their guitars. When Marr and Rourke formed a band, Rourke switched to bass, which he fell in love with and continued to play for the rest of his career.

Rourke left school when he was 15 and passed through a series of menial jobs, playing guitar and bass in various rock bands, as well as in the short-lived funk band Freak Party, with Marr.

== Career ==
=== The Smiths ===
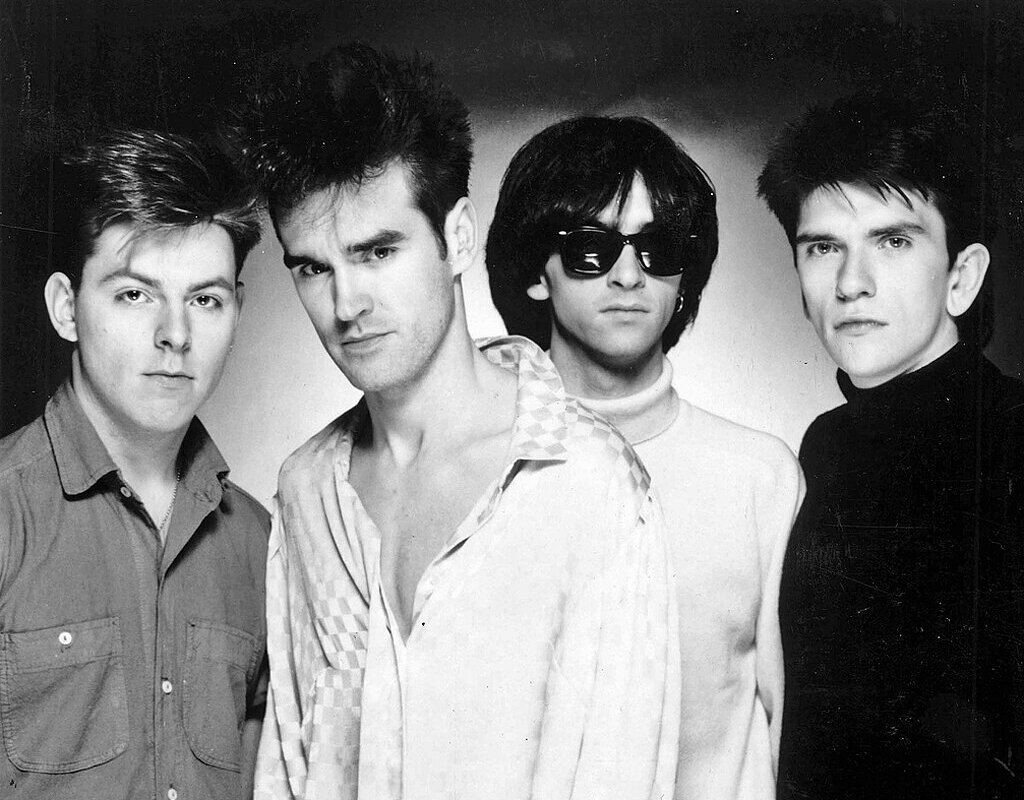
Rourke (furthest left) with the Smiths in 1984

Marr later teamed up with Morrissey to form the Smiths. Rourke joined the band after its first gig in 1982, when Marr fired original bass player Dale Hibbert, and remained through the rest of its existence. The band's second studio album, Meat Is Murder, featured the track "Barbarism Begins at Home", a seven-minute funk-inspired track regarded by several critics as one of Rourke's greatest contributions. He was also praised for rockabilly-inspired basslines on the tracks "Rusholme Ruffians" and "Nowhere Fast". Some of Rourke's other noted performances include "This Charming Man" and "How Soon Is Now?".

Rourke used heroin for twenty years from the age of 16. He was arrested for drug possession and sacked from the band in early 1986, via a handwritten note left on his car windscreen by Morrissey. Experienced session musician Guy Pratt was brought in as a replacement and found Rourke's compositions difficult to learn; he was relieved when Rourke was restored two weeks later, having been cleared to tour the United States. Just after Rourke's reinstatement, the Smiths released their third studio album, The Queen Is Dead. In his absence, second guitarist Craig Gannon joined the band. Marr described Rourke's contribution to that album as "something no other bass player could match", and the heavy bassline on the title track as one of the best he had heard. Rourke played cello on several Smiths tracks, including "Shakespeare's Sister", "Rubber Ring", "Oscillate Wildly" and the Troy Tate version of "Pretty Girls Make Graves". The Smiths released their fourth and final studio album Strangeways, Here We Come, in 1987 to critical acclaim, and broke up soon after.

Rourke and drummer Mike Joyce started legal proceedings against Morrissey and Marr over royalties. Rourke, who had financial issues due to his heroin use, settled out of court in 1989 for £83,000 and 10% of future royalties while relinquishing all further claims; Joyce pursued the claim until 1996 and was awarded substantially more in court. Rourke filed for bankruptcy in 1999.

=== Post-Smiths ===
==== 1990s ====
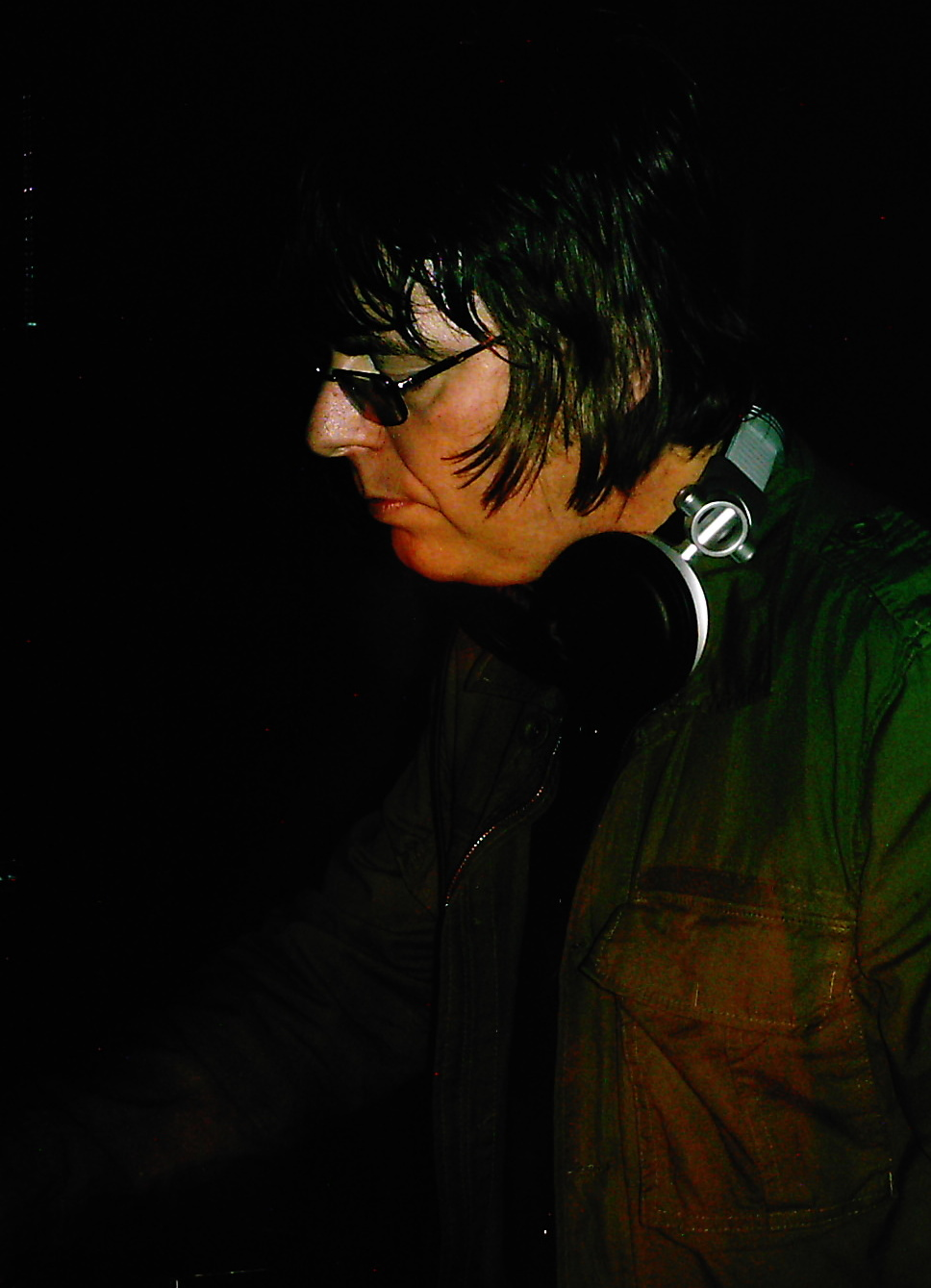
Rourke in 1994

Soon after the break-up of the Smiths, Rourke and Joyce played with Sinéad O'Connor. Rourke appears on her second studio album I Do Not Want What I Haven't Got (1990). With Craig Gannon, he provided the rhythm section for two singles by Smiths vocalist Morrissey – "Interesting Drug" and "The Last of the Famous International Playboys" (both 1989). Rourke also played bass guitar on Morrissey's "November Spawned a Monster" and "Piccadilly Palare" (both 1990) and composed the music for Morrissey's songs "Yes, I Am Blind" (the B-side of "Ouija Board, Ouija Board", 1989); "Girl Least Likely To" (a B-side on the 12-inch single of "November Spawned a Monster"; also released as a bonus track on the 1997 reissue of Viva Hate); and "Get Off the Stage" (the B-side of "Piccadilly Palare").

In 1994, he worked as a session bassist with the Pretenders, appearing on six tracks on Last of the Independents, as well as working with Killing Joke, Badly Drawn Boy (with whom Rourke toured for two years), Aziz Ibrahim (formerly of the Stone Roses) and ex-Oasis guitarist Paul "Bonehead" Arthurs as Moondog One, which also included former Smiths members Joyce and Gannon. Rourke also played bass guitar for Ian Brown, both on tour and on Brown's fifth solo studio album, The World Is Yours (2007).

==== 2000s ====
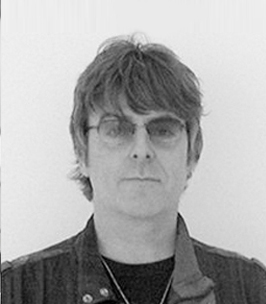
Rourke in 2005

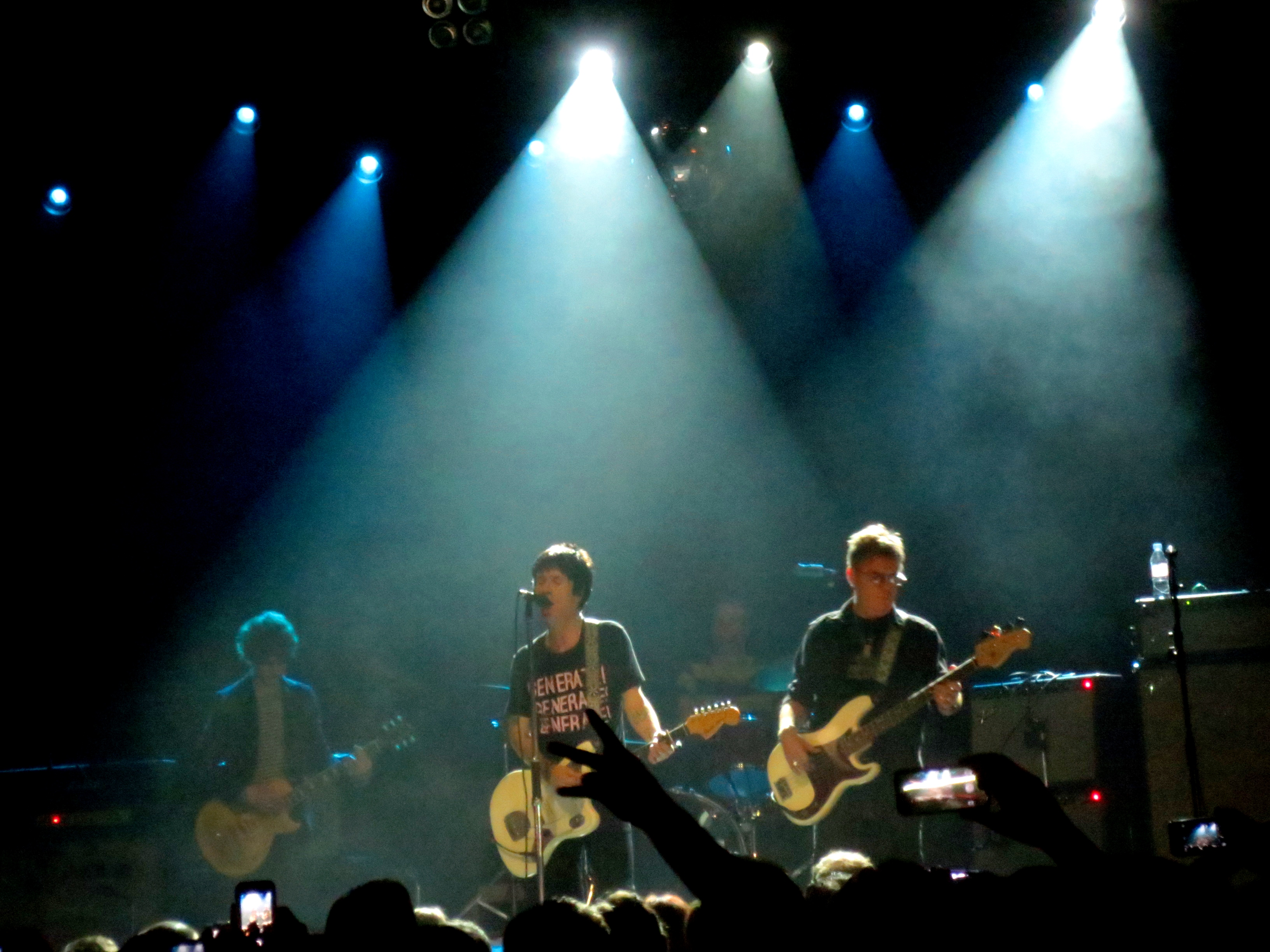
Rourke (right) performing with Johnny Marr in 2013

Rourke formed Freebass with bassists Mani (ex-Stone Roses) and Peter Hook (ex-New Order) in 2007 and remained active in the group until August 2010. Early in 2009, he moved to New York City, where he had a programme on East Village Radio and worked as a club DJ with Olé Koretsky under the name Jetlag. This led to Rourke and Koretsky forming the alternative rock band D.A.R.K. with Dolores O'Riordan, lead vocalist with the Cranberries. The trio released their debut studio album, Science Agrees, in 2016 through the independent label Cooking Vinyl.

In 2016, Rourke appeared on the cover of Bass Guitar.

In January 2018, it was announced that Rourke, Joyce and Gannon would take part in Classically Smiths, a series of classical music concerts based on the Smiths' discography, with the Manchester Camerata. Rourke released a statement, saying that he had never agreed to take part in the event; Joyce and Gannon subsequently withdrew and the events were cancelled.

After the death of O'Riordan, Rourke formed Blitz Vega with guitarist and vocalist Kav Sandhu, formerly of Happy Mondays. Their first single, "Hey Christo", was released in 2019.

Also in 2019, Blitz Vega recorded a live EP at Abbey Road Studios and featured on Red Stripe Presents: This Feeling TV presented by Laura Whitmore and Gordon Smart. In 2022, Blitz Vega released the single "Strong Forever", featuring Johnny Marr as their guest guitarist.

== Personal life ==
Rourke moved to New York City in early 2009, where he remained until his death. In 2012, he married Francesca Mor.

=== Versus Cancer ===
Rourke, his then-manager Nova Rehman, his production company, Great Northern Productions, and others organised Manchester v Cancer, a series of concerts to benefit cancer research, later known simply as Versus Cancer. The initiative was prompted when Rehman's father and sister were diagnosed with the disease. The first Manchester v Cancer concert took place in January 2006. It featured a reunion between Rourke and his former Smiths bandmate Johnny Marr, who performed one song together. He organised further concerts in the three following years.

== Death ==
On the morning of 19 May 2023, Rourke died from a "lengthy" battle with pancreatic cancer at Memorial Sloan Kettering Cancer Center in New York City. He was 59.

All three of Rourke's former Smiths bandmates paid tribute to him, with Morrissey writing: "He didn't ever know his own power, and nothing that he played had been played by someone else. His distinction was so terrific and unconventional and he proved it could be done...I suppose, at the end of it all, we hope to feel that we were valued. Andy need not worry about that." Johnny Marr described Rourke as a "beautiful soul by those who knew him and as a supremely gifted musician by music fans"; additionally, speaking on the early days of their friendship, he said: "We were best friends, going everywhere together [...] When we were fifteen I moved into his house with him and his three brothers and I soon came to realise that my mate was one of those rare people that absolutely no one doesn't like."

=== Mural ===
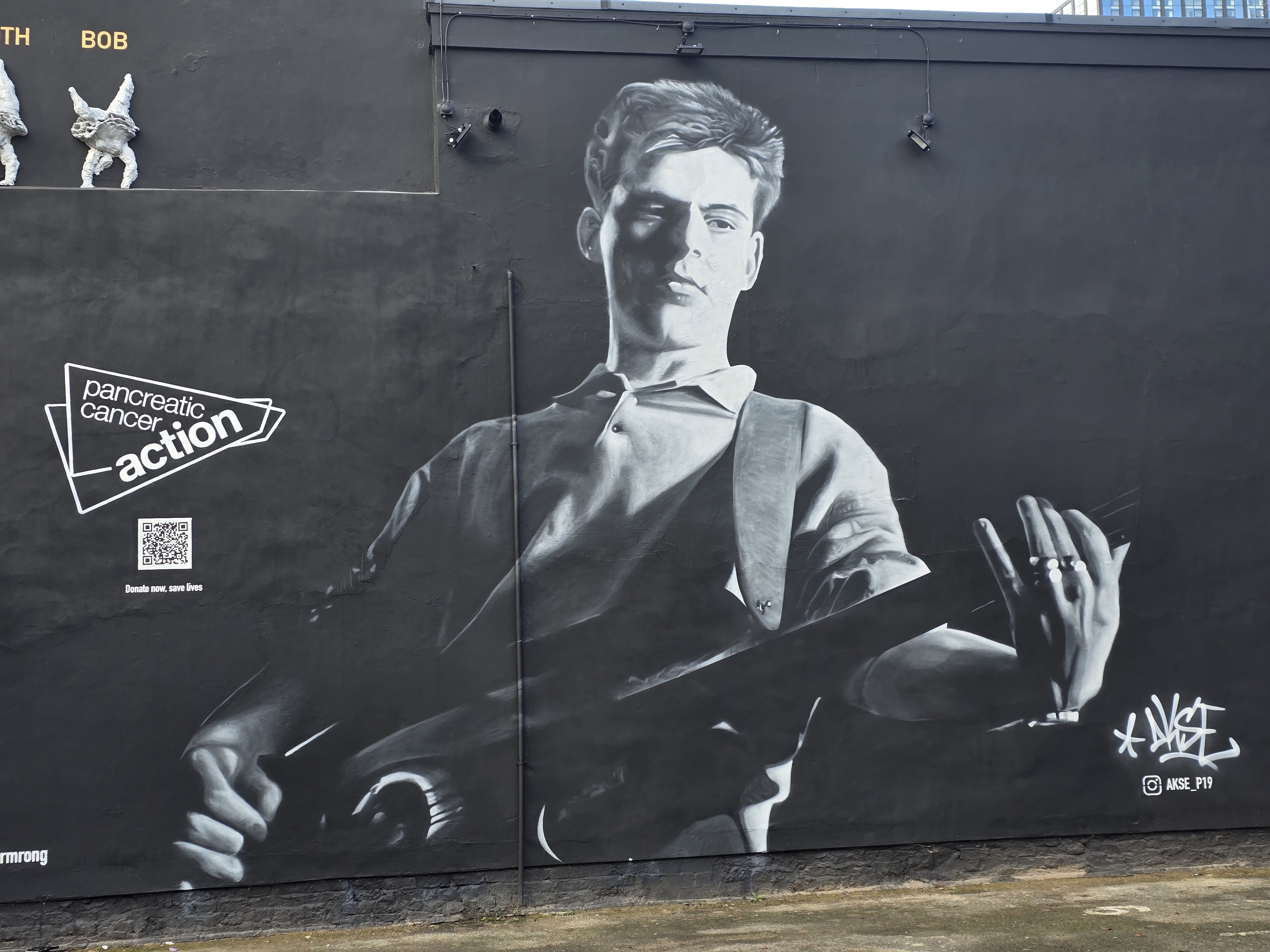
Photograph of the memorial mural

On 21 November 2024, a mural depicting Rourke was unveiled at The Wheatsheaf pub in Manchester's Northern Quarter. The mural was painted by Akse P19, a Manchester-based street artist. In attendance at the event were Mike Joyce, Nalinee Darmrong (the photographer whose image the work was based on) and Joe Kirwin from Pancreatic Cancer Action.

== Equipment ==
Rourke played a Fender Precision Bass, a Fender Jazz Bass, a Yamaha BB3000 bass and others.

== Discography ==
=== Morrissey ===
Singles

- "Piccadilly Palare"
- "Interesting Drug"
- "November Spawned a Monster"
- "The Last of the Famous International Playboys"

Albums

- Bona Drag (1990)

=== Freebass ===
Singles

- "Live Tomorrow You Go Down" – 2010 – 24 Hour Service Station

EPs

- Two Worlds Collide – 2010 – 24 Hour Service Station
- You Don't Know This About Me (The Arthur Baker Remixes) – 2010 – 24 Hour Service Station
- Fritz von Runte vs Freebass Redesign – 2010 – 24 Hour Service Station
- Two Worlds Collide (The Instrumental Mixes) – 2010 – 24 Hour Service Station

Albums

- It's a Beautiful Life – 2010 – 24 Hour Service Station / Essential

=== D.A.R.K. ===
- Science Agrees (2016)

=== Sinéad O'Connor ===
Albums

- I Do Not Want What I Haven't Got (1990)

Singles

- "The Emperor's New Clothes" (1990)

=== The Pretenders ===
Albums

- Last of the Independents (1994)

Singles

- "Night in My Veins" (1994)
- "997" (1994)
- "Money Talk" (1994)

=== Ian Brown ===
- The World Is Yours (2007)

=== Blitz Vega ===
- "Hey Christo" (2019)
- "Lost & Found" (2019)
- "LA Vampire" (2019)
- "Strong Vampire" (2022)
