= Barbarism Begins at Home =

Single by the Smiths

from the album Meat Is Murder
- Released: January 1985
- Genre: Indie rock; funk rock; post-punk
- Length: 3:48 (7" version); 6:57 (album version)
- Label: Rough Trade
- Composer: Johnny Marr
- Lyricist: Morrissey
- Producer: The Smiths

The Smiths singles chronology
"How Soon Is Now?" (1984)	"Barbarism Begins at Home" (1985)	"Shakespeare's Sister" (1985)

Official audio
- "Barbarism Begins at Home" on YouTube

"Barbarism Begins at Home" is a song by the English rock band the Smiths. Featured on their second studio album, Meat Is Murder (1985), the song has a lyric condemning child abuse and a funk-inspired track based around Andy Rourke's bass line.

"Barbarism Begins at Home" was given an initial limited release in Germany and Italy in April 1985 but was not released as a single in the UK until 1988. It has since seen positive critical reception and became a live favourite during the band's lifetime.

== Background ==
"Barbarism Begins at Home" was co-written by lead vocalist Morrissey and guitarist Johnny Marr at the band's rehearsal room in Manchester. When first introduced by the band, the song was titled "Fascism Begins at Home." Lyrically, the song was an ardent criticism of corporal punishment and child abuse. Morrissey commented in a Melody Maker interview in March 1985, "From the time you get hit when you're a child, violence is the only answer. Conversation is pointless."

Musically, the song is a funk-influenced track built around Andy Rourke's repetitive bassline and Marr's Chic-influenced guitar riffing. The song was a callback to Marr and Rourke's pre-Smiths time in the instrumental group Freak Party, which also featured Simon Wolstencroft, future drummer of the Fall. Of the song's bass line, Marr commented, "Andy is, quite rightly, proud of that bass line." Drummer Mike Joyce concurred, "The bass line's a killer. It's interesting to see how Morrissey got his head around it. We'd be playing and when we'd stop Andy would often continue with a Stanley Clarke bass line. It's incredible the way he can shift into that." On the whole, however, Marr stated that he "didn't think [the song] really represented the band" and felt that the track was "a little bit corny".

== Release ==
In addition to its release on Meat Is Murder, "Barbarism Begins at Home" was released as a single in Germany and Italy. Though the band considered releasing the song as a single in the UK, it initially only saw a limited release to DJs as a promotional single there. A 1988 single for the song was released in the UK after the band's break-up.

The single artwork featured Viv Nicholson, a British tabloid figure who had previously appeared on the single cover for "Heaven Knows I'm Miserable Now".

== Critical reception ==
"Barbarism Begins at Home" has generally seen positive critical reception since its release. The Guardian described the song as "brilliantly titled," while Pitchfork wrote that extended song length "works remarkably well for 'Barbarism Begins at Home', seven minutes of tense funk".

Consequence ranked the song as the 14th best Smiths song, writing, "The Smiths' sound was largely concrete by 1985, but Rourke's funk-influenced bass line and Marr's rockabilly guitar on 'Barbarism Begins at Home' introduced a new sense of exploration into their music. Add Morrissey's distinctive yelps to the mix, and it's easy to see why 'Barbarism Begins at Home' remains one of the group's most influential mid-career tracks." Guitar named the song as the band's 11th greatest guitar moment, commenting, "'Barbarism...' is a potent, punchy workout that proves the faultless musical dynamic the three had, and also indicates the sheer versatility the then 21 year old guitarist could turn his hand to. Running beyond seven minutes, 'Barbarism...' certainly stands well apart from The Smiths' tightly constructed chart-botherers, and – despite Morrissey's best intentions, penning a lyric that studied the effects of domestic child abuse – it's a remarkably fun, smile-inducing listen".

== Live history ==
"Barbarism Begins at Home" was first performed live in December 1983 at a concert at Trinity College Dublin, nearly a year before they recorded it for Meat Is Murder. This first version was about seventeen minutes long; drummer Mike Joyce recalled:

Mozzer had been knocking the red wine back and we got out there and it was about seventeen minutes long. Moz kept going into that middle bit—yodeling. Fuckin' on and on. Johnny [Marr] kept coming over and looking at me, and every time he did it I thought, 'Thank God, he's going to stop it.' We were knackered.

The song became a live favourite for the band, being appearing as a set-opener and alternatively as an encore and often extending to long vamps. It was performed live on the British music television programme The Tube in March 1984. At a concert at the Royal Albert Hall in April 1985, the band performed the song with Dead or Alive's Pete Burns, who duetted with Morrissey on lead vocals. During one of these jams, Morrissey ad-libbed the lyrics "the queen is dead," which would later appear in the band's 1986 song "The Queen Is Dead" and as the title of the studio album of the same name.

== Track listing ==
7" RTD 021 (Germany)
No.	Title	Length
1.	"Barbarism Begins at Home (Single edit)"	3:48
2.	"Shakespeare's Sister"	2:09

12" RTD 021 T (Germany)
No.	Title	Length
1.	"Barbarism Begins at Home"	7:00
2.	"Shakespeare's Sister"	2:09
3.	"Stretch Out and Wait"	2:37

CD Single RTT171CD (UK 1988)
No.	Title	Length
1.	"Barbarism Begins at Home (Single edit)"	3:48
2.	"Shakespeare's Sister"	2:09
3.	"Stretch Out and Wait"	2:37
