= That Joke Isn't Funny Anymore =

Single by the Smiths

from the album Meat Is Murder
- Released: 5 July 1985
- Recorded: 1984
- Length: 3:49 (7-inch single); 4:59 (album version)
- Label: Rough Trade
- Composer: Johnny Marr
- Lyricist: Morrissey
- Producer: The Smiths

The Smiths singles chronology
"Shakespeare's Sister" (1985)	"That Joke Isn't Funny Anymore" (1985)	"The Headmaster Ritual" (1985)

"That Joke Isn't Funny Anymore" is a song by the English rock band the Smiths. The full-length version of the song appears on the album Meat Is Murder. It was the sole track from the album to be released, in edited form, as a UK single. The song was written by guitarist Johnny Marr and singer Morrissey. Marr has cited it as one of his favourite Smiths songs.

== Music and lyrics ==
The song's narrative refers to mockery of the lonely or suicidal, whom the narrator identifies with and champions in an exchange with another individual in a parked car. Disparity between literal and figurative meanings in parts of the lyric discourage a precise reading of the song. In 1985, Morrissey disclosed to Melody Maker that the song was a response to journalistic mockery of his songwriting that dwelt "on the unhappy side of life" and to persistent attempts to expose him as a "fake". In 1998, Uncut reported rumours that the song's inspiration was an "'intimate friendship' with a journalist around 1984–5".

The song's waltz-time-related signature and Marr's rhythm guitar, with strident chord changes (as exemplified by the song's opening figure), lend the music a sweeping emotive feel. The song's structure is notable for its uncommon ABCBC form. Musically, the first verse is never repeated. According to Marr, the song's musical composition "just fell through the roof. It was one of those times when the feeling just falls down on you from the ceiling somewhere and it almost plays itself."

== Reception ==
For many critics the song is the focal point of Meat Is Murder. The music has been described as "a monolithic ballad of tender yet imposing grace; a score of unreserved, raw beauty that Morrissey dutifully complemented", and the song's coda as containing "one of the most heart-rending vocal passages Morrissey has ever recorded".

The single entered and peaked in the UK Singles Chart at No. 49. The unusual timing of the release may have had an impact on its modest chart position: two non-LP tracks, "How Soon Is Now?" and "Shakespeare's Sister", had already been released as singles since Meat Is Murder had come out, and both featured tracks from the album on their B-sides. Rough Trade owner Geoff Travis has said the single was released on Morrissey's insistence: "I said to him 'that's not a good idea' ...and he wouldn't have that and, being me, I said 'fine ...'" Other reasons for its relative lack of commercial success include the absence of new studio material on the B-side, and perceived fan displeasure at the 7" version missing the instrumental coda; it was described by Jack Rabid of AllMusic as the first of the band's singles that "wasn't a complete thrill to buy". Additionally, the single suffered overall inadequate promotion, and potential exposure was lessened by the band cancelling a planned performance on the UK television show Wogan, due to Morrissey not wanting to appear on the programme.

== Track listing ==
7" RT186
No.	Title	Length
1.	"That Joke Isn't Funny Anymore" (edit)	3:49
2.	"Meat Is Murder" (live)	5:34

12-inch RTT186
No.	Title	Length
1.	"That Joke Isn't Funny Anymore"	4:57
2.	"Nowhere Fast" (live)	2:31
3.	"Stretch Out and Wait" (live)	2:49
4.	"Shakespeare's Sister" (live)	2:12
5.	"Meat Is Murder" (live)	5:34

Live tracks recorded at the Apollo, Oxford, on 18 March 1985.

== Artwork and matrix message ==
The artwork for the single is taken from a still of the 1964 Soviet film The Enchanted Desna. It features a child actor, the uncropped original having also featured the child's on-screen mother. According to Morrissey, "The eyes are encrusted with hurt and premature wisdom". The image was sourced from a 1965 issue of a specialist film magazine. A rejected sleeve design included an image of a dead chicken.

The seven and 12-inch vinyl releases feature the matrix message "OUR SOULS OUR SOULS OUR SOULS" (7-inch A-side and B-side and 12-inch A-side). The Canadian 12-inch A-side features the message "HELEN WHEELS".

== Charts ==
Chart (1985)	Peak position
Ireland (IRMA)	20
UK Singles (The Official Charts Company)	49
UK Indie	1
