= The Headmaster Ritual =

Single by the Smiths

from the album Meat Is Murder
- Released: July 1985
- Genre: Indie rock; alternative rock
- Length: 4:52
- Label: Rough Trade
- Songwriters: Morrissey; Johnny Marr
- Producer: The Smiths

The Smiths singles chronology
"That Joke Isn't Funny Anymore" (1985)	"The Headmaster Ritual" (1985)	"The Boy with the Thorn in His Side" (1985)

Alternative cover
- UK, Australia and New Zealand release

"The Headmaster Ritual" is a song by the English rock band the Smiths that appeared as the first song on their second studio album, Meat Is Murder. It was released as a single in the Netherlands in July 1985 and subsequently released as a CD single in the UK in 1988 and Australia/New Zealand in 1990. The music was written by Johnny Marr and the lyrics by Morrissey.

Written as a critique of British education and corporal punishment, "The Headmaster Ritual" features a jangling guitar line with inspirations as diverse as the Beatles, Joni Mitchell, and MC5. The song attracted attention and controversy in the UK for its lyrics. The song has drawn critical acclaim for Morrissey's vocals and lyricism as well as for Marr's guitar.

== Background ==
"The Headmaster Ritual" was written as a criticism of the English education system, citing the 'belligerent ghouls' who ran Manchester schools. The song was the only one in which Marr made a suggestion to Morrissey on the lyrics, specifically to change the line 'bruises bigger than dinner plates' to 'bruises big as dinner plates'. As Marr recounted, "An eyebrow was very definitely raised at this point, and he went away to mull it over. When we reconvened 24 hours later, he said he'd given it a lot of thought and was impressed by my observation. Then, of course, he went on to do sod-all about it!"

Marr wrote the track while in open E tuning, recalling, "I had no idea what I was doing when I wrote it, and I quite like that. I think it's a handy device for cutting out the brain static that gets in the way of coming up with chord changes." Musically, the song opens with an open-tuned chord that Marr has described it as what Joni Mitchell "would have done had she been an MC5 fan." Most of the song's guitar parts, according to Marr, were played on a Rickenbacker: "'The Headmaster Ritual' main riff is two tracks of Rickenbacker. I wasn't specifically thinking of the Beatles' 'Day Tripper' (even though it sounds like it) but I did think of it as a George Harrison part." Marr noted that the song took "about three years" to write, the longest it took him to write any song.

Morrissey has described the song as "a live-wire spitfire guitar sound that takes on all-comers." He would sing the song in some of his solo tours, the song appears on his live setlist for the DVD concert release, Who Put the M in Manchester? (2005).

== Release ==
In addition to its release as the opening song on Meat Is Murder, "The Headmaster Ritual" was released as a single in the Netherlands. It peaked at No. 15 on the Tipparade ("bubbling under") of the Dutch Top 40. The cover art for the single, chosen by Morrissey, features a black-and-white image of a child dressed as a cowboy from the 1966 film The Uncle. The song also appeared as a B-side on the American single release of "How Soon Is Now?"

The song's lyrics attracted controversy upon release, with the incumbent headmaster of Morrissey's alma mater interviewing with UK tabloids. The Manchester Education Authority threatened to ban the Smiths from playing in Manchester due to their objection to the song's lyrics.

== Critical reception ==
Pitchfork spoke glowingly of the song, writing "When [Meat Is Murder] is good, it's great: 'The Headmaster Ritual', especially, is full of chills-down-the-spine moments from Morrissey (the wordless, yodelling chorus that rhymes with 'I want to go home/ I don't want to stay,' the second verse's thrilling deviations from the first)" and commenting, "It's safe to say that nobody else, before or since, has opened a significant rock album by hammering the bejesus out of the capoed, open-tuned chord that begins 'The Headmaster Ritual'."

Consequence ranked the song as the 24th best Smiths song, writing, "There's something almost spectral about the open-tuned chord Marr hammers in the song's intro. It's echoed in the tremolo effect Morrissey's vocals achieve in the chorus, which sounds halfway between a yodel and a cry for help." Guitar named the song as the band's 11th-greatest guitar moment, stating, "An in-your-face, staccato acoustic guitar assault triggers the beginning of Meat Is Murder, before dissolving away into one of Marr's slinkiest riffs, effortlessly evoking those formative days on the school playing fields". Rolling Stone named the song as the 39th-best Smiths song.

Singer and Smiths collaborator Kirsty MacColl praised the song in a 1992 interview, stating, "'The Headmaster Ritual' is just so good. The lyrics are fantastic. ... In this song, the delivery is great, and the playing is fantastic, but the lyrics are something else. I think it's probably one of the best songs about being at school that I've ever heard." Colin Meloy of the Decemberists said of the song, "The brute in 'The Headmaster Ritual' was [to me] my mustached, short-shorted gym teacher Mr. Trenary."

== Cover versions ==
It was covered by Radiohead for a 2007 webcast. After watching the cover, Marr joked, "I have shown Ed O'Brien the chords, but maybe he was looking out of the window!"

== Track listing ==
7" MD 5290 (Netherlands)
No.	Title	Length
1.	"The Headmaster Ritual"	4:52
2.	"Oscillate Wildly"	2:32

12" MD 125295 (Netherlands)
No.	Title	Length
1.	"The Headmaster Ritual"	4:52
2.	"Nowhere Fast"	2:31
3.	"Stretch Out and Wait"	2:49
4.	"Shakespeare's Sister"	2:12
5.	"Meat Is Murder"	5:34
