= Rob Hallett =

English executive

- Occupations: Music industry executive, entrepreneur
- Years active: 1970s–present
- Employer(s): AEG, Mean Fiddler Music Group, Marshall Arts, Derek Block Agency
- Organization: Robomagic
- Known for: Founding AEG UK; Head of international touring for AEG; Founder of Robomagic
- Children: 1
- Awards: Evening Standard's Top 5 in Music (2007); The Guardian's Top 100 most powerful people in music (2011)

Rob Hallett is a British music industry executive and entrepreneur best known for founding the AEG UK office in 2005 and leading its international touring division for a decade.

Hallett founded the AEG UK office in 2005 and worked for ten years as the head of international touring. Hallett has also been a festival programmer, tour manager, music publisher, record label managing director, recording studio owner, and artist manager. He appeared in the Evening Standard's Top 5 in Music in 2007, and was listed in the top 100 most powerful people in music by The Guardian in 2011.

== Career ==
=== Early career ===
Hallett was introduced to the live music industry as a teenager promoting gigs in a local pub in Brighton After meeting Malcolm McLaren, then manager of the Sex Pistols, in London, Hallett went on to arrange shows for the punk rock band. Reggae also played a vital role in Hallett's early career. He later worked with The Clash's singer Joe Strummer, Tappa Zukie, and UB40. Hallett went on to own the UK reggae label Manic Records in the late 1970s and set up Equinox Phonographic Recordings in the 80s in partnership with Andy Taylor from Duran Duran.

=== Duran Duran ===
In the 1980s, Hallett worked at Derek Block Agency whose clients included Duran Duran, Adam Ant, Talk Talk and Dexys Midnight Runners. Hallett arranged Duran Duran's first ever gig at The Marquee Club in London when they were still an unsigned band, a moment he counts as his first big career break. He was lauded by The Times as the music mogul who discovered Duran Duran and in 1983, at the age of 22, he toured with them in Japan.

Hallett spent 10 years at Marshall Arts where he made the transition from being an artist agent to a concert promoter. Hallett went on to be a director of Mean Fiddler Music Group from 1999 to 2004, where he established the company's touring division.

In February 2005, Hallett founded the AEG Live office in the UK.

=== Prince ===
In 2007, Hallett brought Prince's shows to London's O2 Arena In 2009, he was working with Michael Jackson, shortly before Jackson's unexpected death, to organise his final performances in London.

=== Leonard Cohen ===
Hallett worked with Leonard Cohen to arrange his world tour from 2008 to 2010. In 2009 Hallett agreed with Cohen to donate AEG Live's proceeds from Cohen's show at the Ramat Gan Stadium, Israel, to Israeli and Palestinian organizations that were working towards reconciliation.

=== AEG ===
Whilst at AEG, Hallet's portfolio also included tours by Jennifer Lopez, Justin Bieber, Usher, and Black Eyed Peas; the Barclaycard presents British Summer Time concert series at Hyde Park; and the Capital Radio SummerTime Ball. In 2012 Hallett and AEG Live produced tours with Bon Jovi, Justin Bieber, Leonard Cohen, Rod Stewart, The Who, and The Rolling Stones.

=== O2 Arena ===
Hallett was involved in transitioning the Millennium Dome in southeast London into O2 Arena, To mark Jamaica's 50th year of independence in 2012, Hallett arranged Respect Jamaica 50 at the O2.

=== Robomagic ===
In 2014 Hallett left AEG Live after a decade to launch the London-based music firm Robomagic. The name Robomagic was decided upon in homage to the 1973 Kurt Vonnegut novel "Breakfast of Champions" which features a company called The Robo-Magic Corporation of America. Hallett's first arena tour with Robomagic was with Duran Duran, as well as promoting the will.i.am Landmarks Live in Concert Tour, which included a show in the Royal Albert Hall.

In 2015 Hallett's Robomoagic worked with Nile Rodgers to promote FOLD Festival in Riverhead New York and London. In 2016 Hallett was part of the team that brought the New Orleans–based Essence Festival to South Africa for its inaugural edition. Robomagic has also ventured into music production, with their offshoot label Robotune releasing the debut EP of rock duo Nova Twins in 2016.

In 2018 Robomagic joined Live Nation. From 2017 to 2019 Hallett was promoting Bon Jovi's European tour. In 2020 after three years at Live Nation, Hallett and Live Nation announced that his company Robomagic would be leaving Live Nation.

== Charity work ==
From 2006 to 2009 Hallett served as a patron for the charity Versus Cancer and was appointed to the Tickets for Troops advisory board in 2014. In 2009 agreed on behalf of AEG Live to join Leonard Cohen in donating all net proceeds from Cohen's concert at the Ramat Gan Stadium to the newly established Fund For Reconciliation, Tolerance and Peace, which provided financial support for organizations and individuals working in Israel and the Palestinian Authority that strive to achieve peace in the region. Hallett also sits as a trustee for the foundation Vocal Futures, which works to encourage young people to engage with classical music. Hallett worked with the London-based charity Julie's Bicycle in their work to support the creative community to act on climate change and environmental sustainability as well as the charity DISARM, set up in response to the growing levels of violent crime within vulnerable communities around Great Britain. In 2013 Hallett, with AEG Live, worked on Unity: A Concert for Stephen Lawrence at the O2 Arena, for the Stephen Lawrence Charitable Trust.

== Personal life ==
Hallett grew up in Sussex, working his first job in a chicken factory. A supporter of Chelsea Football Club, he lives in North London with his partner and his son. He is a self-confessed 'wine buff'.
