= D.A.R.K. (band) =

American music band (2009–2017)

- Origin: New York City, United States
- Genres: Alternative rock, dark wave, post-punk, electronica, experimental rock, electronic rock
- Years active: 2009–2017
- Past members: Olé Koretsky; Andy Rourke; Dolores O'Riordan; DJ Wool
- Website: darkofficial.com

D.A.R.K. was an alternative rock band formed in New York City in early 2009. It was initially founded under the name Jetlag by Olé Koretsky and former Smiths bassist Andy Rourke. In April 2014, the band began recording new material with Cranberries vocalist Dolores O'Riordan, and subsequently changed its name to D.A.R.K. An album, titled Science Agrees, was released on September 9, 2016, through Cooking Vinyl. The media described the band as a Smiths/Cranberries supergroup.

In 2017, Koretsky teamed with DJ Wool under the D.A.R.K. name to tour as an opening act for the Cranberries. On January 15, 2018, O'Riordan died by drowning, aged 46. On May 19, 2023, Rourke died from pancreatic cancer, at the age of 59. Koretsky continues to work as a solo artist.

== Discography ==
- Science Agrees (9 September 2016)
