= Versus Cancer =

2006–2009 British annual charity concert

- Genre: Indie rock
- Dates: Annually
- Location: Manchester Evening News Arena
- Years active: 2006-2009
- Founders: Tom Smetham, Stephen Chapman, Nova Rehman and Andy Rourke
- Website: www.versuscancer.org

Versus Cancer was an annual concert, reportedly then the largest annual charity concert in the United Kingdom. It raised money predominantly for Cancer Hospital Christie Hospital in Manchester to assist research for effective alternative treatments but acted more as a blanket charity aiming to help fund hospitals or organisations that may require assistance.

In 2005 Manchester Versus Cancer was founded by Andy Rourke (bass player from The Smiths), Nova Rehman his ex-manager, Tom Smetham a former ITV Granada Television producer and Stephen Chapman a former ITV News journalist. It is now known as Versus Cancer. It was set up as a response by Andy and Nova to Nova's Sister Nina and his Father Sheik Abdur both being diagnosed with bowel cancer and the first two concerts were initially funded by Nova. Sadly they both succumbed to the disease.

In 2007 shortly after the concert, Tom and Stephen left Versus Cancer to pursue other projects. Nova, in a departure from his long-time work in the music industry is currently working with green investment funds and creating bespoke products for the energy industry, two fintech payment processing companies, a technology incubator and a funding entity.

With most of the original staff having moved on to other projects it is not expected that Versus Cancer will regain its original momentum.

It has been reported that the Charity will some years off from live work whilst working on a new formula for fundraising and execution of new joint venture projects aimed at prevention of cancer through various media.

In 2009 Andy Rourke quit his band project with Mani and Peter Hook called Freebass and moved to New York. Tom Smetham now lives in Los Angeles as a producer and Stephen Chapman developed new regional projects working with large NW based companies.

== History ==
=== Great Northern Productions ===
Versus Cancer began as Great Northern Productions Ltd. Originally formed by Andy, Tom, Stephen and Nova, Great Northern Productions was a production company created to film music and documentaries. Great Northern Productions was preparing to create an alternative musical buzz in the city when Nova's sister Nina was diagnosed with cancer.

At a Great Northern Productions meeting in a local Manchester pub, the decision was finalised to put on a small charity gig to raise some money to raise awareness of the disease. Later it was agreed that [Christie Hospital would become a major beneficiary. Badly Drawn Boy agreed to play and the concept of a small local gig was created. It was at Peter Hook's insistence that Nova write a letter to New Order which was read out at a band meeting which crystallised the event into what it became. It was New Order's stamp of approval that gave momentum to the event.

As more bands signed up, the small gig was put to the side and a large scale concert was formulated. The Manchester Evening News Arena was the biggest venue available and one which could raise the most money. The Manchester Evening News Arena is widely known as a boxing venue where posters advertising fights would illustrate a bout between two fighters with a "Vs". The artists being from Manchester and the enemy being Cancer, the name Manchester Vs Cancer" was born. Great Northern Productions was then split into the charity Great Northern Aid Trust and GNA Trading Ltd, the company whose function was to put the concert on.

=== Great Northern Aid Trust/Versus Cancer ===
Andy Rourke and Nova Rehman became the directors of the charity Great Northern Aid Trust and working with colleagues Tom and Stephen at GNA Trading Ltd began to get bands together using Andy's little black book of contacts.

New Order became the first band to confirm the show..swiftly followed by Johnny Marr and then Doves.

=== GNA Trading Ltd ===
Tom Smetham and Stephen Chapman became the directors of GNA Trading Ltd. Tom was working with his friend Tony Wilson on his annual In the City music convention and agreed the free use of his office and all facilities due to the worthiness of the cause. Once the arena was booked, GNA Trading Ltd pulled in favours from across the spectrum of the TV and Music industry in order to organise and film the event.

Tom and Stephen left GNA Trading Ltd in late 2007 to head to where they became producers of The Tube (Radio Series) for UK1 Productions and broadcast on Channel 4 Radio. They still produce the televisual element of the show today. Katharine Mainprize and James Ward took on the role of GNA Trading Ltd directors. Joel Perry of Mondiale Publishing became more involved with the organisation following the first concert and worked closely on elements of the second show with Dave Lawrence, the production manager. He negotiated the official blessing of then Prime Minister Tony Blair (who wrote an introduction to the official programme opposite Tony Wilson).

== Projects and campaigns ==
The money raised by Versus Cancer has gone towards raising funds for several different projects. Every year there is an awareness campaign aimed at young people to encourage them to check for lumps on breast and testicles. In 2008 a "check your moles" advert appeared with other billboard ads which feature in the weeks coming up to the event.

== Patrons ==
Patrons of the charity include all three the leaders of the main political parties in the UK at that time. Prime Minister David Cameron and Deputy Prime Minister of the United Kingdom Nick Clegg. Other patrons include Peter Hook, Danny Macnamara, Menzies Campbell, Gordon Brown, Rob Hallett VP AEG Live and Barry Dickens ITB.

== Mick Rock Exhibition 9 February 2006 ==
Manchester Vs Cancer exhibited the full gallery of the prints taken by Mick Rock on the evening of the 2006 concert at Vox Pop record shop on Thomas Street in Manchester (now called Cup) and was very much driven by Tom Smetham. The prints along with the guitars and amp signed by all the artists on the night were all auctioned to raise money for the charity at a gala dinner in 2008 based at the MEN arena.

== The event ==
The main concert takes place at the Manchester Evening News Arena in Manchester UK although plans have been mooted by Rob Hallett to allow the use of the O2 arena.

=== First concert 28 January 2006 ===
Shortly after the new year, New Order were announced. T-shirts and programmes were designed and printed plus two of the guitars signed by the bands were signed by Noel Gallagher and Liam Gallagher as they could not make the event.

Mick Rock was brought on board as the official photographer. A world first took place at the concert, where the audience could donate towards the charity by texting a code shown on the big arena screen between bands to download Mick's backstage photos seconds after they were taken.

History was made during the first year when Johnny Marr took to the stage with Rourke for the first time in nineteen years with an acclaimed version of The Smiths' classic "How Soon Is Now?" Marr opened with The Smiths' "There Is A Light That Never Goes Out", much to the surprise and delight of the audience. Both Smiths classics featured Marr on vocals for the performance. Rourke dedicated "How Soon Is Now?" to Nina.

New Order's performance was purely a Joy Division set and included the song "Twenty Four Hours", claiming its first live outing since the death of Joy Division frontman Ian Curtis. It was their last televised performance before their split in July 2007.

Notable collaborations included Doves performing "There Goes The Fear" with Marr and Guy Garvey from Elbow. Doves also played R Dean Taylor's "There's a Ghost in My House" and "Vicious" by Lou Reed, sung by Bernard Sumner with Marr on guitar.

Badly Drawn Boy began "Silent Sigh" with a verse and chorus of Madonna's "Like a Virgin" and later appeared a second time to perform with Doves.

808 State appeared with MC Tunes to perform "The Only Rhyme That Bites".

The finale delivered the most unusual collection of Manchester legends ever performing together on one stage. A rendition of the Happy Mondays anthem "Wrote For Luck" was performed by Shaun Ryder, Bez, Doves, Bernard Summer, Peter Hook, Marr, Joel Perry, Rourke, Wags and Badly Drawn Boy.

Artists Domino Bones, 808 State, Elbow, Stephen Fretwell, Nine Black Alps, Badly Drawn Boy, Johnny Marr and The Healers, Doves, New Order (as Joy Division), Finale

DJs Mani, Graeme Park, Utah Saints, DJ Tintin

=== Second concert 30 March 2007 ===
The second concert built on the success of the first with another large Manchester bill. Manchester Vs Cancer had been renamed Versus Cancer by Truth Creative (a Manchester-based Brand Consultancy) to open it up to a wider audience and increase global appeal. Noel Gallagher was announced as headline, the arena was a sell-out. Official photographer this time was Kevin Cummins (photographer). The Charlatans were on the bill as was Ian Brown.

Collaborations on the night included Paul Weller with The Charlatans playing "Town Called Malice", "Can't Get Out of Bed" and the John Lennon classic "Power to the People" with added vocals from Denise Johnson. Weller also appeared towards the end of the night with Noel Gallagher to perform "The Butterfly Collector" and Noel (whose semi-acoustic set involved a large string section) performed The Smiths' "There is a Light that Never Goes Out".

There was a rare outing for David McAlmont and Bernard Butler who played Butler's biggest hit, "Yes", as a duet with Denise Johnson and The Smiths' "Still Ill".

Echo & the Bunnymen were joined onstage by Peter Hook for New Order's "Ceremony".

Ian Brown who had performed earlier returned to the stage for the finale with Mani and Rourke where they promptly tore the house down with The Stone Roses anthem "I am the Resurrection" .

The final line up

Artists The Scratch, Hippy Mafia, McAlmont & Butler, Echo & the Bunnymen, The Charlatans (+ Paul Weller), Ian Brown, Noel Gallagher (+Paul Weller), Finale.

DJ's Andy and Jez Williams (Doves), Mani, DJ Tintin

=== Third concert 23 February 2008 ===
Whereas the previous years had been predominantly Manchester orientated artists, the third year of Versus Cancer enlisted the influence of a younger musical generation. The Sticks, The Enemy, The View, Athlete and The Fratellis all made an appearance.

Already 2007 had been clouded by the shockingly fast demise of Tony Wilson who died only months after contracting kidney cancer. During the finale of the third concert, an image of Tony appeared on the screens to cheers from the crowd. Tom Smetham and Stephen Chapman filmed the concert through UK 1 Productions with former Top of The Pops producer Chris Cowey as director.

The finale was Rourke bringing Badly Drawn Boy, Peter Hook, Aziz Ibrahim, David Potts from the band Monaco, Denise Johnson and drummer Steve White up to perform The Smiths' "Please, Please, Please Let Me Get What I Want", Joy Division's "Love Will Tear Us Apart" and John Lennon's "Instant Karma!", which was aptly chosen for the occasion.

The final line up

Artists The Sticks, The Farm, Inspiral Carpets, Athlete, The View, Fun Lovin Criminals, Happy Mondays, The Fratellis, The Enemy, Finale

=== Fourth concert 12 December 2009 ===
Playing to a smaller crowd than expected due to lower ticket sales perhaps due in part to Snow Patrol performing two last minute shows in Manchester three weeks prior to the event and withholding permission to use the band's name for promotional purposes, until their own shows had been completed.

The decision to still hold the event was apparently not an easy one although Snow Patrol, Happy Mondays, Tim Booth, Jim Glennie, Larry Gott from James, Puressence, The Twang, Kid British, Peter Hook with the BBC Philharmonic Orchestra, and Joe Duddell who composed the Elbow concert with the Halle Orchestra and Youth choir for the Manchester International Festival performed exciting sets.

== DVD ==
Despite most ofl the Versus Cancer concerts being filmed, only the Scottish show has been broadcast. Speculation of a DVD has been in the pipeline for years but no material being shown to date.

== Other Versus Cancer concerts ==
"Thanks Pranks and Party Pants"..23 May at the Ritz in Manchester was actually Nova's Birthday party, with proceeds going to the Charity. Performers included Echo and the Bunnymen, a reformed Chameleons with Aziz Ibrahim and Andy Rourke, Badly Drawn Boy, Frazer King and others.

A 2008 concert took place in Scotland on Friday 28 November 2008. It was originally due to take place at the Glasgow SECC, but unfortunately the concert was moved to the Glasgow Academy because Echo & the Bunnymen and Alphabeat were both scheduled to play but had to pull out, for family illness and scheduling difficulties, respectively. Nova's father also lost his battle against bowel cancer days before this concert.

The final line up

Artists Attic, Sergeant, Alfonso, The Fratellis, and Travis

== DJ Parties ==
Versus Cancer have been prominent in DJ/House parties promoting the event. The night after the 2007 show, 2 clubs held sponsored DJ nights, with 808 State playing at club Po Na Na, Charles Street, Manchester; and DJ Lowrider playing at the Night & Day club, Oldham Street, Manchester.

After the 2008 show, a party was held at Moho Live, in Manchester, where Danny McNamara of Embrace held an event featuring Dodgy, Boy Kill Boy, Example and The Paddingtons, and a competition was held via the official Myspace looking for an unsigned band to play.
