= Manchester v Cancer =

2006 benefit concert

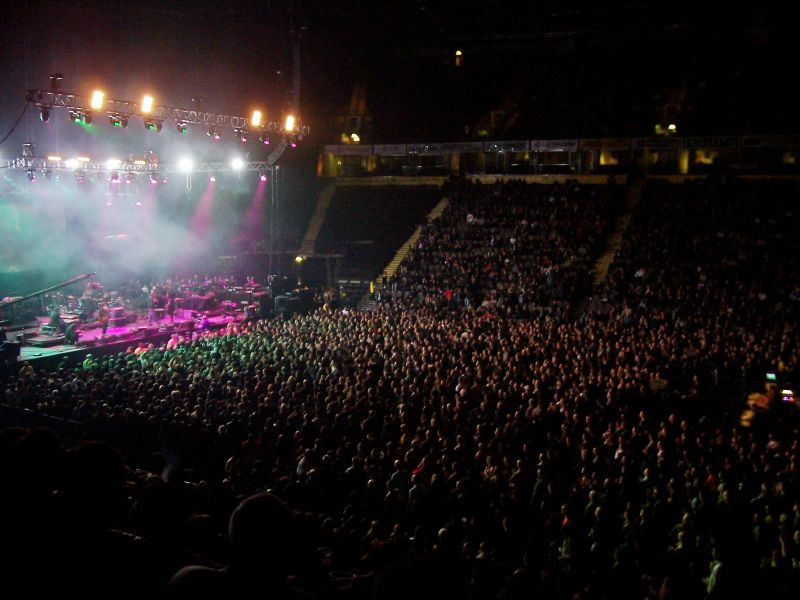
Manchester v Cancer

Manchester v Cancer was a benefit concert that was held on 28 January 2006 at Manchester's MEN Arena, in aid of cancer research at the Christie Hospital in Manchester, Europe's largest cancer research and treatment centre.

The concert was organised by ex-Smith Andy Rourke, Nova Rehman, Tom Smetham and Steven Chapman when his manager Nova found out that his sister and father had both been diagnosed with cancer. Rourke aimed to raise £1 million from the concert. Nova paid for all costs in the set up of the first three concerts and was repaid after each show.

The early sets were very short and direct with Nine Black Alps and Badly Drawn Boy among the highlights. Badly Drawn Boy played the intro to Madonna's "Like a Virgin" which entered into his song "Silent Sigh".

Originally it was rumoured that Andy Rourke would be playing alongside fellow ex-Smith Johnny Marr at the concert, but Marr dispelled this myth, saying that he would in fact be playing with his band The Healers. Johnny Marr entered the stage with his new band and performed There Is a Light That Never Goes Out by his old band, provoking a positive audience response. He proceeded to play three songs by The Healers including Down on the Corner from his Boomslang album. Then to close Marr's set, Rourke joined The Healers on stage to perform How Soon Is Now?. Rourke's presence on stage marked the first time the two had performed in public together since 1987.

Doves collaborated with a number of artists during the night. They were joined by Bernard Sumner and Johnny Marr for a cover of Lou Reed's hit Vicious. They also played a number of their own songs including Snowden and Black And White Town. New Order headlined the night, playing a set of old Joy Division songs including She's Lost Control, Transmission and Love Will Tear Us Apart.

As part of the show's finale, both Marr and Rourke played together alongside New Order and Doves on a mass rendition of Happy Mondays' song Wrote For Luck, lyrics being sung by Mondays' frontman Shaun Ryder.

== List of Artists ==
- New Order
- Doves
- Badly Drawn Boy
- Johnny Marr and the Healers
- Andy Rourke
- Nine Black Alps
- Bez & Domino Bones
- Graeme Park
- Elbow
- Utah Saints
- 808 State
- MC Tunes
- Mr Scruff
- Mani
- Stephen Fretwell

The official photographer for the event was Mick Rock.

== Tickets ==
Tickets for the event were put on sale at 10am on Saturday, 17 December 2005 and cost £40. The upper tier of the venue was also opened due to popular demand, and tickets for the upper tier were priced at £25.
