= Shakespeare's Sister (song) =

Single by the Smiths
- B-side: "What She Said"; "Stretch Out and Wait"
- Released: 18 March 1985
- Recorded: January 1985
- Studio: Ridge Farm, Surrey, UK
- Genre: Rockabilly
- Length: 2:09
- Label: Rough Trade
- Composer: Johnny Marr
- Lyricist: Morrissey
- Producer: The Smiths

The Smiths singles chronology
"Barbarism Begins at Home" (1985)	"Shakespeare's Sister" (1985)	"That Joke Isn't Funny Anymore" (1985)

"Shakespeare's Sister" is a song by the English rock band the Smiths. Released in March 1985, it reached No. 26 in the UK Singles Chart. It is also featured on the compilation albums Louder Than Bombs and The World Won't Listen. The front cover to the single features former Coronation Street star Pat Phoenix, dressed up as her character Elsie Tanner.

== Background ==
The title refers to a section of Virginia Woolf's feminist essay A Room of One's Own in which she argues that if William Shakespeare had had a sister of equal genius, as a woman she would not have had the opportunity to make use of it. Sean O'Hagan says that the essay was "one of the many feminist texts Morrissey embraced as a sexually confused, politically-awakened adolescent".

According to Simon Goddard, the lyrics also draw on Elizabeth Smart's novella By Grand Central Station I Sat Down and Wept and the Billy Fury song "Don't Jump". The song's narrative has been compared to The Glass Menagerie by Tennessee Williams, in which the character of Laura Wingfield is referred to as "Shakespeare's sister" by the character Jim O'Connor because the latter refers to Laura's brother Tom, an aspiring writer, as "Shakespeare".

== Release ==
The song had some disagreements regarding its release. The boss of Rough Trade Geoff Travis had little faith in the song, and thought that it was too short.

Released as a standalone single, "Shakespeare's Sister" was a relative disappointment commercially, reaching number 26 in the UK charts. Marr reflected, "It didn't surprise me that a song like 'Shakespeare's Sister' didn't get in the charts. It was a very arch record to release at that time. Quite audacious, a bit mad. That's why I loved it." Morrissey, meanwhile, attributed the underperformance to Rough Trade's insufficient promotion of the single, claiming the label "released 'Shakespeare's Sister' with a monstrous amount of defeatism".

== Track listing ==
7" RT181
No.	Title	Length
1.	"Shakespeare's Sister"	2:09
2.	"What She Said"	2:40

12" RTT181
No.	Title	Length
1.	"Shakespeare's Sister"	2:09
2.	"What She Said"	2:40
3.	"Stretch Out and Wait"	2:37

== Artwork and matrix message ==
The original single's sleeve cover featured Pat Phoenix, best known for her long-running role as Elsie Tanner in the British soap opera Coronation Street. Phoenix also featured in the 1962 film The L-Shaped Room, a portion of which was sampled for a later Smiths song, "The Queen Is Dead" from the album of the same name.

The British 7" and 12" vinyls contained the matrix message: HOME IS WHERE THE ART IS/none

The Netherlands versions contained the message: HOLLAND CUTTING/none. "Holland cutting" was an etching on the Dutch version of the album Meat Is Murder.

== Charts ==
Chart (1985)	Peak position
Ireland (IRMA)	11
UK Singles (The Official Charts Company)	26
UK Indie	1

== Reception ==
Professional ratings
Review scores
Source	Rating
AllMusic	3/5 stars

In a retrospective review of the song, Jack Rabid of Allmusic wrote, "The Smiths' weakest is still quite good, is what we can infer from this. What wit Morrissey still shows, record after record? Who else is writing an opening line like 'Young bones groan/And the rocks below say/Throw your skinny body down, son!' – thus evoking the tragic Romeo and Juliet quality of so much teenage romance in the most poetic terms?"

Writer Jon Savage described it as "essentially a suicide drama set to a demented rock'n'roll rhythm".

== Influence ==
The duo Shakespears Sister [sic] took their name from the song.
