= Meat Is Murder =

Studio album by the Smiths
- Released: 11 February 1985
- Recorded: 1984
- Studios: Johnny Marr's flat (Earl's Court); Jam Studios (London); Ridge Farm (Surrey); Fallout Shelter (Chiswick)
- Genres: Indie rock; post-punk
- Length: 39:46
- Label: Rough Trade
- Producer: The Smiths

The Smiths chronology
| Hatful of Hollow (1984) | Meat Is Murder (1985) | The Queen Is Dead (1986) |

Singles from Meat Is Murder
- 1. "Barbarism Begins at Home" Released: January 1985; 2. "That Joke Isn't Funny Anymore" Released: 5 July 1985; 3. "The Headmaster Ritual" Released: July 1985

Meat Is Murder is the second studio album by the English rock band the Smiths, released on 11 February 1985 by Rough Trade Records. Following the release of their self-titled debut album in early 1984, the Smiths maintained a prolific output with non-album singles and the compilation Hatful of Hollow, while also drawing media attention for their outspoken political views and provocative lyrics. The band began working with engineer Stephen Street during this period, a collaboration that continued into Meat Is Murder.

Recording for the album took place between mid-1984 and December of that year, with sessions held in London at the Fallout Shelter and Jam Studios, and in Surrey at Ridge Farm Studio. Guitarist Johnny Marr developed many of the demos in his Earl's Court flat, often incorporating BBC sound effects records provided by Morrissey, a technique that became a recurring part of their creative process.

Musically, the album expanded the band's sound, incorporating elements of indie rock and post-punk. It marked a shift toward more overtly political themes, with songs addressing vegetarianism, corporal punishment, and social alienation. It became the band's only studio album to reach number one on the UK Albums Chart, and stayed on the chart for 13 weeks. The album was an international success, spending eleven weeks on the European Top 100 Albums chart and peaking at number 29. In the United States, it reached number 110 on the Billboard 200.

== Background ==
Following the release of their self-titled debut studio album The Smiths, the band continued to generate both critical attention and controversy; the song "Suffer Little Children" addressed the Moors murders and drew backlash from the press and some members of the public. The Sun claimed the track was insensitive to the victims' families, alleging it contained offensive lyrical content. Morrissey expressed distress at these allegations and the lack of opportunity to publicly clarify his intentions. In response, the band issued a press statement affirming that the song did not condone child abuse and had been written with serious intent. In the aftermath, a positive outcome emerged when Morrissey was contacted by Ann West, the mother of Lesley Ann Downey, a ten-year-old girl who had been killed in the Moors murders, who came to believe that the song was written with sincere and respectful intentions.

In May and September 1984, they released the non-album singles "Heaven Knows I'm Miserable Now" and "William, It Was Really Nothing", respectively. The former became their first top ten hit in the United Kingdom, and both songs were later included on the compilation Hatful of Hollow, released in November 1984. "Heaven Knows I'm Miserable Now" marked the beginning of the band's collaboration with then-engineer Stephen Street, who would become a key figure in their subsequent recordings. They had first met Street on the session for the song and requested his contact number. The Hatful of Hollow compilation brought together BBC Radio session tracks, B-sides, and alternative versions of previously released songs, further consolidating the band's early fanbase and public presence.

Morrissey would often bring a political stance to many of his interviews. Among his targets were the Thatcher administration, the monarchy, and his musical contemporaries. When asked about Band Aid, which was being strongly promoted in the UK media at the time, he quipped, "One can have great concern for the people of Ethiopia, but it's another thing to inflict daily torture on the people of England". Similarly, he began to promote vegetarianism in live shows and interviews, on one occasion convincing a Scottish TV show to air footage of slaughterhouses during the dinner hour.

== Writing and recording ==
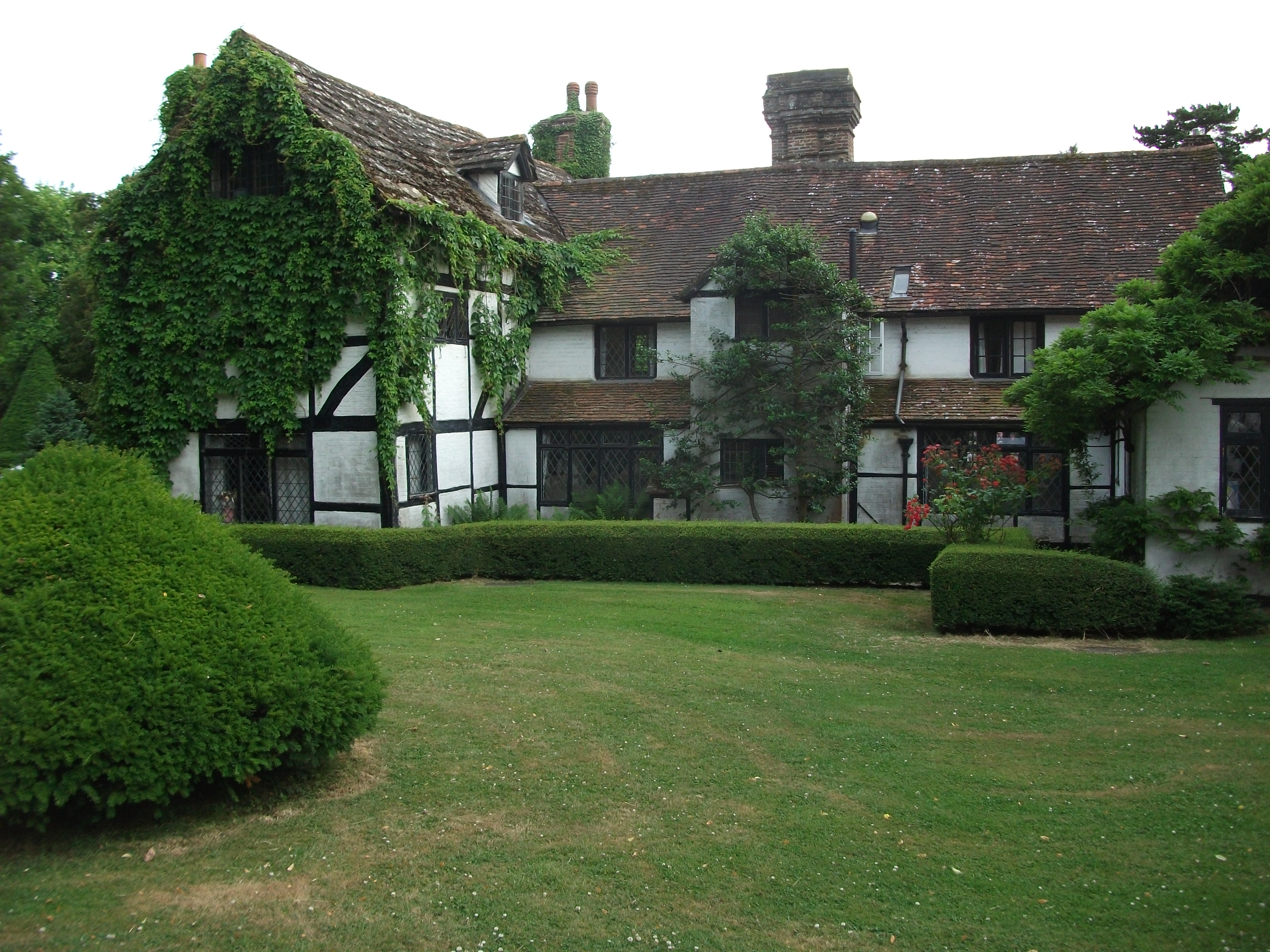
Ridge Farm Studio building in 2015

According to music journalist Simon Goddard, although second albums are often challenging for artists, the Smiths entered the recording of their second album with confidence and without the usual difficulties, following the critical success of their debut album. Guitarist Johnny Marr described the period leading up to Meat Is Murder as one of "youthful pioneering". To build the album's soundscape, Morrissey provided Marr and Street with his personal copies of BBC sound effects records from which to source samples. Morrissey would continue this practice on future Smiths singles and albums.

The album began to be recorded in mid-1984 while the band was based in London. Marr composed and recorded most of the demos in his flat in Earl's Court before passing them to Morrissey, who lived nearby in Kensington. During a July 1984 session at Jam Studios in North London with producer John Porter, the band also began working on "Nowhere Fast", a track later included on the album. Final recordings for the album were completed in mid-December at the Ridge Farm Studio in Surrey. Additional engineering and finishing touches were carried out at Fallout Shelter Studios in Chiswick, London.

== Musical style ==
Music critics have categorised Meat Is Murder as an indie rock and post-punk recording. Goddard noticed that the album demonstrated the band's growing versatility, blending Beatles-like pop music with acoustic melancholy. The lyrics explore a range of themes, including love, teenage angst, and death. Meat Is Murder adopted a more political and emotional tone than its predecessor. In an interview with David Daley, Morrissey described the album as a "dark", "rainy" and "political" album. Tracks containing these themes include the pro-vegetarian title track, reflecting Morrissey's advocacy for animal rights, and songs such as "Barbarism Begins at Home", which addressed the issue of corporal punishment. The record moved beyond the emotional introspection of their debut, with Morrissey and Marr expanding both their lyrical and musical scope. Songs like "The Headmaster Ritual" featured extended instrumental intros and complex arrangements. Author John King has suggested that the title track was inspired by the 1983 song "Meat Means Murder" by the anarcho-punk band Conflict, which deals with the same topic and also opens at a slow pace.

== Release and artwork ==
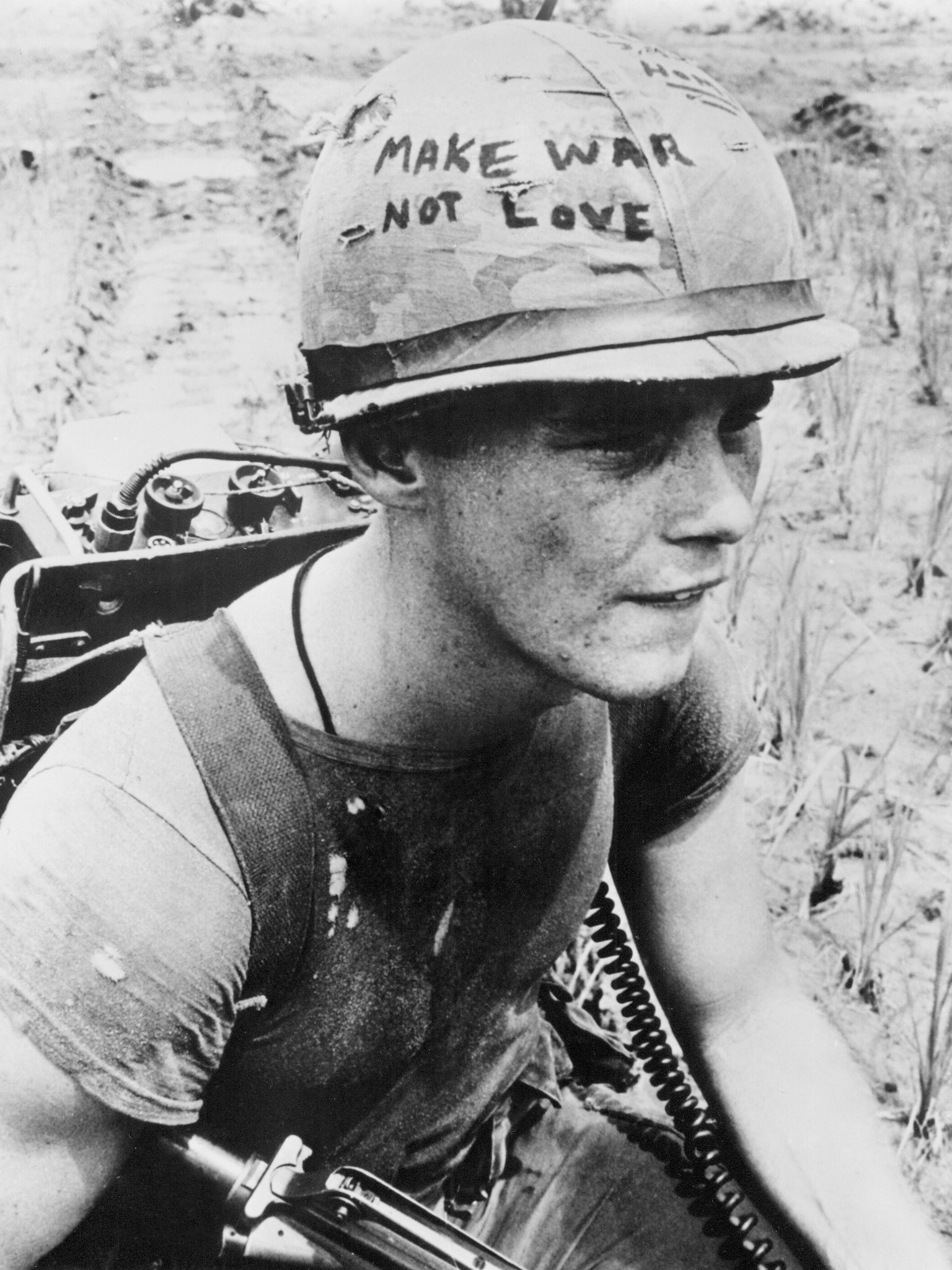
The original un-altered photograph of Michael Wynn

Meat Is Murder was released on 11 February 1985 via Rough Trade Records. The Smiths embarked on a nationwide tour in the spring of 1985 to promote the album. Meat Is Murder was released without an advance single in the UK. This was due to Rough Trade's decision to reissue the previous B-side, "How Soon Is Now?", as a single in January 1985, just before the album's release, and include it in the American version. In July 1985, "That Joke Isn't Funny Anymore" was issued as a single, with a live version of "Meat Is Murder" as the B-side. "Barbarism Begins at Home" was considered for a single release, and a 12-inch vinyl radio promo was produced and distributed in Europe, but no commercial single was released in the UK at the time. "Barbarism Begins at Home" was released as a single in Germany and Italy.

The album's cover uses a 1967 photograph of the American Marine Corporal Michael Wynn during the Vietnam War, though with the wording on his helmet changed from "Make War Not Love" to "Meat Is Murder". The original image was used in Emile de Antonio's 1968 Oscar-nominated documentary In the Year of the Pig. The album sleeve was designed by Morrissey and the layout by Caryn Gough. Morrissey stated that this image intended to illustrate that the only way to end industries like the meat is to give people "a taste of their own medicine". Wynn stated in 2019 that he was never asked permission for the use of the photo, and that he "wasn't real happy" that the wording on the helmet was changed. "The Headmaster Ritual" was additionally released as a single in the Netherlands in July 1985, with a UK release in 1988 and an Australia/New Zealand release in 1990.

The album became the Smiths' only studio album to reach number one on the UK Albums Chart, debuting with gold-certified shipments of over 100,000 copies on its first day and displacing Bruce Springsteen's Born in the U.S.A. from the top position. After this initial success, the album remained on the chart for thirteen weeks. In his memoir Autobiography, Morrissey recalled that Rough Trade founder Geoff Travis marked the band's chart success by gifting him a bag of biscuits, still bearing a £2.75 price tag, as a token of appreciation for delivering the label's first number one album. Meat Is Murder achieved international success, charting for eleven weeks in the European Top 100 Albums chart and peaking at number 29. It also entered the US Billboard 200, where it reached number 110.

== Reception and legacy ==
Professional ratings
Review scores
| Source | Rating |
|---|---|
| AllMusic | 3.5/5 stars |
| Blender | 3/5 stars |
| Chicago Tribune | 2/4 stars |
| The Encyclopedia of Popular Music | 4/5 stars |
| Pitchfork | 8.1/10 |
| Q | 4/5 stars |
| The Rolling Stone Album Guide | 2/5 stars |
| Select | 4/5 |
| Sounds | 4.5/5 stars |
| Uncut | 4/5 stars |
| The Village Voice | C+ |

Meat Is Murder has generally seen positive critical reception since its release. Stephen Thomas Erlewine, reviewing for AllMusic, wrote that the album "beg[a]n to branch out and diversify, while refining the jangling guitar pop of their debut". He noted that while the production is more detailed, the album ultimately "repeats lyrical and musical ideas of before without significantly expanding them or offering enough hooks or melodies to make it the equal of The Smiths or Hatful of Hollow". Douglas Wolk, in his review for Pitchfork, gave the album an 8.1 out of 10, saying that Meat Is Murder "is better recorded than The Smiths, although it's more a bunch of songs that didn't fit on singles than a coherent album". He also said that Morrissey is "often painfully out of tune" on weaker tracks. Uncut's Stephen Dalton gave the album four out of five stars, stating that the album "expands on the folk-pop classicism of their debut", describing it as "far more dynamic and diverse".

Rob Sheffield gave the album two out of five stars in The Rolling Stone Album Guide, part of the Rolling Stone magazine, describing Meat Is Murder as a "tuneless cow-humping self-parody", criticizing its heavy-handed lyrical themes: "meat is murder, love is larceny, girls are gruesome, etc." He noted that fans sadly assumed "the Smiths had moped their last mope". Robert Christgau gave the album a grade of C+ via The Village Voice and wrote that the album "imposes post-adolescent sensitivity" on its audience, inspiring "the sneaking suspicion that they're less sensitive than they come on". He described the album's tone as "passive-aggressive" and stated it "begs for a belt in the chops". As BBC Music's Daryl Easlea acknowledged in 2007, "there was no other British group making music quite like this in 1985".

In 2003, Meat Is Murder was ranked number 295 on the magazine's list of Rolling Stone's 500 Greatest Albums of All Time, and 296 in a 2012 revised list. The album was also included in the book 1001 Albums You Must Hear Before You Die (2005). Alan York listed the album's cover 1st in his list of "The Smiths Artworks: All 27 Album And Single Covers, Ranked". In 2016, animal rights advocacy group PETA released a video game titled This Beautiful Creature Must Die, based on the song "Meat Is Murder". The game, which features a chiptune rendition of the song, tasks players with saving animals from being killed.

== Track listing ==
All lyrics are written by Morrissey; all music is composed by Johnny Marr.

Side one
| No. | Title | Length |
|---|---|---|
| 1. | "The Headmaster Ritual" | 4:52 |
| 2. | "Rusholme Ruffians" | 4:20 |
| 3. | "I Want the One I Can't Have" | 3:14 |
| 4. | "What She Said" | 2:42 |
| 5. | "That Joke Isn't Funny Anymore" | 4:59 |
| Total length: | | 20:07 |

Side two
| No. | Title | Length |
|---|---|---|
| 6. | "Nowhere Fast" | 2:37 |
| 7. | "Well I Wonder" | 4:00 |
| 8. | "Barbarism Begins at Home" | 6:57 |
| 9. | "Meat Is Murder" | 6:06 |
| Total length: | | 19:40 |

US LP
| No. | Title | Length |
|---|---|---|
| 6. | "How Soon Is Now?" | 6:44 |
| Total length: | | 46:31 |

Note

- "How Soon Is Now?" was added to the original American LP as the first song on side 2. The song is listed on the vinyl label, but it is not listed on the track listing on the inner or outer sleeve. All US releases prior to 2011 include the song. In the UK, the original LP and CD did not include it, though it was included on the 1993 CD re-release. The 2011 remaster, both CD and LP, restored the original UK track listing in both the UK and US.

== Personnel ==
Credits are adapted from the album's liner notes.

The Smiths

- Morrissey – vocals
- Johnny Marr – guitars, piano, slide guitar ("That Joke Isn't Funny Anymore"), sound effects ("Well I Wonder")
- Andy Rourke – bass guitar
- Mike Joyce – drums, tambourine

Production

- The Smiths – production
- Stephen Street – engineering, sound effects ("Rusholme Ruffians", "I Want the One I Can't Have", and "Meat Is Murder")
- Tim Young – mastering

Design

- Caryn Gough – package layout
- Paul Slattery – group photo
- Toshi Yajima – Morrissey solo-shot

== Charts ==
Chart performance for Meat Is Murder
| Chart (1985) | Peak position |
|---|---|
| Australian Albums (Kent Music Report) | 58 |
| Canadian Albums (RPM) | 40 |
| Dutch Albums (Album Top 100) | 39 |
| European Top 100 Albums | 29 |
| German Albums (Offizielle Top 100) | 45 |
| New Zealand Albums (RMNZ) | 13 |
| Swedish Albums (Sverigetopplistan) | 27 |
| UK Albums (Official Charts) | 1 |
| UK Independent Albums | 1 |
| US Billboard 200 | 110 |
| US Cash Box | 79 |

| Chart (2024) | Peak position |
|---|---|
| Greek Albums (IFPI) | 20 |

== Certifications and sales ==
Certifications and sales for Meat Is Murder
| Region | Certification | Certified units/sales |
|---|---|---|
| United Kingdom (BPI) | Gold | 100,000^{^} |
^{^} Shipments figures based on certification alone.

== See also ==
- List of 1980s albums considered the best

== Bibliography ==
- Goddard, Simon (2013). Songs That Saved Your Life - The Art of The Smiths 1982–87 (2nd ed.). London: Titan Books Limited. ISBN 978-1-78116-259-0.
- Goddard, Simon (2009). Mozipedia: The Encyclopedia of Morrissey and The Smiths. London: Ebury Press. ISBN 978-0091927103.
- McKinney, D. (April 2015). Morrissey FAQ: All That's Left to Know About This Charming Man. Rowman & Littlefield. p. 247. ISBN 978-1-4950-2893-9.
