= Freak Party =

English band

Freak Party was a short-lived Manchester funk band that consisted of future members of the Smiths. Its members were schoolmates Johnny Maher (later known as Johnny Marr) on guitar, Andy Rourke on bass, and Simon Wolstencroft, later of the Fall (and briefly a drummer with the Smiths and the Stone Roses), on drums. The band broke up because they could not find a decent singer, in addition to the fact that Marr did not want to continue with the funk set up any longer. Freak Party made one demo; an instrumental called "Kraak Therapy" in 1981.
