= 1992 – The Love Album =

Studio album by Carter the Unstoppable Sex Machine
- Released: 4 May 1992
- Studio: Notice (South London)
- Genre: Alternative dance, alternative rock, post-punk
- Length: 36:19
- Label: Chrysalis
- Producer: Sex Machine, Simon Painter

Carter the Unstoppable Sex Machine chronology
30 Something (1991)	1992 – The Love Album (1992)	Post Historic Monsters (1993)

Singles from 1992 – The Love Album
- 1. "The Only Living Boy in New Cross" Released: 13 April 1992; 2. "Do Re Me, So Far So Good" Released: 22 June 1992; 3. "The Impossible Dream" Released: 16 November 1992

Professional ratings
Review scores
Source	Rating
Allmusic	4.5/5 stars
Billboard	(favourable)
Drowned in Sound	9/10
Encyclopedia of Popular Music	4/5 stars
Select	4/5 stars

1992 – The Love Album is an album by English band Carter the Unstoppable Sex Machine. Released on Chrysalis Records, following the demise of Rough Trade Records, the album achieved commercial success and became the band's first and only Number 1 album on the UK Albums Chart. It also contained their only Top 10 hit, "The Only Living Boy in New Cross", which reached No. 7 on the UK Singles Chart. The album also included two further singles, "Do Re Me So Far So Good" (UK No. 22) and "The Impossible Dream" (UK No. 21). An earlier single, "After the Watershed" (UK No. 11) was originally planned to be included on the album, but due to an injunction from the publishers of The Rolling Stones over a line in the lyrics quoted from their single "Ruby Tuesday"), the band had to credit the composition to Morrison / Carter / Richards / Jagger. It was omitted from the album as they would otherwise have had to forgo publishing royalties for every copy of the album sold.

A deluxe edition was released in 2012, featuring all of the B-sides, the "After the Watershed (Early Learning the Hard Way)" single reinserted into the original running order, a song from NME's Ruby Trax compilation and live recordings from a performance at the Féile Festival, 31 July 1992.

The album was ranked at No. 32 in NME's list of the top 50 "Albums of the Year" in 1992.

== Track listing ==
All songs written and composed by Morrison and Carter, except where indicated.

=== Original release (1992) ===
Side one
No.	Title	Length
1.	"1993"	3:11
2.	"Is Wrestling Fixed?"	2:03
3.	"The Only Living Boy in New Cross"	3:57
4.	"Suppose You Gave a Funeral and Nobody Came"	4:08
5.	"England"	2:35

Side two
No.	Title	Writer(s)	Length
6.	"Do Re Me, So Far So Good"		3:06
7.	"Look Mum, No Hands!"		2:58
8.	"While You Were Out"		4:02
9.	"Skywest and Crooked" (featuring Ian Dury)		4:50
10.	"The Impossible Dream"	Mitch Leigh, Joe Darion	5:19

=== Deluxe edition (2012) ===
Disc one
No.	Title	Writer(s)	Length
1.	"1993"		3:11
2.	"Is Wrestling Fixed?"		2:03
3.	"The Only Living Boy in New Cross"		3:57
4.	"Suppose You Gave a Funeral and Nobody Came"		4:08
5.	"England"		2:35
6.	"Do Re Me, So Far So Good"		3:06
7.	"After the Watershed"		4:24
8.	"Look Mum, No Hands!"		2:58
9.	"While You Were Out"		4:02
10.	"Skywest and Crooked" (featuring Ian Dury)		4:50
11.	"The Impossible Dream"	Mitch Leigh, Joe Darien	5:19

Disc two
No.	Title	Writer(s)	Length
1.	"The 90's Revival"		2:03
2.	"A Nation of Shoplifters"		2:03
3.	"This Is How It Feels"	Boon, Gill, Lambert, Walsh, Hingley	3:00
4.	"Panic"	Marr, Morrissey	3:02
5.	"Watching the Big Apple Turn Over"		3:28
6.	"King Rocker"	Billy Idol, Tony James	2:26
7.	"Mannequin"	Bruce Gilbert, Colin Newman, Graham Lewis, Robert Gotobed	3:44
8.	"Down in the Tube Station at Midnight"	Paul Weller	3:59
9.	"Turn On, Tune in and Switch Off"		2:27
10.	"When Thesauruses Ruled the Earth"		3:19
11.	"Bring On the Girls"		2:55
12.	"Another Brick in the Wall"	Roger Waters	4:01
13.	"Look Mum, No Hands"		3:04
14.	"Anytime Anyplace Anywhere"		4:10
15.	"Sheriff Fatman"		4:57
16.	"A Prince in a Pauper's Grave"		4:20
17.	"While You Were Out"		4:04
18.	"Shopper's Paradise"		4:49
19.	"After the Watershed"		4:00
20.	"Bloodsport for All"		5:12
21.	"A Perfect Day to Drop the Bomb"		5:53

Disc two notes

- Tracks 1–3 from "After the Watershed" Single (October 1991)
- Tracks 4 and 5 from "The Only Living Boy in New Cross" single
- Tracks 6–8 from "Do Re Me, So Far So Good" single
- Tracks 9–11 from "The Impossible Dream" single
- Track 12 from Ruby Trax compilation (October 1992)
- Tracks 13–21 were recorded live at the Féile Festival, 31 July 1992

== Personnel ==
- Jim "Jim Bob" Morrison - performer
- Les "Fruitbat" Carter - performer
- Sex Machine - producer
- Simon Painter - producer, engineer
- Kevin Metcalf - mastering (at the Townhouse)
- Carter EEC - sleeve design
- Andy G - sleeve design
- Stuart D - sleeve design

== Charts ==
Chart (2010)	Peak position
UK Albums Chart	1
Australia (ARIA Charts)	89
Sweden Sverigetopplistan	35

== Certifications ==
Region	Certification	Certified units/sales
United Kingdom (BPI)	Gold	100,000^{^}
^{^} Shipments figures based on certification alone.
