= Post Historic Monsters =

Studio album by Carter the Unstoppable Sex Machine
- Released: 6 September 1993
- Recorded: 1993
- Genre: Dance-rock; electronic rock; alternative dance; alternative rock
- Length: 50:15
- Label: Chrysalis (UK); Capitol (US)
- Producer: Carter the Unstoppable Sex Machine; Simon Painter

Carter the Unstoppable Sex Machine chronology
1992 – The Love Album (1992)	Post Historic Monsters (1993)	Starry Eyed and Bollock Naked (1994)

Post Historic Monsters is the fourth album by Carter the Unstoppable Sex Machine. It reached No. 5 on the UK Charts becoming the band's second highest album after 1992 - The Love Album which reached No. 1. The album featured two singles "Lean On Me I Won't Fall Over", which reached No. 16 on the UK charts, and "Lenny And Terence," which reached number 40. The band recorded the album with co-producer and engineer Simon Painter and worked in a much more spontaneous approach than before, to an extent that even saw the band crafting songs from accidental pieces.

The album shows the band working in new styles in attempt to "prove themselves" after the critical disdain that the band had started to pick up in late 1992. There are numerous other musical styles explored on the album besides the band's usual drum machine-based punk rock, and some of Jim Bob's lyrics had started to become more personal, sitting alongside tracks which are more traditionally politically or socially based. The album was a critical success, with critics complimenting the new approaches that the band had undertaken. In their lists of the top 50 albums of the year, NME named it 22nd whilst Select named it 46th. The band played the entire album live for the first time in Kentish Town in November 2009.

== Background and recording ==
Cater the Unstoppable Sex Machine reached their commercial peak with 1992 – The Love Album, which debuted at number 1 in the UK Albums Chart in May 1992. The album was released to critical acclaim, and was named the 32nd best album of 1992 by NME at the end of the year. Nonetheless, the band "fell from grace" after the album's release, and the album's third single "The Impossible Dream" was a critically panned flop. The duo soon felt they were only able to garner "the occasional piss-take in the gossip pages." Deadline magazine recalled that it seemed the band "were well and truly finished" and that it appeared people were tired of the band.

For the follow-up album, which the duo named Post Historic Monsters, the band felt a change in approach was necessary. Although singer Jim Bob felt the negative comments at the time of the release of "The Impossible Dream" were "completely pointless," he nonetheless conceded that the duo's output up until that point was "really easy to parody." He felt that "parts of 1992 could have been made by Bobby Davro. It was up for that kind of a bashing." The duo felt it was not only critics but also fans who had grown tired of the duo, and their label who Bob felt lacked the "over-the-top enthusiasm" they bore when the duo signed with them. The duo had also grown tired of writing and playing music, and held off releasing any material for almost a year. Bob said: "We knew we had to come up with a good album or that would have been the end of it." Fruitbat of the duo said that, with Post Historic Monsters, "we knew we had something to prove. We didn't want anybody to be allowed to dismiss us. No fucking way!"

The band recorded Post Historic Monsters in 1993, co-producing the album between themselves and Simon Painter. Painter also engineered the album, whilst Kevin Metcalf mastered it. The duo took a much more spontaneous approach when creating the album than they had with previous albums. As such, several of the songs, which began as mistakes or lesser-projects, became fully developed songs. "The Music That Nobody Likes" had begun as a mistake, whilst "Evil" is "an experimental B-side gone haywire;" Bob said that as a result of creations such as these and the more spontaneous approach that birthed them, the album became "just so much more refreshing."

== Style and composition ==
Keen to "prove themselves" with Post Historic Monsters, the album is a musical and lyrical departure from previous records by the band. According to Deadline magazine, it shows the band "moving into previously uncharted musical and lyrical territories," and made note of the excess of surprises on the album. The album is darker and "more fed-up" than the band's previous albums, with a directness and bitterness that contrasts with the "more overtly tongue in cheek" style of previous albums such as 101 Damnations or 1992: The Love Album. In an interview with Deadline magazine, Jim Bob said "the difference between Post Historic Monsters and the records we have put out since 101 Damnations is that you can listen to it without prejudice. There's none of that stuff that usually puts people off. It's like it doesn't matter that it's a Carter record. It could almost be by anyone."

=== Music ===
Like the band's previous work, Post Historic Monsters is a dance-rock and electronic rock album characterised by its punk rock-styled distorted guitars and chattering sequencers and electronic beats, but there are numerous exceptions to this style throughout the record, including "Being There", which features a lounge music-styled jazz style and a piano solo, the acoustic folk of "Suicide Isn't Painless" and the ironic "mainstream schmaltz" of "Under the Thumb and Over the Moon." "Stuff the Jubilee!" has been compared to the soundtrack of the 1969 musical film Oh! What a Lovely War, whilst "Evil" features backwards elements and a country and western snippet. "Lenny and Terence" has been described as resembling "Ministry covering Black Sabbath," and Bob's vocals on the song are laden with audio effects.

"The Music That Nobody Likes" and "Mid-Day Crisis", the couplet of tracks that follow the record's intro track "2 Million Years B.C.", were described by Hot Press as a "double whammy opening attack" which immediately introduce the duo's new direction. The magazine felt that both songs were driven by metal guitar that was as indebted to the rock scene in Seattle as it was to the duo's native South London. Although "Lean On Me I Won't Fall Over" is closer to the duo's typical musical style, it nonetheless features a live drummer and a skipping piano loop. Simon Rueben of The Line of Best Fit described the song as "a rolling melody, heaving song of piano and pregnant pauses."

=== Lyrics ===
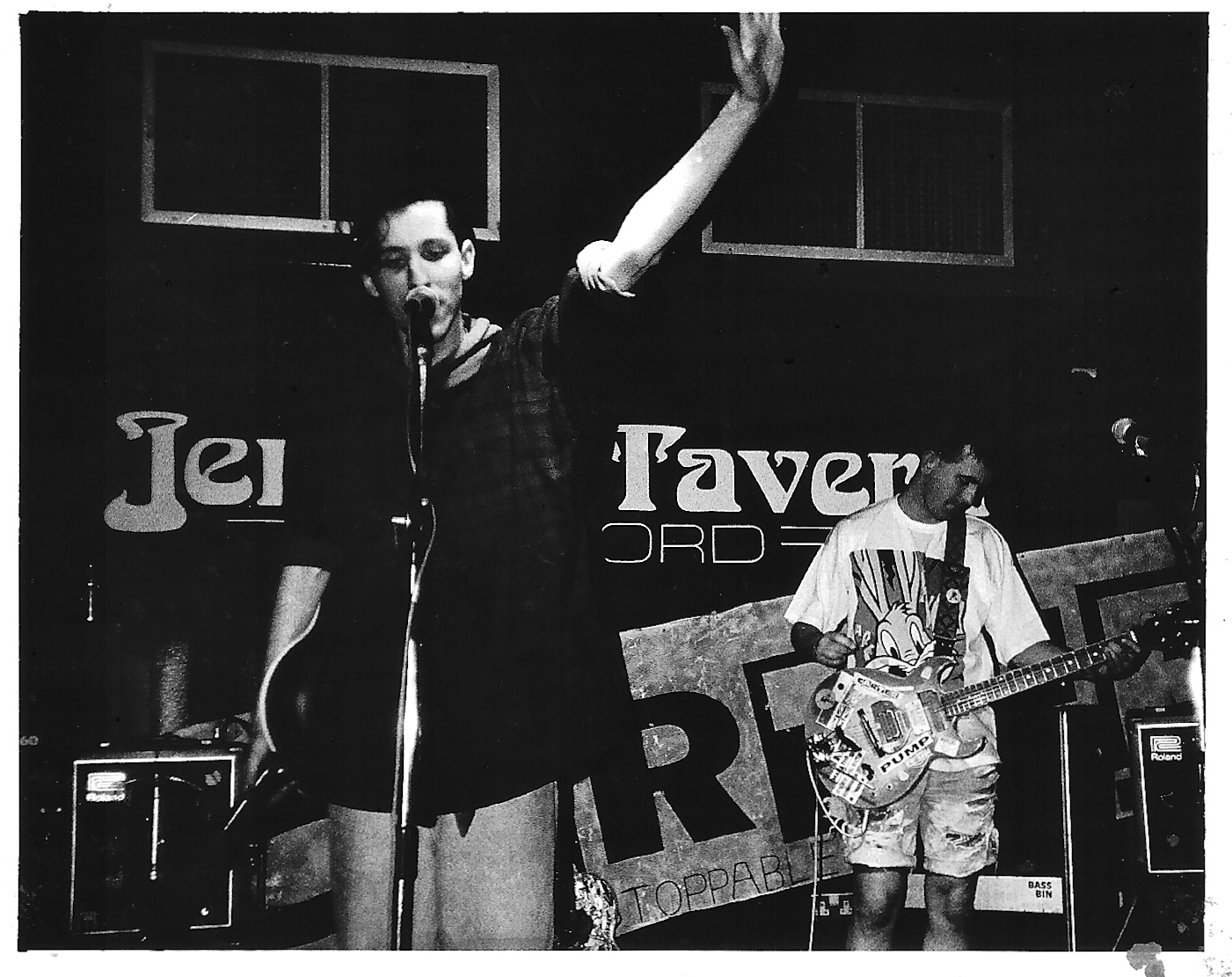
Jim Bob (pictured left) wrote more personal lyrics for Post Historic Monsters.

Although the duo's characteristic usage of puns and "twisted cliches" feature in the album's lyrics, the record nonetheless offers "some straightforward, succinct observations," with several songs being more introspective than before and tackling personal subjects. One review described the lyrics as showing the duo "railing in highly amusing dudgeon at fascists, political strife, war, ethnic cleansing, moral collapse, royal celebrations, racists, unnamed people you would have to be English to recognize, pop stars, pop songs and a whole lot more." There are only three references to London on the album, much less than on previous albums. "A Bachelor for Baden Powell", about a young boy's attempt to avoid the "roving hands of his scoutmaster", is among the personal songs, based on an incident that happened to Bob as a child. Bob wrote the song as "almost a joke", explaining "the whole thing seemed pretty funny to me. Maybe it was some kind of relief. Until I wrote that song, I hadn't told anyone. And the way I chose to tell someone was by telling absolutely everyone. I had to broadcast it."

"Suicide Isn't Painless" refers to Richey Edwards of Manic Street Preachers and denounces how he would exploit his own mental health problems in the music press, whilst "Lenny and Terence" criticises the fetishisation of retro musical styles in the music of rock musician Lenny Kravitz and soul singer Terence Trent D'Arby. "The Music That Nobody Likes", which asks "the imponderable", is about the rise of the extreme right and features lyrics such as "If love is the answer / What was the question / And can it cure my indigestion?". "Mid Day Crisis" is about "David Koresh's wayward Wacko adventures." "Travis" pays 'psychotic' homage to Robert De Niro's anti-hero character Travis Bickle from the film Taxi Driver, whilst "Under The Thumb And Over The Moon" is an unashamedly saccharine love song dedicated by Bob to his wife.

The controversial "Commercial Fucking Suicide Part 1" was omitted from UK editions but added to American editions as a bonus track. Trouser Press, describing the song's lyrics, wrote: "[A]fter calling Michael Jackson a liar and noting that Bono is not 'the new messiah,' Jim Bob blurts out, "'f you buy this record today / It's not true what the advertisements say / Your life won't be greatly improved / But Christ you've got nothing to lose / And we've got so much to gain.' Honesty — what a sick concept. Perhaps significantly, the song was added to the US edition and omitted from the UK."

== Release and promotion ==
The album was preceded by the single "Lean On Me I Won't Fall Over". Unlike many CD singles at the time, the CD release of the former single was only issued with one track listing, as opposed to two-part "CD1" and "CD2" singles sold separately, and featured a message in its liner notes reading "Part One in a one part pack." It reached number 16 in the UK Singles Chart, with its sales almost entirely being within the first week. Post Historic Monsters was released on 6 September 1993 by Chrysalis Records. In the United States, the album was released by both Chrysalis and I.R.S. Records. Upon release, the album entered and peaked at number 5 on the UK Albums Chart, a decline on the number 1 peak achieved by 1992 and the beginning of the band's declining fortunes, although it is their second highest-charting album. Ned Raggett of Allmusic felt the album's lesser success than 1992: The Love Album was due to it becoming "lost in the post-grunge fallout."

"From fourth album Post Historic Monsters onwards, it is true to say that despite increasing in band members, fandom was on the decline – but they still had the songs."

— Simon Rueben of The Line of Best Fit.

Releasing "Lenny and Terence" as the album's second single was considered a gamble, and a "hell of a risk" in the words of Deadline magazine; Bob predicted that the release of the single would "destroy everything we've built up–everything–in one blow. I mean, it's not even the version that appears on the album. We've re-recorded it and made it substantially less radio playable." Fruitbat said "it's a good test. The thing is, if all the people who bought 'Lean on Me' the week it came out do the same with Lenny and Terence, Top of the Pops will have to consider putting us on. It could ruin our careers, but it's well worth doing." The single was not much of a commercial success, only managing to reach number 40 on the UK Singles Chart.

The duo were interviewed in a dinosaur museum, in reference to the album title and cover, on BBC music show The O-Zone; the interview has been named one of "the 12 most awkward music interviews on children's television." When asked by Philippa Forrester during the interview if the album title was inspired by the publicity surrounding Jurassic Park at the time, the duo said jokingly replied it was a "cheap cash-in". Bob joked that he was not put-off in changing the title because of the film except when magazine covers featured promises of "no dinosaurs", which he declared "a bit of an advertising problem." The interview became so subdued to a point where a caption appeared on screen saying "Carter found it difficult to talk about their new single – so we asked an easier question."

In late 1993 and early 1994, the duo promoted the album with a tour which mostly played around the UK and Europe. Real Gone, describing the duo's performance at Tonbridge Angel Centre on 21 October, said "the very idea that this band would venture into the middle of Kent and play a show in a leisure centre seems like a visit from music royalty." Bob wore a shirt reading "I hate peanuts!", in reference to a KP advert using one of the duo's best-known tracks.

== Critical reception and legacy ==
Professional ratings
Review scores
Source	Rating
AllMusic	3/5 stars
Encyclopedia of Popular Music	4/5 stars
Hot Press	9/12
Trouser Press	(favourable)

Post Historic Monsters was released to favourable reviews by music critics, who praised the band's new approaches. Bob noted that "a lot of the journalists who have put the boot into us have had to admit that they like this album. Or at least some of it." Stuart Clark of Hot Press said "there's a definite feeling that Carter are trying to prove that they're more than a couple of silly haircuts and a hyperactive beatbox. Don't go expecting any radical transformations - there are no string sections or girlie backing vocals here, mate! - but, in their own sweet New Cross way, Carter have managed to combine born again maturity with the reckless sense of abandon that has always been their most endearing trademark." The review said that even the songs which "diehard fans minght regard as 'vintage Carter'" are still able to "pull themselves free of the post-punk rut that the lads started falling into on their 30 Something and 1992 albums."

Retrospective reviews have also been favourable. Stewart Mason of Allmusic rated the album three stars out of five, a less favourable score than those awarded by the website to the band's previous albums. Mason said that the album was "a solid but somewhat hectoring album" which "is a bit wearying to listen to." Trouser Press were favourable to the album, praising the back-to-basics lyrical approach and the musical style, and described the songs on the album which diverge from that style as "a few usefully contrasting digressions." Deadline said the album was band's "strongest LP" since 101 Damnations, commenting that it "recaptures the anger and the frustration, the all-round urgency, of their debut." In the 2011 edition of Colin Larkin's book Encyclopedia of Popular Music, Larkin rated the album four stars out of five, one of three albums by the duo to receive the rating.

At the end of 1993, NME ranked the album at number 22 in its list of the top 50 "Albums of the Year," whilst Select ranked the album at number 46 in their own list of the year's 50 best albums. On 13 November 2009, the band played the album live in its entirety alongside 1992: The Love Album at the Kentish Town Forum, London, as part of their "The Drum Machine Years" tour, something they had never previously done. The performance included a "cheeky Take That-style costume change."

== Track listing ==
1. "2 Million Years B.C." - 0:40
2. "The Music That Nobody Likes" - 4:27
3. "Mid Day Crisis" - 3:55
4. "Cheer Up, It Might Never Happen" - 4:05
5. "Stuff the Jubilee!" - 3:54
6. "A Bachelor for Baden Powell" - 3:55
7. "Spoilsports Personality of the Year" - 5:03
8. "Suicide Isn't Painless" - 1:18
9. "Being Here" - 2:04
10. "Evil" - 2:50
11. "Sing Fat Lady Sing" - 3:34
12. "Travis" - 3:03
13. "Lean on Me I Won't Fall Over" - 3:40
14. "Lenny and Terence" - 3:55
15. "Under the Thumb and Over the Moon" - 3:43

The above listing shows the UK tracks; the USA album version included a different mix of "Lenny and Terence", plus the B-side "Commercial Fucking Suicide, Pt. 1"

== Personnel ==
- Jim "Jim Bob" Morrison - vocals, guitar
- Les "Fruitbat" Carter - vocals, guitar, keys
- Sex Machine - producer
- Simon Painter - producer, engineer
- Kevin Metcalf - mastering (at the Townhouse)
- Carter / Flashing Blade - sleeve design
