= In a Big Flash Car on a Saturday Night =

Studio album by Jim's Super Stereoworld
- Released: 2002
- Label: Ten Forty Sound

Professional ratings
Review scores
Source	Rating
AllMusic	4/5 stars
Drowned in Sound	8/10

In a Big Flash Car on a Saturday Night is a solo album by the former Carter USM singer/guitarist Jim Bob, released with the "Jim's Super Stereoworld" nickname in 2002. A fellow Carter USM member, Fruitbat, is credited in the album's liner notes as shouting on "Big Flash Car" and "Heads Will Rock".

== Critical reception ==
AllMusic called the album "alternately infectious, tasteless, full of grace, and spectacularly absurd". Drowned in Sound wrote that "like all things pop, it is designed to be disposable, almost transparent, yet produced with immaculate care and of hidden depths".

== Track listing ==
1. Heads Will Rock
2. Young Dumb (And Full Of Fun)
3. Big Flash Car
4. Jim's Mobile Disco
5. Hey Kenny
6. Mission Control
7. Candy Floss
8. Tight Pants
9. Happier Times

== Personnel ==
- Jim Bob
- Fruitbat, on some tracks
