= 101 Damnations (album) =

Studio album by Carter the Unstoppable Sex Machine
- Released: 15 January 1990
- Studios: Important Notice, Mitcham, South London
- Genres: Punk rock; glam rock
- Length: 41:31
- Label: Big Cat
- Producers: Sex Machine, Simon Painter

Carter the Unstoppable Sex Machine chronology
| 101 Damnations (1990) | 30 Something (1991) |

Singles from 101 Damnations
- 1. "Sheriff Fatman" Released: November 1989

101 Damnations is the debut studio album by English rock band Carter the Unstoppable Sex Machine, released on 15 January 1990 through Big Cat Records. After playing in different bands, James Robert "Jim Bob" Morrison and Les "Fruitbat" Carter formed Bob and played their first show in August 1987, before changing the name to Carter the Unstoppable Sex Machine. Over the next year, they played various shows across London before signing to Big Cat; with shows further north of the city in early 1989, a fanbase started building. The duo recorded their debut album with producer Simon Painter at Important Notice Studios, which was a garage on Painter's property, in Mitcham, South London. 101 Damnations is a punk rock and glam rock album that merges the styles of David Bowie and Pet Shop Boys, alongside loud guitars, drum machines and samples taken from films and TV shows.

101 Damnations was met with generally favourable reviews, with critics praising the songwriting; it peaked at number 29 on the UK Albums Chart. After recording, Carter the Unstoppable Sex Machine toured the United Kingdom until the end of 1989. During that time, "Sheriff Fatman" was released as the album's sole single in November 1989, peaking at number 23 in the UK Singles Chart. The band was also associated with the grebo scene alongside Ned's Atomic Dustbin and Pop Will Eat Itself. In the first half of 1990, the band toured the UK and mainland Europe twice each, and later tour throughout June and July 1990 to promote their non-album single "Rubbish". 101 Damnations was included at number 29 on the NME list of the year's best releases, and would be reissued several times in the ensuing years.

== Background ==
After completing his education, James Robert "Jim Bob" Morrison got a job at an advertising firm in London's West End. During this time, he formed Jeepster, which went two years before playing their first gig. Although that was the band's only show, Bob left his job to focus on music. While performing with the Ballpoints, Bob came across bassist Les "Fruitbat" Carter of Dead Clergy at the rehearsal space The Orchestra Pit in Streatham, South London in 1979. When the bassist for the Ballpoints left, Fruitbat took his role. Following a name change to Peter Pan's Playground, the band split and the members pursued different projects, including busking, children's entertainment and solo careers. Bob formed Jamie Wednesday, while Fruitbat used the moniker Cartoon Carter; the pair separately wrote several songs that would later be re-worked for their next project. After obtaining a drum machine, Bob and Fruitbat played their first show in August 1987 under the name Bob, supporting the Men They Couldn't Hang at the Astoria venue in London.

Jamie Wednesday was initially billed to play that show, but had broken up shortly before, leaving Bob and Fruitbat with one week to write new material. They composed six songs, namely, "Everytime a Churchbell Rings", "An All American National Sport", "The Taking of Peckham 123", "Good Grief Charlie Brown", an early version of "A Perfect Day to Drop the Bomb" titled "Will I Go to Hell If I Kiss in Front of Jesus" and "G.I. Blues". The band needed backing tracks for the show; they saw a local advertisement in a newspaper for Important Notice Studios in Mitcham, owned by engineer Simon Painter, which they used to make said tracks. The duo then played another show two weeks later, before changing their name to Carter the Unstoppable Sex Machine after learning of another band called Bob. The pair debuted this new name at a show at The Sir George Robey in September 1987, and closed out the year with three more gigs across London.

== Development and recording ==
Between February and November 1988, Carter the Unstoppable Sex Machine played further shows throughout London; as Fruitbat was unable to pass his driver's test, they were forced to use buses to travel to their gigs. During this period, Adrian Boss became their manager, and subsequently, their driver of hired cars. They recorded demos at Important Notice Studios, which earned them their first recording contract with Big Cat Records; the label released their debut single "A Sheltered Life" in October 1988. The band started playing shows further north in early 1989, which was around the time Bob noticed that they were starting to attract a fanbase. The Treworgey Tree Fayre in Cornwall in summer 1989 marked the band's first festival appearance, ending with them not being paid.

Carter the Unstoppable Sex Machine recorded their debut album at Important Notice Studios; the band and Painter acted as producers. They initially wanted Jah Wobble to produce it, though Bob could not recall why he did not. The studio was located in the back garden of Painter's residence near a council estate. The band would regularly cycle to-and-from the building each day; Bob referred to the studio's size as a "garage ... [and] when I say a garage, I doubt you could have kept much more than say, a Smart car or something Noddy might drive in there". When they had used the space to make their earlier demos, it initially had an eight-track recorder and charged £8 per hour, but by the time the band were making the album, it upgraded to 16-tracks and £16 per hour. They collectively spent £800 recording it; as they did not own a sampler, snippets of TV shows, films and news broadcasts were added to the recordings via a pair of cassette decks. When Bob asked Painter on how to achieve a megaphone sound for "Sheriff Fatman", he performed what he wanted by cupping his hands over his mouth, to which Painter remarked, "do that".

== Music and lyrics ==
=== Overview ===
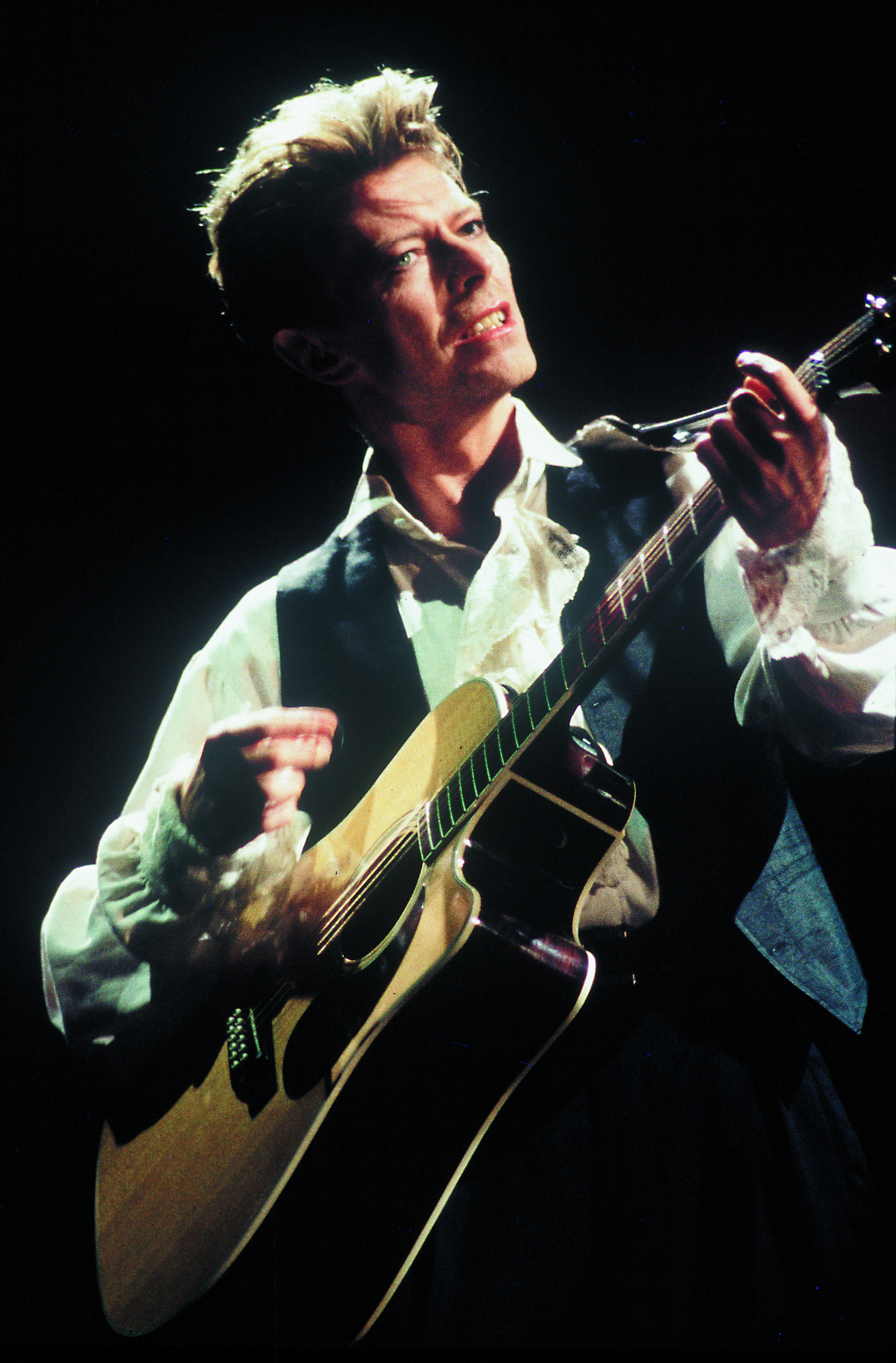
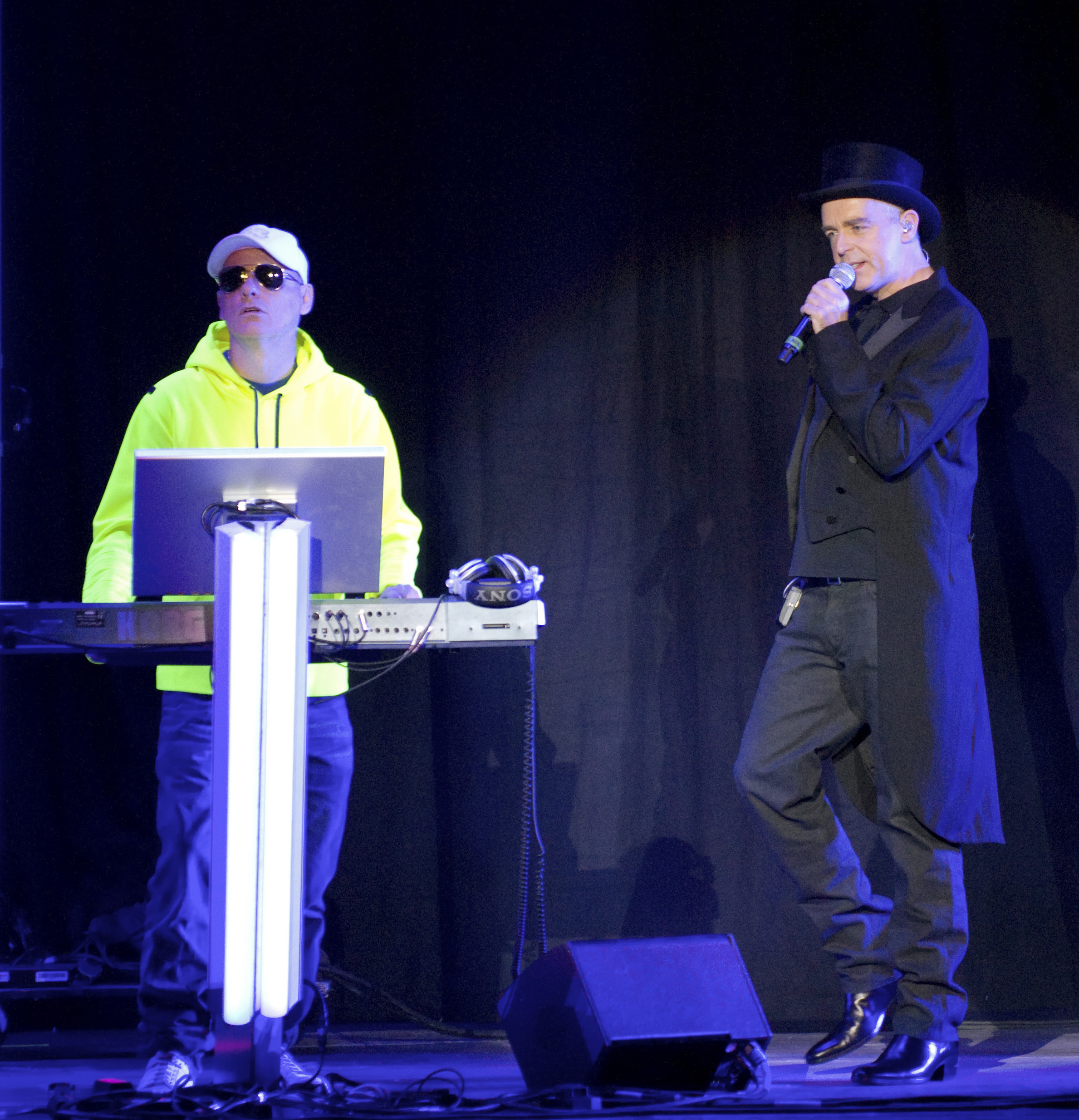
The music on 101 Damnations has been described as a mixture of the work of David Bowie (left) and Pet Shop Boys (right).

101 Damnations incorporates drum machines, samples and loud guitars, employing extensive cultural references and puns, while being lyrically concerned with real life events seen in the news. Ned Raggett of AllMusic characterised the album's musical style as "brash, quick, punk/glam via rough early eighties technology pump-it-up pogoers" and described the heavy usage of puns as "Carter's calling card as much as anything". Gavin Stoker in The Rough Guide to Rock wrote that it combined "frantic guitars with samples, hip-hop beats, keyboard blasts and lyrics that namechecked south London haunts with alarming regularity". James Muretich of Calgary Herald considered it to be a mix of the work of David Bowie and Pet Shop Boys "while adopting the literary, politically appropriate, socially sarcastic British pop intellectual stance".

In a review for NME, DJ Steve Lamacq described the lyrics as being adaptive of other media mediums: "the colour and atmospheric backdrops (film), the plot and the dialogue (comics) and the descriptive prowess (if Carter were a book, they'd be a Martin Millar novel - really)". The planned title for the album was The Brothels of Streatham to the Taking of Peckham, and later after signing, they attempted to call it Cunt. Bob cites Tom Waits and the Band of Holy Joy as being inspirations for his songwriting, in particular on "The Taking of Peckham 123". Explaining the samples, Bob said he would be sat next to a TV or a radio and recording bits using a cassette recorder for useable portions. As Fruitbat owned a copy of the film Head (1968), they extensively took samples from it for the album, most prominently on "A Perfect Day to Drop the Bomb".

=== Tracks ===
Bob said "The Road to Domestos", the album's opener, was a recording of a hymn they had stolen, ending with the sound of machine gun fire. The title of the following track, "Everytime a Church Bell Rings", was influenced by the film It's a Wonderful Life (1946). "Twenty Four Minutes to Tulse Hill" details a train ride through South London; the train announcer snippets were recorded at the Tulse Hill railway station, which Fruitbat lived across from. It also features a sample taken from Quadrophenia (1979), which had influenced Bob. "An All-American National Sport", which had gone under the titles "Digging a Hole" and "Cardboard City Cut-Out" with different publishers, discusses a homeless person being set on fire by two strangers. "Sheriff Fatman" was highlighted as displaying the album's characteristic sound; Raggett said "the song itself may be about a total rat-bastard of a slumlord, but the name of the game is energy and fun." Bob said the titular character was a landlord from South London, and was based on two people whom he knew personally. An earlier version of the track was known as "Chuckles and Smiles", and was adapted from "Jonathan Jo" (1924) by A. A. Milne.

"The Taking of Peckham 123" is largely about the Peckham area of London, where Jamie Wednesday's label The Pink Label was based. Bob has compared the song to "Evelyn" (1987) by contemporaries Pop Will Eat Itself. "Crimestoppers A' Go Go" is an instrumental track that is followed by "Good Grief Charlie Brown", which is about Bob's parents divorcing, and sees him reciting marriage vows in the style of a vicar by its conclusion. HuffPost writer Tom Thornton said "Midnight on the Murder Mile" served as a "depiction of a paranoid, post-nightclub cross-borough trudge home". Its title refers to a length of road dubbed the Murder Mile where Bob would walk from a bus stop in West Norwood to his residence in Crystal Palace. It features samples of the band ringing and hanging up on the emergency phone number 999 and fight sounds from The Firm (1989) during the instrumental portion. "A Perfect Day to Drop the Bomb", which begins with a clip of an Atari ST booting up, reuses the hook from "The Message" (1982) by Grandmaster Flash and the Furious Five. The album's closing track, "G.I. Blues", is an anti-war song inspired by John Savage's character in The Deer Hunter (1978), which had left an impression on Bob. Rob Sheridan plays the piano solo in the track; Bob said he was drafted in as the part was a "lot harder to play than it sounds" and he performed it "too well so we had to change it after he’d left the studio".

== Release ==
Carter the Unstoppable Sex Machine embarked on a four-month long tour of the UK between September and December 1989. During this time, "Sheriff Fatman" was released as the lead single from their upcoming debut album in November 1989. It was originally released as a 12-inch vinyl record, with the B-sides "R.S.P.C.E.", "Twin Tub with Guitar" and a cover of "Everybody's Happy Nowadays" (1979) by Buzzcocks. The music video for "Sheriff Fatman" consists of live footage of the band with close-up shots of their instruments and the crowd. 101 Damnations was released on 15 January 1990 through Big Cat Records, with distribution from Rough Trade Records. The artwork consists of 56 black spots against a white background, while the title is a reference to the film One Hundred and One Dalmatians (1961). At the time of its release, the duo were associated with the grebo scene alongside Ned's Atomic Dustbin and Pop Will Eat Itself. Stoker said that "as the rest of the country looked towards the 'Madchester' scene, Carter were starting a riot down south";

Carter the Unstoppable Sex Machine promoted 101 Damnations with a UK tour until mid-February 1990, when they embarked on their first tour of mainland Europe, consisting of three shows in Holland. Upon returning home, the band continued to tour the UK until April 1990, and followed this up with a longer stint in Europe. On the latter trek, some of the crowd in Germany were not fond of the band lacking a drummer, often asking "where's the drummer?", with a few of them thinking the pair were miming the entire time. On one occasion, an attendee tried to go behind the stage, expecting to find a drummer there. The non-album single "Rubbish" was released in June 1990, with the B-sides "Alternative Alf Garnett" and a cover of Pet Shop Boys' "Rent" (1987). Preceded by a launch party in Kentish Town, it was promoted with a UK tour throughout June and July 1990, ending with a performance at the Astoria.

=== Reissues and related events ===
"Sheriff Fatman" was reissued in 1991 through Big Cat and Chrysalis Records. The two labels reissued 101 Damnations in the UK on 8 August 1991 and in the United States five days later. Big Cat Records reissued it in 2004, and then in 2011 with additional tracks; the latter edition was re-printed in 2018. It was re-pressed on vinyl in 2018 as part of the box set The Studio Recordings 1988–1998, alongside their other albums. "Sheriff Fatman", "Rubbish" and their respective B-sides were included on the compilation Handbuilt by Perverts (1990); "Sheriff Fatman" and "Rubbish" were then featured on the compilations Straw Donkey... The Singles (1995) and Anytime, Anyplace, Anywhere ...The Very Best of Carter USM (2000). In addition to those two tracks, "Twenty Four Minutes from Tulse Hill", "Midnight on the Murder Mile", "A Perfect Day to Drop the Bomb" and "G.I. Blues" were included on the anthology compilation You Fat Bastard (2007). In 2009, the band performed their first four albums in their entireties across two shows in London, which included 101 Damnations. That performance and the performance of their second album 30 Something (1991) were released as a two-CD set under the title The Drum Machine Years Volume 1 (1990–1991) (2010) through Concert Live.

== Reception ==
Professional ratings
Review scores
| Source | Rating |
|---|---|
| AllMusic | 4.5/5 stars |
| Calgary Herald | C+ |
| The Encyclopedia of Popular Music | 4/5 stars |
| NME | 8/10 |
| Record Collector | 3/5 stars |
| Record Mirror | 4/5 |

Reviewers generally praised the songwriting found on 101 Damnations. In a retrospective piece, Raggett said in the "duo's own unusual way, Carter were something of a unique and thrilling prospect at its best, which the highlights of Damnations show." Trouser Press writer Ira Robbins called it a "fully realised debut" and "mind-blowing in the most stimulating sense"; Stoke was similarly impressed that the band "had ideas and energy to spare". Colin Larkin in The Encyclopedia of Popular Music said that the album was an "invocative melting pot of samples, ideas and tunes" delivered with "a punk-inspired ethos". Muretich said it was: "Clever, yes. Contrived, yes. And that's where this London bridge between social criticism and music falls down. Not enough melodic muscle, lyrical gusto". The staff at NME remarked that it was "weighted with a constant stream of clever touches, a sensible line in cynicism and a streak of humour". In Artforum, veteran critic Greil Marcus described 101 Damnations as "the noisiest and smartest record I’ve heard since early Wire—and more hysterical, in both senses of the word."

Other critics were drawn to its sound quality. Lamacq considered it the band's "(Tooting) Broadway debut, a big screen collage on a shoestring budget - rough-edged Rascal Pop with a searching script". Associated Press writer David Bauder said that the album was the "aural equivalent of a horror movie, an unrelenting series of word pictures of a society gone mad"; however, he noted that there was "only so much of this" he could hear, suggesting that "most listeners will simply shudder and move out of the neighborhood". Record Collector's Jonathan Scott wrote in a 2011 review that the band were the "most interesting" of their contemporaries, saying that their music featured "both a naïve, DIY charm and a rousing anthemic quality".

101 Damnations peaked at number 29 on the UK Albums Chart. The reissue of "Sheriff Fatman" peaked at number 23 in the UK Singles Chart. At the end of 1990, NME ranked it at number 29 in their list of the top 50 release of the year. In 1992, NME included it in their list of the 20 best debut albums, writing that it stood in contrast to the Madchester boom of early 1990 by "[capturing] Carter's live resilience and ability to translate punk's social awareness into a new pop phenomenon", while also praising its DIY qualities. In The Rough Guide to Rock, Stoker commented that 101 Damnations bolstered Carter the Unstoppable Sex Machine's reputation as "inventive agit-popsters".

== Track listing ==
All tracks written by James Morrison and Les Carter. Some CD versions combine the first two tracks into one.

Side one

1. "The Road to Domestos" – 0:46
2. "Everytime a Churchbell Rings" – 4:13
3. "Twenty Four Minutes from Tulse Hill" – 3:26
4. "An All American National Sport" – 3:55
5. "Sheriff Fatman" – 4:43
6. "The Taking of Peckham 123" – 4:22

Side two

7. "Crimestoppers A' Go Go" – 2:48
8. "Good Grief Charlie Brown" – 3:39
9. "Midnight on the Murder Mile" – 3:30
10. "A Perfect Day to Drop the Bomb" – 5:42
11. "G.I. Blues" – 3:57

== Personnel ==
Personnel per booklet.

Musicians

- Jim Bob – performer
- Fruitbat – performer
- Rob Sheridan – piano solo ("G.I. Blues")

Production and design

- Sex Machine – producer
- Simon Painter – producer, engineer
- Carter – sleeve design
- Dee Eff – sleeve design

== Charts ==
Chart performance for 101 Damnations
| Chart (1991) | Peak position |
|---|---|
| Australian Albums (ARIA) | 185 |
| UK Albums Chart | 29 |

== See also ==
- Liquidizer – the 1989 debut album by contemporaries Jesus Jones, known for its heavy use of samples
