= Straw Donkey... The Singles =

Compilation album by Carter the Unstoppable Sex Machine
- Released: 2 October 1995
- Label: Chrysalis

Carter the Unstoppable Sex Machine chronology
Worry Bomb (1995)	Straw Donkey... The Singles (1995)	A World Without Dave (1997)

Singles from Straw Donkey
- 1. "Born on the 5th of November" Released: 18 September 1995

Professional ratings
Review scores
Source	Rating
AllMusic	link
Alternative Press	5/5 stars

Straw Donkey... The Singles is a music album by Carter the Unstoppable Sex Machine. Released on Chrysalis Records. The album is a compilation of singles by the band, some of which were not previously released in an album. One single was issued from the album: "Born on the 5th of November".

== Track listing ==
1. "A Sheltered Life" – 4:03
2. "Sheriff Fatman" – 4:43
3. "Rubbish" – 3:05
4. "Anytime Anyplace Anywhere" – 4:09
5. "Bloodsport for All" – 5:03
6. "After the Watershed (Early Learning the Hard Way)" – 4:27
7. "The Only Living Boy in New Cross" – 3:55
8. "Do Re Me So Far So Good" – 3:05
9. "The Impossible Dream" – 5:15
10. "Lean on Me I Won't Fall Over" – 3:41
11. "Lenny and Terence" – 3:55
12. "Glam Rock Cops" – 3:42
13. "Let's Get Tattoos" – 2:48
14. "The Young Offender's Mum" – 3:36
15. "Born on the 5th of November" – 11:22
