= After the Watershed (Early Learning the Hard Way) =

Single by Carter the Unstoppable Sex Machine

from the album Straw Donkey... The Singles
- Released: 5 October 1991
- Recorded: 1990
- Genre: Alternative rock; alternative dance
- Length: 4:00
- Label: Chrysalis
- Songwriters: Morrison, Carter, Richards and Jagger

Carter the Unstoppable Sex Machine singles chronology
"Sheriff Fatman" (1989)	"After the Watershed (Early Learning the Hard Way)" (1991)	"The Only Living Boy In New Cross" (1991)

"After the Watershed" is a 1991 single by Carter the Unstoppable Sex Machine. Although never featured on any original album by the band, it is included on several later compilations.

The Rolling Stones took a dim view of the unauthorised use of their lyrics, - the refrain "Goodbye, Ruby Tuesday" - in the song's chorus, and took out an injunction which forced the song from the radio.

The song is memorable as being performed at the Smash Hits Poll Winners Party of 1991, when Fruitbat rugby tackled Phillip Schofield on live TV after his reference to Carter's instrument-smashing performance lacking originality.

== Meaning ==
The title of the song refers to the watershed time period, enforced on British television by the ITC (now Ofcom). Adult content cannot be broadcast before the 9 p.m. "watershed", in an attempt to prevent adult content being available to younger audiences.

"Early Learning the Hard Way" is a portmanteau phrase combining the Early Learning Centre and the British English idiom "the hard way".

The song also refers to the conspiracy theorist David Icke, stating "David Icke said, he'd like to show us how, to love us back to life again now".

== Composition ==
The song uses lyrics from the song Ruby Tuesday through the lyrics "Goodbye Ruby Tuesday, come home you silly cow", it also uses the bass riff from Satisfaction. Following legal action by The Rolling Stones, the track is now credited to Morrison, Carter, Richards and Jagger.

== Track listings ==
- CD USMCD1 12" VINYL ABB100T
1. "After the Watershed (Early Learning the Hard Way)"
2. The 90's Revival
3. A Nation Of Shoplifters
4. This Is How It Feels

== Charts ==
Chart (1991/92)	Peak position
Australia (ARIA)	124
UK Singles (Official Charts)	11
