= I Blame the Government =

Studio album by Carter the Unstoppable Sex Machine
- Released: January 1998
- Recorded: 1997
- Genre: Alternative dance, alternative rock
- Label: Cooking Vinyl
- Producer: Carter the Unstoppable Sex Machine and Simon Painter

Carter the Unstoppable Sex Machine chronology
| A World Without Dave (1997) | I Blame the Government (1998) |

Professional ratings
Review scores
| Source | Rating |
|---|---|
| AllMusic | 3.5/5 stars |
| NME | 3/10 |

I Blame the Government is the final studio album by Carter the Unstoppable Sex Machine. It was released on Cooking Vinyl Records in 1998, and reached #92 on the UK charts.

It was originally conceived as a double album, but Carter guitarist Les "Fruitbat" Carter felt double albums were a chore in general to listen through from start to finish, so the plan was scrapped. The album was recorded with a seven-member line-up rather than just a two-member line-up which they had used on their early recordings. Many of the songs released on the album were demo versions, recorded in Fruitbat’s home studio and not final studio recordings, as the band had split up before they had completed work on the album. Carter decided not to scrap the material but rather to release it as it stood.

It is the only Carter album not to see any singles released from it, although Fruitbat has stated that he felt there were a couple of songs that could have been singles had the band not split before its release.

== Critical reception ==
Dave Thompson, in Alternative Rock, wrote that "the lyrics once again shine with punchy wit and the frantically guitar-driven music recaptures their old madcap pop flair."

== Track listing ==
All songs written by Morrison/Carter

1. "The Wrong Place at the Wrong Time" - 0:55
2. "23:59 End of the World" - 3:41
3. "Sunshine" - 3:36
4. "The Undertaker and the Hippy Protest Singer" - 3:03
5. "Sweetheart Sugar Baby" - 4:41
6. "Growing Old Disgracefully" - 3:15
7. "The Man Who Bought the World" - 4:40
8. "Winning the War" - 3:14
9. "I Blame the Government" - 3:19
10. "Citizen's Band Radio" - 4:08
11. "Psycho Bill" - 2:50
12. "Closedown" - 3:27
13. "Girls Can Keep a Secret" - 4:35

== Credits ==
The album was produced by Carter USM and Simon Painter. It was recorded at Notice Studios, House In The Woods and at Chateau Fruitbat.

- Jim "Jim Bob" Morrison - vocals, guitar
- Les "Fruitbat" Carter - vocals, guitar, keyboards
- Wez - drums
- Salv - bass
- Steve - guitar
- Ben Lambert - keyboards
- Simon Painter - producer, engineer, piano, guitar, backing vocals
- Simon Milton - assistant engineer
