= Worry Bomb =

Studio album by Carter the Unstoppable Sex Machine
- Released: 6 February 1995
- Studio: The Manor (Oxfordshire, England)
- Genre: Punk rock; alternative dance; alternative rock
- Length: 58:16
- Label: Chrysalis Records
- Producer: Carter USM; Simon Painter

Carter the Unstoppable Sex Machine chronology
Starry Eyed and Bollock Naked (1994)	Worry Bomb (1995)	Straw Donkey... The Singles (1995)

Singles from Worry Bomb
- 1. "Let's Get Tattoos" Released: 7 November 1994; 2. "Young Offender's Mum" Released: 23 January 1995

Professional ratings
Review scores
Source	Rating
AllMusic	4/5 stars
Smash Hits	4/5 stars

Worry Bomb is the fifth studio album by English indie rock band Carter the Unstoppable Sex Machine, released in 1995. It reached number nine on the UK Albums Chart. It included a limited-edition CD of the live show Doma Sportova...Live at Zagreb, recorded on 20 May 1994.

It was the first Carter USM album to feature new drummer Wez. Formerly of the band International Resque, he replaced the trusty drum machine which was the mainstay of their previous recordings.

As a result of this, the album marked a shift away from the characteristic sound of their previous records, and instead saw the group veer from full-on punk rock ("Airplane Food/Airplane Fast Food"), to more experimental sounds (the title track), and more downtempo ballads ("Ceasefire").

== Critical reception ==
Alternative Rock wrote that "Worry Bomb explodes in all directions at once, a breathless bonanza of true punk."

== Track listing ==
1. "Cheap 'n' Cheesy"
2. "Airplane Food/Airplane Fast Food"
3. "Young Offender's Mum"
4. "Gas (Man)"
5. "Life And Soul Of Party Dies"
6. "My Defeatist Attitude"
7. "Worry Bomb"
8. "Senile Delinquent"
9. "Me And Mr Jones"
10. "Let's Get Tattoos"
11. "Going Straight"
12. "God Saint Peter And The Guardian Angel"
13. "Only Looney Left In Town"
14. "Ceasefire"

=== Doma Sportova...Live At Zagreb track listing ===
1. "Alternative Alf Garnett"
2. "Do Re Me So Far So Good"
3. "Bachelor For Baden Powell"
4. "Re Educating Rita"
5. "Only Living Boy In New Cross"
6. "Lean On Me I Won't Fall Over"
7. "Granny Farming In The UK"
8. "Travis"
9. "Sing Fat Lady Sing"
10. "Lenny And Terence"
11. "Commercial Fucking Suicide"

== Personnel ==
- Jim "Jim Bob" Morrison – vocals, guitar
- Les "Fruitbat" Carter – guitar, bass, vocals, keys, programming
- Wez – drums
- Sex Machine – producer
- Simon Painter – producer
- Steve 'Barney' Chase – engineer
- Mark Hayley – assistant engineer
- Paul Walton – assistant engineer
- Dave Garnish – assistant engineer
- Kevin Metcalf – mastering (at the Townhouse)
