= 30 Something =

Studio album by Carter the Unstoppable Sex Machine
- Released: 18 February 1991
- Recorded: 1990
- Studio: Important Notice Studios, South London
- Genre: Alternative dance; grebo; punk rock
- Label: Rough Trade; Capitol; EMI; Nettwerk
- Producer: Sex Machine; Simon Painter

Carter the Unstoppable Sex Machine chronology
101 Damnations (1990)	30 Something (1991)	1992 – The Love Album (1992)

Singles from 30 Something
- 1. "Anytime Anyplace Anywhere" Released: October 1990; 2. "Bloodsport For All" Released: January 1991

30 Something is the second album by Carter the Unstoppable Sex Machine, released in 1991 on Rough Trade Records. It was recorded in 20 days on 8-track, costing only £4,000. The album was given a 10/10 review in NME, which described 30 Something as a "brilliant, bold record". It was prefaced with a single "Anytime Anyplace Anywhere", which was a major indie hit and also included on the album.

The success of the album coincided with the renewed success of the "Sheriff Fatman" single, which generated more sales. It reached number eight in the UK charts on its original release, and number 21 when re-issued in early 1992. The album was certified Gold (100,000 units sold) by the British Phonographic Industry (BPI).

The other single from the album, "Bloodsport For All", an attack on racism and bullying in the army, was released at the start of the Gulf War and was denied airplay by the BBC.

== Music and lyrics ==
An alternative dance and grebo album heavy on puns and sampling, 30 Something was described by Ned Raggett of AllMusic as being largely similar to their debut album 101 Damnations, but showing "a growing sophistication that fleshed out both sound and lyrics." He said that its primary similarity with the former album is "the typical Carter trappings still running rampant: puns explode everywhere without restraint, musical and lyrical references creep in from the Clash and David Bowie to traditional football chants, and so forth," as well as "the still cheap-and-cheery sound of the band's keyboards, drum machines and more," but said that the differences show the band "a little more comfortable in the studio here. The two are able to whip up their surging numbers to a higher level–the group's stated fondness for Queen actually makes a little more sense here, while "Billy's Smart Circus" is flawless in its soaring, anthemic power. Meanwhile, their bluer moods get more gently evocative accompaniment, often addressing getting addicted to the bottle and the unfortunate results."

Opening instrumental "Surfin' USM" opens with a sampled monologue of Chris Barrie in character as Rimmer in Red Dwarf Series 3 episode "Bodyswap" talking about getting fat with age–described by Raggett as "a great snippet about what growing old really means". It then gives way to a crowd chanting "You Fat Bastard", which Bob said was taken from a gig at the University of Kent. The track is an instrumental indie dance track with chainsaw guitars and a David Bowie sample. "My Second to Last Will and Testament" shows Bob "settling affairs all around, down to organ donation" with the lyrics "They can take my lungs and kidneys/But my heart belongs to Daphne." Melding genres, the song sees a similar aesthetic to the opener, although with "snarling punk vocals from Jim Bob juxtaposing with some lovely harmonising from Fruitbat. The whole thing builds to a massive chorus before ending abruptly with Jim Bob throatily yelling "...die.""

Samples of Michael Caine's character Alfie appear on several tracks.

== Critical reception ==
Professional ratings
Review scores
Source	Rating
AllMusic	4/5 stars
Classic Rock	9/10
Louder Than War	5/5
NME	10/10
Q	3/5 stars
Record Mirror	9/10
Select	3/5
Sounds	5/5 stars
Uncut	6/10
Vox	9/10

NME gave the album 10/10, saying, "This brilliant, bold record will still be among the best ten albums of the year come the end of '91: testimony to how Carter, the unlikely lads of the past two years, have nailed down their instinctive feel for pop with a hookline and a point of view."

New Internationalist, who give different ratings for different components of the albums they review, rated the album four stars out of five based on "Politics" and three stars out of five based on "Entertainment." The magazine said "1991 appears to belong to Carter. They are that rare thing, a band that wholeheartedly addresses its time, that truly belongs to it." They were very favourable towards the band's lyrics, saying "Carter's bluff, seedy ebullience is a welcome antidote to the rather fey self-regard that's dominated indie pop over the last decade, from the Jesus and Mary Chain to the current blissed-out hedonism of Happy Mondays and their baggy ilk," but did however note that "it has to be said that Carter's musical style is limited in the extreme – for the most part, a ragged thrash that happens to be played largely on sequencers rather than guitars. The music and the rasping vocals give diminishing returns – the real pleasure has to be sought in the pun-laden lyrics."

== Legacy ==
At the end of 1991, NME ranked the album at number 8 in their list of the top 50 "Albums of the Year", ahead of My Bloody Valentine's Loveless, whilst Melody Maker ranked it at number 21 in their own 1991 "End of Year Critic's List" for the top 50 albums of the year. Vox included the album in their list "Vox 50 Albums of 1991." In 2014, NME included in their list of "21 1990s Albums NME Has Given 10/10."

Recalling the era, Andrew Collins in The Guardian said:

"Carter USM were typical of the "T-shirt bands" of that epoch: witty, wily and embraced with obsessive devotion by young, gig-going fans. Jim "Jim Bob" Morrison and Leslie "Fruitbat" Carter went from Rough Trade to Chrysalis in 1992. They were unlikely pop stars, who poked fun at their own comparatively ripe old age with their second album 30 Something. Jim’s fringe resembled a front ponytail, Fruitbat wore cycling gear; neither favoured long trousers. They produced a powerpop racket with a punk-rock electric guitar, a rasping voice, a drum machine and backing tapes. Jim’s lyrical puns were enough to make a Sun headline writer retire: 24 Hours from Tulse Hill, 101 Damnations, The Only Living Boy in New Cross, Do Re Me So Far So Good. But mainstream stardom made them cross. Fruitbat rugby-tackled Phillip Schofield after a misunderstood amp-toppling finale to After the Watershed at the Smash Hits Poll Winners Party, live on TV."

== Track listing ==
All songs written and composed by Morrison and Carter, except for "Alternate Title", which was composed by Micky Dolenz and performed by The Monkees,

Side one
No.	Title	Length
1.	"Surfin' USM"	3:14
2.	"My Second to Last Will and Testament"	2:38
3.	"Anytime Anyplace Anywhere"	4:10
4.	"A Prince in a Pauper's Grave"	4:25
5.	"Shoppers' Paradise"	4:54

Side two
No.	Title	Length
6.	"Billy's Smart Circus"	4:05
7.	"Bloodsport for All"	5:05
8.	"Sealed With a Glasgow Kiss"	2:04
9.	"Say It With Flowers"	3:18
10.	"Falling on a Bruise"	5:56
11.	"The Final Comedown"	2:05

Disc two - CD bonus tracks (2012)
No.	Title	Length
1.	"Re-Educating Rita"
2.	"Alternate Title"
3.	"Randy Sarf Git"
4.	"2001: A Clockwork Orange"
5.	"Bedsitter"
6.	"Christmas Shoppers' Paradise"
7.	"Surfin' USM"
8.	"Midnight On The Murder Mile"
9.	"Rubbish"
10.	"Good Grief Charlie Brown"
11.	"My Second To Last Will And Testament"
12.	"Re-Educating Rita"
13.	"Anytime Anyplace Anywhere"
14.	"Say It With Flowers"
15.	"A Prince In A Pauper's Grave"
16.	"Sheriff Fatman"
17.	"After The Watershed"
18.	"Shoppers' Paradise"
19.	"The 90's Revival"
20.	"Bloodsport For All"
21.	"This Is How It Feels"
22.	"A Perfect Day To Drop The Bomb"

Notes (CD bonus tracks)

- 1–3 from "Anytime Anyplace Anywhere" Single (October 1990)
- 4–5 from "Bloodsport For All" Single (January 1991)
- 6 from 7" Promo Giveaway At The Town & Country Club, London (14 December 1990)
- 7–22 BBC In Concert: Live At Kilburn - 7 December 1991

== Personnel ==
- Jim "Jim Bob" Morrison – performer
- Les "Fruitbat" Carter – performer
- Sex Machine – producer
- Simon Painter – producer
- Simon Painter – engineer
- Kevin Metcalf – mastering (at the Townhouse)
- Carter – sleeve design
- Flat Earth – sleeve design
- Mark Baker – team photo
- Jon ‘Fat’ Beast – cover star (and subject of track ‘Surfing USM’)

== Charts ==
Chart (1992, 2009/10)	Peak position
Australian Albums (ARIA)	138
UK Albums Chart	8

2023 chart performance for 30 Something
Chart (2023)	Peak position
UK Independent Albums (OCC)	13

== Certifications ==
Region	Certification	Certified units/sales
United Kingdom (BPI)	Gold	100,000^{^}
^{^} Shipments figures based on certification alone.
