= Hamilton Palace (disambiguation) =

Hamilton Palace is the now-demolished former residence of the Dukes of Hamilton in Scotland.

Hamilton Palace may also refer to:

- Hamilton Palace (Hoogstraten), a country house and mausoleum in East Sussex, England
- Hamilton Palace, a nightclub in Hamilton, Scotland, named for the palace
