= Fruit Bat =

Fruit Bat(s) or Fruitbat(s) may refer to:

- Fruit bat or Megabat, a suborder of bats that eat fruit
- Fruit Bats (band), an American band
- Fruitbat (born 1958; Les Carter), English musician and guitarist of Carter the Unstoppable Sex Machine
- "Fruitbat" (Bluey), an episode of the first season of the animated TV series Bluey
