= 1995 Brixton riot =

Riot in London, England

The Brixton riots of 1995 began on 13 December after the death of a black 26-year-old, Wayne Douglas, in police custody. Douglas had allegedly robbed a couple in bed at knifepoint hours earlier. Trouble broke out after what had been a peaceful protest outside the Brixton Police Station where the death occurred. With several hundred people involved, the riot resulted in damage to property and vehicles in the area. Police sealed off a three-kilometre (2 mile) area around Brixton in south London.

== Death of Wayne Douglas ==
Wayne Douglas was in police custody. The police statement said that Douglas died after collapsing while being questioned. Although the post-mortem on Douglas revealed that he had died of heart failure, the inquest into his death showed that he had been held face-down with his hands cuffed behind his back on four occasions.

== The riots ==
The picketing of Brixton Police Station was over the death of Douglas. Some eyewitness accounts describe the police presence at the demonstration as "incredibly heavy-handed".

According to the police "Officers were wearing protective clothing because we had reports of missiles being thrown." The Dogstar, Coldharbour Lane was among the businesses attacked by the rioters. The riot later developed into what police called "sporadic pockets of trouble in the area around Brixton town centre". The police stated that "We gave them every opportunity to move off peacefully but they hadn't done so."

One police officer suffered a broken shoulder, fractured ribs and bruising during the riots. He praised the Territorial Support Group for protecting him from rioters after he was knocked off his motorbike and beaten.

== Causes ==
The New York Times quotes Harold Douglas, as saying:

Last night happened because the only time a black man is seen and listened to is when he comes out on the street...They cause a million pounds of damage and then people start taking notice.

Paul Condon was quoted by The New York Times:

It was not Brixton rioting last night. It was a small minority of thugs and criminals who, as ever, were looking for the opportunity to embark on criminal activities.

A local resident at the time stated:

Local people are not only pissed off with the death of Wayne Douglas but the whole gentrification of Brixton. Council houses and houses occupied by squatters are being sold off and local pubs like the Atlantic, traditionally run by black people, was opened last week by yuppies as 'The Dog Star'. In anger this was smashed, looted and burnt out. The £33 million City Challenge development including CCTV is only of benefit to big business not local stallholders.

SchNews quoted a resident, identified as 'Joyce', as saying:

People were putting up barricades. There were hundreds of people involved, mostly young black and white people and they were local, they weren't outsiders. This was a combination of black people dying in police custody and the way Brixton is at the moment. The place is being yuppified with City Challenge while unemployed centres, adventure playgrounds and libraries are getting shut.

== Cultural references ==
- Carter USM's song "And God Created Brixton" from the 1997 album A World Without Dave was written about the 1995 Brixton riots.

== See also ==
- Brixton
- Brixton riot (1981)
- Brixton riot (1985)
- 2011 London riots
- Urban riots
