= 1992 (disambiguation) =

1992 was a leap year starting on Wednesday of the Gregorian calendar.

1992 may also refer to:

- 1992 (number)
- 1992 (album), a 2016 album by the Game
- 1992 (EP), a 2016 mixtape by Princess Nokia
- 1992 (TV series), a 2015 Italian political drama series
- 1992 – The Love Album, a 1992 album by Carter the Unstoppable Sex Machine
- 1992 (film), a 2024 American thriller
