= Happy Daze (compilation album) =

1990 compilation album

Compilation album by Various artists
- Released: 1990
- Label: Island
- Compiler: Gary Crowley

Happy Daze is a compilation album of songs linked to the Madchester music genre distributed by Island Records in 1990.

== Influence ==
The Madchester sound had been developing during the later 1980s, from its nascent jangly sounds originally showcased on the NME's classic C86 cassette. By 1990, Madchester and related music was becoming more mainstream, but Happy Daze's release helped to crystallise awareness of the new overall Madchester sound by featuring tracks from several different yet converging forces. Although all have the 'Madchester spirit', by no means all the bands were from Manchester: Primal Scream, The Shamen, and The Soup Dragons being Scottish, The Farm from Liverpool, The Charlatans from Northwich and the Pixies American. Likewise, not every group on the compilation performed the dance rock style typical of Madchester bands: e.g. Ride were a shoegazing band.

This has been seen as a criticism of the album, along with the glaring omission of songs by New Order or The Stone Roses and for not anticipating the imminent arrival of Grunge music.

== Track listing ==
1. "Loaded" - Primal Scream
2. "Real, Real, Real" - Jesus Jones
3. "Come Home" - James
4. "Hippychick" (Original SG Mix) - Soho
5. "Big" - New FADs
6. "Velouria" - Pixies
7. "Taste" - Ride
8. "She Comes in the Fall" - Inspiral Carpets
9. "Groovy Train" - The Farm
10. "The Only One I Know" - The Charlatans
11. "Circle Square" - The Wonder Stuff
12. "Sheriff Fatman" - Carter USM
13. "ProGen" - The Shamen
14. "Wrote For Luck" - Happy Mondays
15. "I'm Free" - Soup Dragons
