= Brixton protests =

Brixton protests may refer to:

- 1981 Brixton riot – 11 April 1981
- 1985 Brixton riot – 28 September 1985
- 1995 Brixton riot – 13 December 1995
- 2011 Brixton riot – 7 August 2011; see 2011 London riots
