= The Only Living Boy in New Cross =

1992 single by Carter the Unstoppable Sex Machine

Single by Carter the Unstoppable Sex Machine

from the album 1992 – The Love Album
- B-side: "Watching the Big Apple Turn Over"; "Panic"
- Released: 13 April 1992
- Length: 3:56
- Label: Chrysalis
- Songwriters: Leslie George Carter; James Neil Morrison
- Producers: Carter the Unstoppable Sex Machine; Simon Painter

Carter the Unstoppable Sex Machine singles chronology
"R.u.b.b.i.s.h" (1992)	"The Only Living Boy in New Cross" (1992)	"Do Re Me So Far So Good" (1992)

"The Only Living Boy in New Cross" is a song by English indie punk band Carter the Unstoppable Sex Machine from their third studio album, 1992 – The Love Album. The title is a pun on Simon and Garfunkel's song "The Only Living Boy in New York", substituting the London area of New Cross. The song was released on 13 April 1992 by Chrysalis Records and reached number seven on the UK Singles Chart, making it the band's highest charting and only top-10 single. It also charted in Australia and Ireland, peaking at number 70 on the Australian Singles Chart and number 18 on the Irish Singles Chart. In the United States, the song peaked at number 26 on the Billboard Modern Rock Tracks chart.

== Track listing ==
No.	Title	Length
1.	"The Only Living Boy in New Cross"	3:56
2.	"Watching the Big Apple Turn Over"	3:30
3.	"Panic"	2:54

== Charts ==
Chart (1992)	Peak position
Australia (ARIA)	70
Europe (Eurochart Hot 100)	37
Ireland (IRMA)	18
UK Singles (Official Charts)	7
UK Airplay (Music Week)	38
US Modern Rock Tracks (Billboard)	26

== Release history ==
Region	Date	Format(s)	Label(s)	Ref.
United Kingdom	13 April 1992	7-inch vinyl; 12-inch vinyl; CD; cassette	Chrysalis	
Australia	11 May 1992	CD; cassette	Chrysalis	
