= Farmer Phil's Festival =

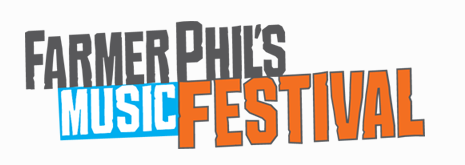
- Genre: Rock, ska, reggae, cover bands
- Dates: August
- Locations: Near Gatten Farm, Ratlinghope, Shropshire, England
- Years active: 1998–present
- Website: http://www.farmerphilsfestival.com

Farmer Phil's Festival is a music festival that takes place in early August at Gatten Farm, near Ratlinghope, Shropshire. The festival was founded by, and is managed by the eponymous Philip Harding and was first held in 1998.

== History ==
Main Stage in 2017 - Ferocious Dog on stage

Early festivals were simply a marquee in a corner of one of the farm's fields. The festival has since grown to its current capacity of around 2,000, and expanded from a two to three-day festival in 2009. The festival properly takes place from Friday to Sunday, although the festival is unusual in that it allows festival-goers to camp for the entire week before, from Monday onwards, with occasional musical acts events during that time.

== Musical styles ==
Russhuntel Stage in 2017 - Les Carter on stage

The festival previously featured a number of musical styles. Notable acts up to 2017 included rock (The Quireboys, Dr. Feelgood, The Blockheads), folk punk (Ferocious Dog), ska (The Selecter), folk rock (Wille and the Bandits, Gaz Brookfield, Mad Dog Mcrea, Rusty Shackle), blues (The Reverend Peyton's Big Damn Band), dance (Dreadzone, The Orb), world music (3 Daft Monkeys) and singer-songwriters (Les Carter, John Otway).

Since 2018, the festival has mainly concentrated on a few retro headliners (Doctor and the Medics and Aswad in 2018, Lindisfarne and The Neville Staple Band in 2019), with a large number of local and cover bands.

== Stages ==
Originally a single stage event, a second stage (The Russhuntel Stage, mainly catering for acoustic and solo acts) was added in 2007. A comedy/cabaret marquee was also added shortly afterwards.

== Awards ==
Farmer Phil's Festival targets itself as a family-friendly one, and has won Festival Kidz "Best Tiny Festival" award twice, in 2015 and 2017.
