= The Good, the Bad, the Average and Unique =

Compilation album by Carter the Unstoppable Sex Machine
- Released: December 2005

Carter the Unstoppable Sex Machine chronology
Brixton Mortars (2004)	The Good, the Bad, the Average and Unique (2005)	You Fat Bastard (2007)

The Good, the Bad, the Average and Unique is an album of demos, B-sides and alternate takes by British electronic rock artists Carter the Unstoppable Sex Machine. The title comes from a lyric in the group's successful 1992 single; "The Only Living Boy in New Cross". The artwork echoes the sleeve of the group's previous b-sides collection; Starry Eyed And Bollock Naked (1994).

== Track listing ==
1. "Everything You Ever Wanted To Know About Everything"
2. "Hounded (with Wez)"
3. "Sweetheart Sugar Baby (Full band version)"
4. "Elvis Lives (& carterbreakamerica)"
5. "Junk Male (demo)"
6. "Drop The Bomb (demo)"
7. "Every Time A Churchbell Rings (demo)"
8. "A Sheltered Life (demo)"
9. "Granny Farming In The UK (demo)"
10. "Ceasefire" (acoustic version recorded in Spain)
11. "Airplane Food" (acoustic version recorded in Spain)
12. "Elvis Lives (Oxford Zodiac soundcheck)"
13. "Johnny Cash (Oxford Zodiac soundcheck)"
