= Phoenix FM =

Coordinates: 51°38′4″N 0°17′56″E

- Brentwood and Billericay; England
- Frequencies: FM: 98.0 MHz; DAB: 8A (North East London/South West Essex), 8B (Harlow), 9A (Southend)

Programming
- Format: Community radio

Ownership
- Owner: Phoenix FM Limited

History
- First air date: 29 December 1996 (restricted licence); 23 March 2007 (fully licensed)

Links
- Webcast: MP3 Stream
- Website: phoenixfm.com

Phoenix FM is a community radio station serving the areas of Brentwood and Billericay, United Kingdom, broadcasting on 98.0FM, east London, south and west Essex, north Kent and east Hertfordshire on DAB, and worldwide online. Their FM/DAB broadcasts cover an area of over 3,200,000 people.

== History ==
The station was formed in 1996 and has been broadcasting full-time on FM since 23 March 2007, having completed twelve 28-day restricted service licence broadcasts on FM between 1996 and 2006.

Phoenix FM was also the first community radio station in the UK to provide a streaming internet service, in 2001.

On 16 February 2006, Ofcom announced that Phoenix FM, after ten years of campaigning, had been awarded a full-time Community Radio licence.

Having previously set up studios in Ongar Road, The Hermitage and Hutton Poplars Lodge, Phoenix FM moved its base of operations to the Baytree Centre in early 2007 and started broadcasting full-time on 98.0 FM at 7pm. on Friday 23 March 2007. The station relocated to the Brentwood Centre in February 2012.

Phoenix FM left the Brentwood Centre in July 2026 and moved into new studios in Thorndon Country Park, Brentwood.

The station's Creative Sessions have given studio recording time to unknown and young local bands as well as featuring established recording artists such as Republica, Imogen Heap, Turin Brakes, Salad, Echobelly, Midway Still, Chris T-T, Inme and MJ Hibbett.

== DAB ==
East London and Essex Digital, a consortium led by Phoenix FM and including Basildon station Gateway 97.8, was awarded the DAB multiplex licence for North East London/South West Essex by Ofcom in July 2024.

Phoenix FM started broadcasting from DAB multiplexes in Southend on 30 April 2025, North East London/South West Essex on 5 January 2026 and Harlow on 17 February 2026. The combined terrestrial coverage of the station now exceeds 3,200,000 listeners.

== Notable current and former presenters ==
- Snooker player Ronnie O'Sullivan, who presented the Midweek Matchzone show with Chris Hood between 2015 and 2018.
- Snooker player Steve Davis, who presented the Interesting Alternative show from 1996 to 2021, (jointly with Kavus Torabi from 2011-2021)
- 'Allo 'Allo! actor Vicki Michelle
- Eric Pickles, former Brentwood and Ongar MP
- Brandon Lewis, Conservative politician
- Sonny Jay Muharrem from The Loveable Rogues who presented on Phoenix FM for two years before moving to Capital FM
- Carter USM guitarist/songwriter Les "Fruitbat" Carter
- Comedian and singer Jordan Gray
- The Damned guitarist/songwriter Roman Jugg
- Boxer Rebellion drummer Piers Hewitt
- My Life Story singer Jake Shillingford
- Singer/songwriter Chris T-T
- Kula Shaker drummer Paul Winter-Hart
- The Others singer Dominic Masters
- Former music and football agent Eric Hall
- Former Essex cricketer Ian Pont
