= Panic (The Smiths song) =

1986 single by the Smiths

Single by the Smiths
- B-side: "Vicar in a Tutu"; "The Draize Train"
- Released: 21 July 1986
- Recorded: May 1986
- Studio: Livingston (London)
- Genre: Alternative rock
- Length: 2:20
- Label: Rough Trade
- Composer: Johnny Marr
- Lyricist: Morrissey
- Producer: John Porter

The Smiths singles chronology
"Bigmouth Strikes Again" (1986)	"Panic" (1986)	"Ask" (1986)

Official video
- "Panic" on YouTube

"Panic" is a song by the English rock band the Smiths, released in 1986 and written by lead vocalist Morrissey and guitarist Johnny Marr. The band's first recording as a five-piece featuring new member Craig Gannon, "Panic" bemoans the state of contemporary pop music, exhorting listeners to "burn down the disco" and "hang the DJ" in retaliation. The song was released by Rough Trade as a single and reached No. 7 on the Irish Singles Chart and No. 11 in the UK Chart. Morrissey considered the song's appearance on daytime British radio a "tiny revolution" in its own way, as it aired amongst the very music it criticised.

Morrissey later gave a controversial interview for Melody Maker about the song's subject matter, which spurred allegations of latent racism in the lyrics and allusions to the Disco Sucks campaign of the 1970s, which some commentators at the time accused of being motivated by racism. This was strongly denied by the Smiths, who also claimed that the interview had grossly misquoted Morrissey. The affair led to debate about the song's meaning, including more recent speculation that it is in fact about Jimmy Savile and his then-veiled sexual abuse.

It was later included in the compilation albums The World Won't Listen and Louder Than Bombs (both 1987).

== Background and recording ==
"Panic" was recorded at London's Livingston Studios in May 1986. It was the group's first recording sessions since they completed work on their third album The Queen Is Dead six months earlier. During the interim period, bassist Andy Rourke had been fired due to his heroin addiction, which had interfered with his playing. The band hired Craig Gannon to replace him, but after they rehired Rourke, guitarist Johnny Marr offered Gannon a position as second guitarist.

The then five-piece band worked with producer John Porter; this was his first work with the group in two years. He was concerned that the song was too short, so he copied the band's first take from 5 May and spliced a repetition of the first verse at the end to increase its length. The group was unimpressed and opted to leave the song as they originally structured it.

== Composition and lyrics ==
A story circulated as the basis for the song holds that Marr and Morrissey were listening to BBC Radio 1 when a news report announced the Chernobyl nuclear disaster. Straight afterwards, BBC disc jockey Steve Wright played the song "I'm Your Man" by pop duo Wham! "I remember actually saying, 'What the fuck has this got to do with people's lives?'" Marr recalled. "We hear about Chernobyl, then, seconds later, we're expected to jump around to 'I'm Your Man'". While Marr subsequently stated that the account was exaggerated, he commented that it was a likely influence on Morrissey's lyrics. The band later commissioned a T-shirt featuring Wright's portrait and the phrase "Hang the DJ!"

"The anecdote might well be true," writes Tony Fletcher in A Light That Never Goes Out, his biography of the Smiths, but he states that "I'm Your Man" had been off the UK pop charts for several months by the time of the Chernobyl disaster and that "Morrissey hardly needed further provocation to attack Wright, whose highly ranked afternoon show treated all popular music as secondary to his madcap party format". (The antagonism was apparently mutual; former Smiths manager Scott Piering says that at a 1985 meeting, Wright and his producer both made clear that they disliked the band's music.) Moreover, the song itself makes no mention of the radio.

The song begins with Morrissey mentioning chaos unravelling throughout Britain and Ireland (specifically mentioning London, Birmingham, Leeds, Grasmere, Carlisle, Dublin, Dundee, and Humberside). In the second part of the song, he reveals that the source of this chaos is pop music, which "says nothing to [him] about [his] life". In reaction, he implores listeners to "burn down the disco" and "hang the DJ", the latter lyrics repeated with the addition of a chorus of schoolchildren. Journalist Nick Kent described "Panic" as a mandate for "rock terrorism". John Luerssen calls it a "commentary on the tepid state of pop music in 1986" and a "chiming guitar song," based around a rotation between the G major and E minor chords. Simon Goddard has said it mimics "Metal Guru" by the glam rock band T. Rex. Luerssen calls the song Marr's homage to the T. Rex song.

== Release and reception ==
The song "extended The Smiths' unorthodox tradition of releasing a non-album A-side" as a single. It reached number 11 on the UK Singles Chart and stayed on the chart for eight weeks. The single also stayed on the Irish Singles Chart for five weeks, reaching a peak of number 7, and reached number 32 on the Dutch Top 40. "Panic" was voted Single of the Year by the annual NME readers poll, and also ("somewhat incongruously", noted Goddard) ranked sixth in the Best Dance Record category.

=== Racism allegations ===
"Panic" drew negative reaction from some critics who construed Morrissey's lyrics to have a racist connotation. Paolo Hewitt in the NME wrote, "If Morrissey wants to have a go at Radio 1 and Steve Wright, then fine [but] when he starts using words like disco and DJ, with all the attendant imagery that brings up for what is a predominantly white audience, he is being imprecise and offensive". Fletcher says that the lack of any explicit indication the song was about radio meant "Panic" "could be construed as reviving the racist and homophobic 'Disco Sucks' campaign of late 1970s America". Scritti Politti's Green Gartside accused the song and the band of racism.

Morrissey denied the accusation, and in a September 1986 Melody Maker interview with Frank Owen decried Owen's suggestion that he was leading a "black pop conspiracy". Additional criticism was sparked by the same interview, wherein Morrissey was quoted naming reggae as "the most racist music in the entire world". Marr, in particular, was incensed by the article and in a 1987 NME interview threatened to "kick the living shit" out of the writer if he met him, such was his anger at the article's slant. He also countered that "disco music" could not be simply equated with "black music", saying, "To those who took offence at the 'burn down the disco' line [...] I'd say please show me the black members of New Order!"

Fletcher suggests the song was not as much about race or sexuality as it was about the culture of British popular music. "For British Smiths fans," he writes,

... the 'disco' of 'Panic' was generally presumed to mean the longstanding city-centre meet market, which suggested exclusivity by demanding patrons wear a tie, or at least to 'dress smart,' but where drinks were overpriced, fights routine, and both the disc jockeys and the commercial Top 40 music that they played was almost embarrassingly disconnected from the neighbouring streets. Then again, when the Smiths performed 'Panic' to nearly 15,000 white American college kids, outdoors in the suburbs of Massachusetts, such reference points, vaguely stated in the first place, were easy to misconstrue.

== Music videos ==
Two music videos were released for "Panic", both of which were directed by Derek Jarman. The first, which the band does not appear in, saw the song used in medley with "The Queen is Dead" and "There Is a Light That Never Goes Out" in promotion of the band's then-recent studio album of the former's same name (although "Panic" does not appear on the aforementioned album), which Jarman created as a short film for the 1986 Edinburgh Festival. The second, better-known video for "Panic", in promotion of its release as a single, sees footage of the band performing the song at a gig overlayed with footage from its segment in Jarman's film.

== Track listing ==
All lyrics are written by Morrissey; all music is composed by Johnny Marr.

7-inch vinyl record (RT193)
No.	Title	Length
1.	"Panic"	2:20
2.	"Vicar in a Tutu"	2:21
Total length:		4:41

12-inch vinyl record and CD (RTT193/RTT193CD)
No.	Title	Length
1.	"Panic"	2:20
2.	"Vicar in a Tutu"	2:21
3.	"The Draize Train" (instrumental)	5:10
Total length:		9:51

== Artwork and matrix message ==
An image of a young Richard Bradford, known for his lead role as private eye McGill in the 1960s British TV adventure series Man in a Suitcase, features on the sleeve cover.

Etching in the runout on the British 7" single reads "I DREAMT ABOUT STEW LAST NIGHT", a pun on a lyric from "Reel Around the Fountain" ("I dreamt about you last night"), while the 12" version did not have a matrix message. The German 12" runout reads "HANG THEM HIGH MONIKA/HANG THEM HIGH MONIKA".

== Personnel ==
The Smiths

- Morrissey – vocals
- Johnny Marr – guitar
- Mike Joyce – drums; percussion
- Andy Rourke – bass guitar
- Craig Gannon – rhythm guitar

== Charts ==
Chart (1986)	Peak position
Irish Singles	7
Netherlands (Dutch Top 40)	19
Netherlands (Single Top 100)	32
UK Singles (Official Charts)	11
UK Indie	1

== Certifications ==
Region	Certification	Certified units/sales
United Kingdom (BPI)	Silver	200,000^{‡}
^{‡} Sales+streaming figures based on certification alone.

== Cover versions ==
"Panic" was covered by Carter the Unstoppable Sex Machine and included as a B-side to their single, "The Only Living Boy in New Cross". It was later included on their 1993 compilation album, This is the Sound of an Electric Guitar.

"Panic" was covered by Pete Yorn and included on the album Live at The Roxy.

"Panic" was covered by Ryan Adams as part of his Covers series, and was released as a single on streaming platforms.

“Panic” was also covered by The Nolan Sisters.

== Appearances in media ==
"Panic" appears in the 2004 film Shaun of the Dead and in "Hang the DJ", a 2017 episode of the television series Black Mirror. The latter episode takes its title from the chorus of the song. The song also appeared in the 1986 Italian horror sequel Demons 2.

The title of an episode of The Simpsons, "Panic on the Streets of Springfield" – which features parodies of Morrissey and the Smiths – is based on the lyrics of "Panic".

In 2007, NME placed "Panic" at number 21 in its list of the 50 Greatest Indie Anthems Ever.

In 2017, Rob Sheffield of Rolling Stone placed the song number six in his ranking of 73 songs by the Smiths.

At the Glastonbury Festival 2017, a Smiths tribute band led the audience in a protest against Theresa May by changing the lyrics "hang the DJ" to "hang Theresa".
