= Abdoujaparov =

English punk rock band

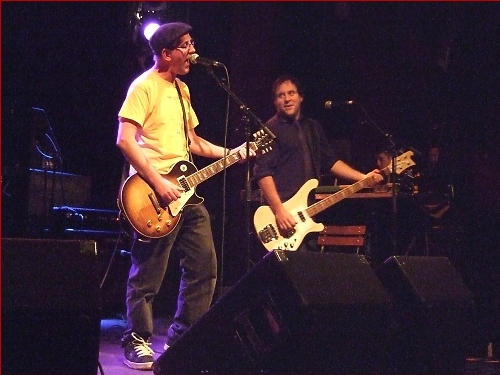
- Abdoujaparov in concert (31 October 2008, Hamburg)

Background information
- Origin: London, England
- Genres: Post-punk; Alternative rock
- Years active: 1998–present
- Labels: Spinach; Pop Gun
- Members: Les Carter; Richy Crockford; Bomber; Jon Barnard
- Website: abdou.co.uk

Abdoujaparov are a punk band formed on 19 October 1998 by ex-Carter USM guitarist Les Carter.

The band have released eight EPs, two singles and four albums. A compilation CD featuring tracks from the first three EPs was released by Pop Gun in Australia. The band has toured the UK, Germany, Australia and America.

Carter and guitarist Richy Crockford have also recorded and toured under the name iDou, which consists of the two playing guitars over a backing track supplied by an iPod Shuffle.

The band composed the song Pop Pop Pop for the 2004 video game Airburst Extreme, and Carter and Crockford wrote the music featured in the Xbox live arcade game TotemBall.

The band is named after Uzbekistani professional cyclist Djamolidine Abdoujaparov.

== Discography ==
Albums

- Air Odeon Disco Pub (2002)
- Cycle Riot History Gang (2007)
- Seaside Arcade Bingo Patrol (2014)
- Race Home Grow Love (2021)

EPs

- Punk Confetti (1998)
- Maria's Umbrella (1999)
- Baby Food (1999)
- Just Shut Up! (2000)
- Emergency Medical Hologram (2001)
- Well Oiled (2003)
- Ultra Cool (2005)
- Uncle Fruity (2013)

Singles

- Murder (on Dalberg Rd)
- Emergency Medical Hologram (2001)

Misc

- Djamolidine (1999)
- Live at the Astoria (2002)
- Free Bonus CD (2002)
- Cycle Riot History Gang Bonus Disk (2007)
- Rock Space Bingo Beaver (2014)

iDou

- Perfect Hands (2006)
