= Sheriff Fatman =

Single by Carter the Unstoppable Sex Machine

from the album 101 Damnations
- Released: 4 December 1989
- Recorded: 1989
- Genre: Alternative dance; punk
- Length: 4:46
- Label: Big Cat Records
- Songwriters: Leslie George Carter; James Neil Morrison
- Producer: Simon Painter

Carter the Unstoppable Sex Machine singles chronology
"A Sheltered Life"	"Sheriff Fatman"	"Rubbish"

"Sheriff Fatman" is a song by English indie rock band Carter the Unstoppable Sex Machine, released in 1989, and featured on their debut album, 101 Damnations (1990). The track is probably their best-known original composition. The lyrics rail against slum landlords and their intimidatory tactics used against tenants, and include references to Nicholas van Hoogstraten (referred to as "Nicholas van what's his face") and Peter Rachman, as well as Nazi war criminal Klaus Barbie. "Sheriff Fatman" featured on the influential 1990 Madchester compilation album Happy Daze.

== Track listings ==
- 12" vinyl ABB100T
- CD USMCD1
1. "Sheriff Fatman"
2. "R.S.P.C.E."
3. "Twin Tub With Guitar"
4. "Everybody's Happy Nowadays" (Pete Shelley)

== Charts ==
Chart (1991)	Peak position
UK Singles (OCC)	23
UK Airplay (Music Week)	59
US Alternative Airplay (Billboard)	29
