= A World Without Dave =

EP by Carter the Unstoppable Sex Machine
- Released: 1997
- Genre: Alternative dance, alternative rock
- Label: Cooking Vinyl

Carter the Unstoppable Sex Machine chronology
Straw Donkey... The Singles (1995)	A World Without Dave (1997)	I Blame the Government (1998)

Professional ratings
Review scores
Source	Rating
AllMusic	2/5 stars

A World Without Dave is an EP by Carter the Unstoppable Sex Machine. It was the group's only EP release of original material and was their first release after signing for Cooking Vinyl in 1997.

A World Without Dave was released as an EP to reduce the retail price compared to a full-length album, with the intention of generating higher sales. The album was also the first recorded with bass player Salv and guitarist Steve, each of whom would remain part of Carter until the group's demise. The album reached number 73 in the UK Albums Chart.

== Track listing ==
1. "Broken Down in Broken Town"
2. "A World Without Dave"
3. "Before the War"
4. "Nowhere Fast"
5. "Johnny Cash"
6. "And God Created Brixton"
7. "Stand Up and Be Counted" (U.S & German release and 2018 vinyl release only)
8. "Negative Equity" (U.S & German release and 2018 vinyl release only)
9. "Road Rage" (U.S & German release and 2018 vinyl release only)
10. “Elvis Lives and Carterbreakamerica” (2018 vinyl release only)
- The U.S. version and the German version contain 9 tracks rather than just the first six due to Cooking Vinyl's American arm asking for more tracks.
- The EP was included in the 2018 vinyl box set “The Studio Recordings 1988-1998”, and featured the U.S. and Germany track listing plus one additional track, making it the length of a full studio album.

== Personnel ==
- Recorded at The House in the Woods, Notice Studios and Chateau Fruitbat
- Engineering by Simon Milton and Simon Painter
- A sleeve called Dave by Jim Bob
- Carter are: Jim Bob, Fruitbat, Wez, Salv, Steve and Ben
- All songs written by Morrison/Carter and published by Island Music Ltd.
