= Murder mile =

Idiom or nickname

Murder Mile is a nickname sometimes given to roads known for high crime rates or military conflict.

Now a popular shopping destination, Ledra Street in Nicosia was called "Murder Mile" in the late 1950s when Cyprus was still under British rule, as the EOKA guerilla organisation targeted civilians and servicemen in their fight for union with Greece. In London, in the borough of Hackney, a mile-long road stretching from Upper Clapton to Lower Clapton was referred to as Britain's Murder Mile due to the high number of murders committed in the area. Main Road in Mualla, a district of Aden, became known as the Murder Mile during the British occupation in the 1960s.
