= Ferocious Dog =

English musical group

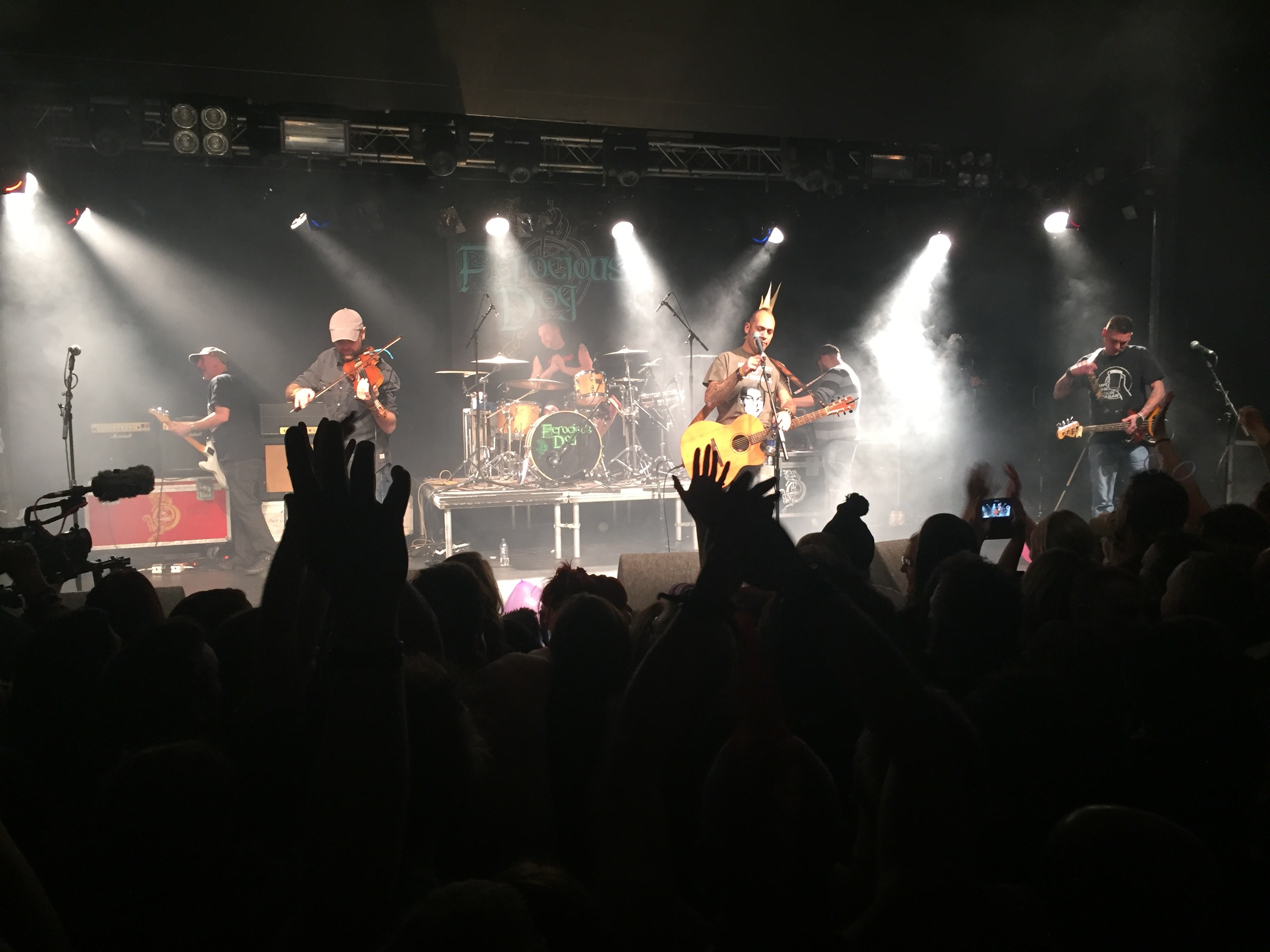
- Ferocious Dog on stage at Rock City, Nottingham in November 2015

Background information
- Origin: Warsop, Nottinghamshire, England, UK
- Genres: Celtic punk, folk punk, Celtic rock, ska punk
- Years active: c. 2011-Present
- Label: Graphite Records
- Members: Ken Bonsall; Kyle Peters; Sam Wood; Nick Wragg; Jamie Burney; Luke Grainger
- Website: ferociousdog.co.uk

Ferocious Dog are an English folk punk band from Warsop, Nottinghamshire, England. The band has headlined tours of the UK and Europe, performed in Dubai, festivals such as Bearded Theory, Alchemy, Deerstock, Farmer Phil's Festival, Splendour and Beautiful Days, and toured in support of New Model Army, The Levellers and The Wonder Stuff. In 2015 the band played in the Field of Avalon at Glastonbury Festival.

== History ==
The band released a number of EPs before a first album on Weird Sounds in 2013, described by Louder Than War as "startlingly good, and so it should be, it’s been many years in the making". The album has been reviewed positively in both folk and metal sources.

On 11 February 2015, Ferocious Dog announced that they would be releasing a second album, From Without, this was funded by fans pre-ordering the album in advance. It was produced by Matt Terry and mastered by Al Scott. It was released in October 2015 after single releases of "Ruby Bridges" in June 2015 and "Slow Motion Suicide" in August 2015.

Touring the new material started at The Bodega in Nottingham on 7 March 2015, the first live appearance with the new line-up including Leslie Carter on guitar and Scott Walters on drums - it sold out in 22 minutes. This kicked off a busy year of touring and festivals, culminating in a sell-out home town gig at Rock City in Nottingham. Ferocious Dog are the first independent act to sell-out the venue in its 35-year history. The band encouraged those attending to bring items for a local food bank to the gig, completely swamping the room Rock City had put aside to store them in the process. The gig was filmed and recorded, and released as a CD and DVD. 2016 ended with a UK and European tour supporting The Levellers, including shows in the Netherland and Germany. Further shows in the Netherlands were played in February 2017.

The band announced a final tour in 2026.

== Fans ==
Fans of Ferocious Dog are affectionately referred to as 'Hell Hounds' - taking their name from the Ferocious Dog song.

== Lee Bonsall ==
Pivotal to the ethos of Ferocious Dog is the fate of Ken's son Lee. Lee served in Afghanistan from the age of 18, and upon rejoining civilian life took his own life in 2012 at the age of just 24, unable to overcome the post traumatic stress disorder he was suffering stemming from one of his friends being killed by a sniper. Lee is commemorated in the songs "The Glass, Lee's Tune" and "A Verse for Lee" on their first album. This gave rise to the Lee Bonsall Memorial Fund which is a constant focus for fundraising and awareness building by the band. Lee's story was featured in the BBC documentary Broken by Battle.

== Discography ==
=== Albums ===
Title	Peak chart position		Release details
Title	UK	UK Folk	Release details
Ferocious Dog	—	—	Released: 2013
Ferocious Dog 3 Piece Acoustic	—	—	Released: 2014
From Without	—	—	Released: 2015
From Without Acoustic	—	—	Released: 2017
Red	—	—	Released: 2017
Fake News & Propaganda	—	—	Released: 2019
The Hope	31	1	Released: 2021
Kleptocracy	-	-	Released: 2024

=== EPs and singles ===
- "Ferocious Dog" (2011)
- "Hell Hounds" (2012)
- "Revolution" (2012)
- "Ruby Bridges" (2015)
- "Slow Motion Suicide" (2015)
- "American Dream" (2017)
- "The Landscape Artist" (2018)
- "Psychedelic Spin" with Dr. Peacock (2019)

=== Other media ===
- Live at Rock City (CD/DVD) (2016)
- Live at the Rescue Rooms (CD/DVD) (2018)

== Members ==
=== Current ===
- Ken Bonsall - Vocals, Acoustic Guitar (1988–present)
- Jamie Burney - Violin (2022 –present)
- Kyle Peters - Electric Guitar (2010 - 2014, 2022–present)
- Luke Grainger - Percussion (2022–present)
- Nick Wragg - Bassist (2022–present)
- Sam Wood - Banjo, Mandolin, Bouzouki, Acoustic Guitar, Whistles, Accordion (2021–present)

=== Former ===
- Dan Booth - Violin (Founding member 1988–2022)
- Dave Drury - Bass Guitar (Founding Member 1988 - 2014)
- Paul Newbury - Drums (Founding Member 1988 - 2005) Deceased
- Jimmy Carroll - Guitars, Banjo, Mandolin, Tin Whistle, Uilleann pipes (Founding Member 1988 - 2003)
- Brad Drury - Drums (2005 - 2014)
- Paul Hallam - Mandolin (2010)
- Daniel Hughes - Electric Guitar ()
- Ryan Holleywell - Electric Guitar ()
- 'Mushy' - Drums (2014 - 2015)
- Scott Walters - Drums (2015–2017)
- Ellis Waring - Acoustic Guitar, Mandolin, Bouzouki, Banjo (2010–2017)
- John Leonard - Guitars, Banjo, Mandolin, Tin Whistle, Uilleann pipes (2017–2019)
- Leslie Carter - Electric Guitar (2015–2019)
- Johnny Edwards - Banjo, Acoustic Guitar, Mandolin, Accordion, Whistle, Harmonica, Mandola (2019 - 2021)
- Ryan Brooks - Electric Guitar (2019 - 2022)
- John Alexander - Bass Guitar (2014–2022)
- Alex Smith - Drums (2017–2022)
