= Starry Eyed and Bollock Naked =

Compilation album by Carter the Unstoppable Sex Machine
- Released: March 1994
- Genre: Alternative dance, alternative rock
- Label: Chrysalis Records

Carter the Unstoppable Sex Machine chronology
Post Historic Monsters (1993)	Starry Eyed and Bollock Naked (1994)	Worry Bomb (1995)

Professional ratings
Review scores
Source	Rating
Allmusic	link

Starry Eyed and Bollock Naked (A Collection of B-Sides) was the first b-side collection by Carter the Unstoppable Sex Machine. It was released in March 1994 and reached 22nd place on the UK charts. The album artwork features an orange Volkswagen Beetle which belonged to Jim Bob at the time of release.

The compilation omits all the b-sides that the band recorded as cover versions.

== Track listing ==
1. "Is This The Only Way To Get Through To You" - 3:41
2. "Granny Farming In The UK" - 4:18
3. "R.S.P.C.E." - 3:07
4. "Twin Tub With Guitar" - 3:04
5. "Alternative Alf Garnett" - 2:56
6. "Re Educating Rita" - 2:11
7. "2001: A Clockwork Orange" - 1:57
8. "The 90's Revival" - 2:04
9. "A Nation Of Shoplifters" - 2:03
10. "Watching The Big Apple Turn Over" - 3:30
11. "Turn On Tune In And Switch Off" - 2:28
12. "When Thesauruses Ruled The Earth" - 3:11
13. "Bring On The Girls" - 2:53
14. "Always The Bridesmaid Never The Bride" - 2:03
15. "Her Song" - 2:27
16. "Commercial Fucking Suicide (Part 1)" - 3:56
17. "Stuff The Jubilee (1977)" - 2:02
18. "Glam Rock Cops" - 3:41
