= Carter the Unstoppable Sex Machine =

English indie punk band

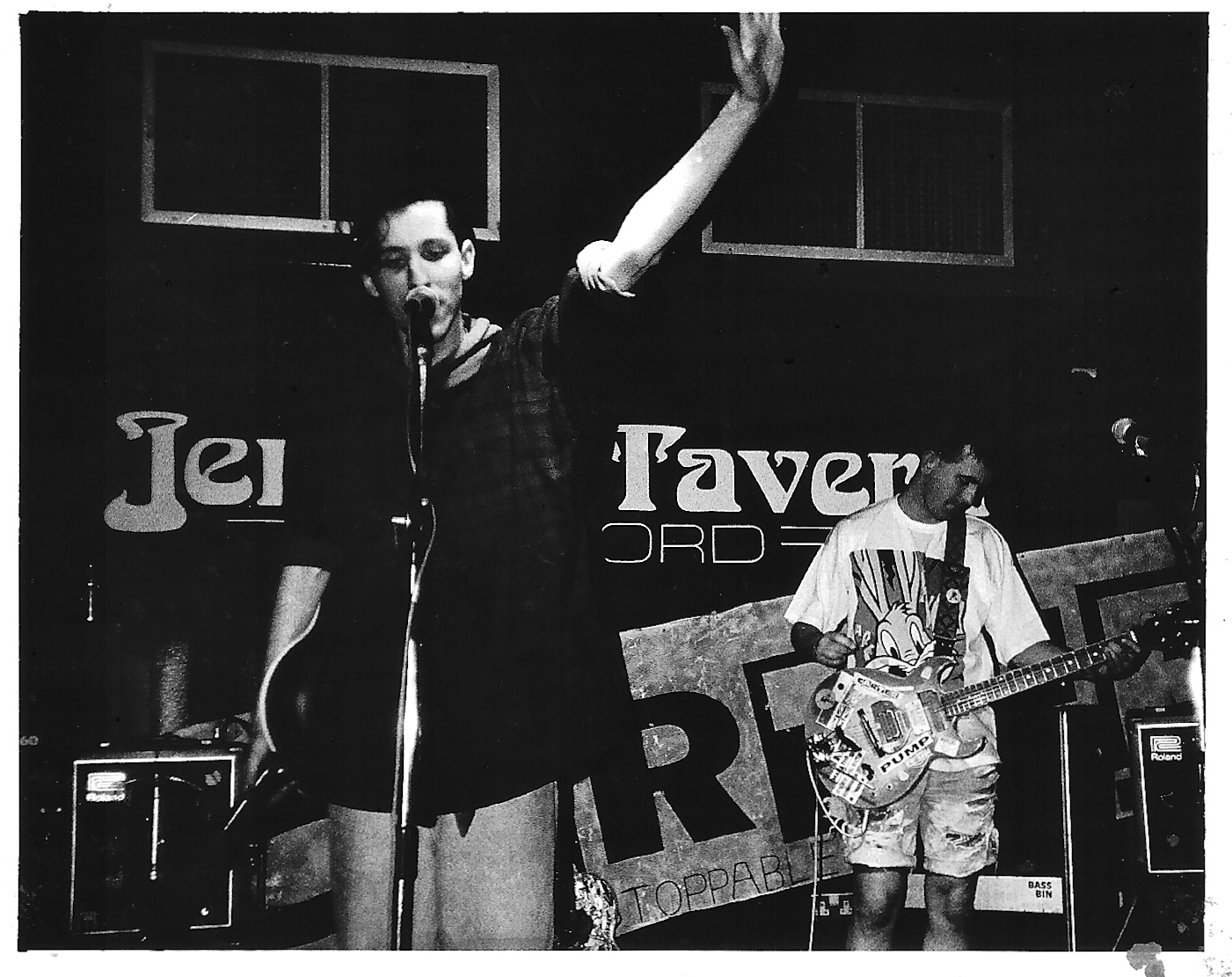
- Carter the Unstoppable Sex Machine (1989)

Background information
- Also known as: Carter USM
- Origin: London, England
- Genres: Alternative rock; indie rock; alternative dance; grebo; punk rock
- Years active: 1987–1998; 2007–2014
- Labels: Rough Trade; Chrysalis; Cooking Vinyl; MLP
- Spinoff of: Jamie Wednesday
- Past members: Jim Bob; Fruitbat; Wez; Steve; Ben Lambert; Salvatore Alessi
- Website: carterusm.co.uk

Carter the Unstoppable Sex Machine (also known as Carter USM or simply Carter) were an English indie rock band formed in 1987 by singer Jim "Jim Bob" Morrison and guitarist Les "Fruitbat" Carter. They made their name with a distinctive style of power pop, fusing samples, sequenced basses and drum machines with rock 'n' roll guitars and off-beat wordplay-loaded lyrics. They reached the height of their fame in 1992–1993. Over the following years the band took on new members, reaching a six-piece. They initially split up in 1998 after releasing seven albums.

In 2007, Carter USM reformed and continued to perform a small number of shows annually, without releasing any new material, until amicably splitting again at the end of 2014.

== History ==
=== Starting out: 1987–1990 ===
Based in Lambeth in South London, England, Carter and Morrison originally played in an indie band called Jamie Wednesday, which released two singles: "Vote For Love" and "We Three Kings of Orient Aren't". Carter the Unstoppable Sex Machine were formed on 6 August 1987 when Carter and Morrison were the only band members to turn up for a charity gig at the London Astoria, and went on stage to perform as a duo with backing tapes. The debut single, "A Sheltered Life", was released later in 1988 on the Big Cat label, but it was not until the second single, "Sheriff Fatman", was released in 1989 that the band began to receive recognition. That song was followed by the album 101 Damnations – a critical account of life south of the River Thames, full of black humour, cynicism, wordplay and puns. The album reached number 29 on the UK Albums Chart.

The band's gigs became well known for a wall of white stage lights that threw off enormous heat and contributed to the sweaty, stage-diving crowd scenes that became part of the band's image. Such scenes are depicted in the video In Bed With Carter, filmed at the Brixton Academy.

=== Rough Trade: 1991 ===
In 1991 – having signed to Rough Trade Records – Carter USM released the album 30 Something which, thanks to non-stop touring, entered the UK Albums Chart at number eight. One of the singles released from the album, "Bloodsport for All", an attack on racism and bullying in the army, was released at the start of the Gulf War and consequently banned by the BBC. Spurred on by infamy, Jim Bob and Fruitbat toured Japan, Yugoslavia and the United States (with EMF) and made a second-on-the-bill appearance at the Reading Festival. The band also made its first Top of the Pops appearance with the single "After the Watershed (Early Learning The Hard Way)", a song about child abuse that would become more famous for its subsequent legal battle with The Rolling Stones' publisher over the use of the lyrics "Goodbye Ruby Tuesday" in the chorus. The band also hit the headlines when Fruitbat rugby tackled the children's TV presenter Phillip Schofield in front of millions of television viewers at the Smash Hits Poll Winners Party in 1991.

=== Chrysalis Records: 1992–1995 ===
The demise of Rough Trade records necessitated a change of label, and Carter made the switch to Chrysalis Records to work on their third album. That album, 1992 – The Love Album, went straight to number one in the UK Albums Chart, propelling the band to pop stardom. Also, in 1992, the band headlined the Glastonbury Festival where Fruitbat, annoyed at the shortening of their headline set due to other bands overrunning insulted Michael Eavis and was subsequently banned from the festival forever. The band was unhappy, however, and this came across in the anger and cynicism of their next record, Post Historic Monsters.

In 1994, Carter's friend Wez, from former support band Resque, joined the band on drums and the newly inspired trio played America, Japan and Europe, including a major concert in Croatia which was recorded and later released on video. The recording was also given away as a free live album with Carter's fifth studio LP, Worry Bomb – a punk-pop album with upbeat material such as "Let's Get Tattoos" and slow acoustic songs such as "My Defeatist Attitude".

=== Cooking Vinyl: 1996–1998 ===
In 1996, Carter left Chrysalis Records and joined Cooking Vinyl. With Salv from the band S*M*A*S*H on bass, Wez's brother Steve on guitar, and teenager Ben Lambert on keyboards, Carter became a six-piece band.

After signing to Cooking Vinyl they released a mini-album, A World Without Dave, and started their longest ever UK tour. The band then went back to Canada and the U.S. They decided to split shortly after their 10th anniversary, and their final studio album, I Blame The Government, was released in January 1998. Two further albums, Live! and BBC Sessions, were released in the same year, in June and October respectively.

=== Post-USM projects: 1999–present ===
Les Carter plays with the band Abdoujaparov and was announced on 27 November 2014 as the new guitarist for Ferocious Dog. He plays bass with Keith TOTP. He is also a former presenter on the Brentwood radio station Phoenix FM, having presented a regular weekly show between 2001 and 2011. James Morrison's projects included the band Jim's Super Stereoworld before moving on to solo albums including Angelstrike! He has also written four books: Goodnight, Jim Bob, detailing his experiences on the road with Carter USM; and three novels – Storage Stories, Driving Jarvis Ham, The Extra Ordinary Life of Frank Derrick, Age 81, and Frank Derrick's Holiday of a Lifetime. He also appeared in Gutted – A Revengers Musical that debuted at the 2010 Edinburgh Fringe Festival.

EMI released Anytime Anyplace Anywhere, a "best of" record featuring tracks from the band's birth until their switch to Cooking Vinyl. This reportedly annoyed the band as they were not consulted or even made aware of the release of the record. In 2004 two new Carter CDs were released: a live album of BBC concerts from the early 1990s, and Brixton Mortars, a compilation album of tracks from their final two studio albums. In 2006, Carter released a new compilation of unreleased tracks and rarities called The Good, The Bad, The Average And Unique. Echoing the earlier Starry Eyed And Bollock Naked, the sleeve features a Volkswagen Beetle – this time a bright green new model convertible. Autumn 2007 saw the release of a band-authorised best of compilation album spanning their entire career on EMI, under the title, You Fat Bastard. The title came from a chant performed by the crowd at gigs. It originated from MC (and lighting man) Jon "Fat" Beast's topless on-stage band introductions. Jon "Fat" Beast died on 27 July 2014.

== Members ==
- James Morrison (Jim Bob) - vocals, guitar (1987–1998, 2007–2014)
- Lesley Carter (Fruitbat) - guitar, vocals, keyboards, programming (1987–1998, 2007–2014)
- Wez - drums (1994–1998)
- Steve - guitar (1996–1998)
- Ben Lambert - keyboards, programming (1996–1998)
- Salvatore Alessi (Salv) - bass (1996–1998)

== Discography ==
=== Studio albums ===
Year	Title	Chart positions			Certifications (sales thresholds)
Year	Title	UK	AUS	SWE	Certifications (sales thresholds)
1990	101 Damnations: Released: 1990; Labels: Chrysalis	29	185	–	
1991	30 Something: Released: February 1991; Labels: Chrysalis	8	138	–	UK: Gold
1992	1992 – The Love Album: Released: May 1992; Labels: Chrysalis	1	89	35	UK: Gold
1993	Post Historic Monsters: Released: September 1993; Labels: Chrysalis	5	128	–	
1995	Worry Bomb: Released: February 1995; Labels: Chrysalis	9	174	–	
1998	I Blame the Government: Released: January 1998; Labels: Cooking Vinyl	92	–	–	

=== Compilation albums ===
Year	Title	UK	AUS
1990	Handbuilt by Perverts: Released: 1990 ABB103X; Label: Big Cat Records	–	177
1993	This Is the Sound of an Eclectic Guitar: Released: July 1993; Label: Chrysalis Records	–	–
1994	Starry Eyed and Bollock Naked: Released: March 1994; Label: Chrysalis Records	22	197
1995	Straw Donkey... The Singles: Released: October 1995; Label: Chrysalis Records	37	–
2005	The Good, the Bad, the Average and Unique: Released: December 2005; Label: Who's The Daddy Now?	–	–
2007	You Fat Bastard: Released: October 2007; Label: EMI	–	–

=== Live albums ===
Year	Title
1998	Sessions: Released: October 1998; Label: Cooking Vinyl
1999	Live!: Released: February 1999; Label: Cooking Vinyl
2009	The Drum Machine Years: Released: 13 November 2009; Label: Concert Live
2014	The Final Comedown: Released: December 2014; Label: Nyquest

=== EPs ===
Year	Title	UK
1997	A World Without Dave: Released: March 1997; Labels: Cooking Vinyl	73

=== Singles ===
Release date		|Title	Chart Positions				Album
Release date		|Title	UK	AUS	IRL	US Alt	Album
1988	Oct	"A Sheltered Life"	153	–	–	–	chart position of 1994 reissue
1989	Nov	"Sheriff Fatman"	–	–	–	–	101 Damnations
1990	Jun	"R.u.b.b.i.s.h"	111	–	–	–	—
1990	Oct	"Anytime Anyplace Anywhere"	83	–	–	–	30 Something
1991	Jan	"Bloodsport for All"	48	165	–	–	30 Something
1991	Jun	"Sheriff Fatman" (Reissue)	23	164	–	29	101 Damnations
1991	Oct	"After the Watershed (Early Learning the Hard Way)"	11	124	21	–	—
1992	Jan	"R.u.b.b.i.s.h" (Reissue)	14	–	13	–	—
1992	Apr	"The Only Living Boy in New Cross"	7	70	18	26	1992 – The Love Album
1992	Jun	"Do Re Me So Far So Good"	22	136	–	–	1992 – The Love Album
1992	Nov	"The Impossible Dream"	21	185	–	–	1992 – The Love Album
1993	Aug	"Lean on Me I Won't Fall Over"	16	187	–	–	Post Historic Monsters
1993	Oct	"Lenny and Terence"	40	–	–	–	Post Historic Monsters
1994	Feb	"Glam Rock Cops"	24	–	–	–	Starry Eyed and Bollock Naked
1994	Nov	"Let's Get Tattoos"	30	201	–	–	Worry Bomb
1995	Jan	"The Young Offender's Mum"	34	–	–	–	Worry Bomb
1995	Sep	"Born on the 5th of November"	35	–	–	–	Straw Donkey
