= Fruitbat =

Les Carter

Background information
- Also known as: Fruitbat
- Born: Leslie George Carter; 12 December 1958 (age 67); London, England
- Genres: Rock
- Occupations: Musician, songwriter
- Instruments: Guitar, vocals
- Years active: 1970s–present
- Member of: Abdoujaparov; Smokin' Donuts
- Formerly of: Carter the Unstoppable Sex Machine; Ferocious Dog

Leslie George Carter (born 12 December 1958), also known as Fruitbat, is an English musician who was a member of Carter the Unstoppable Sex Machine.

== Career ==
Carter played in a number of bands during the late 1970s, before meeting Jim Bob (James Robert Morrison) at The Orchestra Pit in Streatham, where their bands The Ballpoints and Dead Clergy used to rehearse. When The Ballpoints' bassist quit at the end of 1980, Les joined the band, who went on to change their name to Peter Pan's Playground. When Peter Pan's Playground split, Carter and Morrison continued to write together and formed the band Jamie Wednesday.

Jamie Wednesday broke up in 1987 after limited success. Jim Bob and Fruitbat stuck together and formed Carter USM, a band in which the two both played guitars and sang while a sequencer and drum machine played backing music. Carter USM had 14 Top 40 singles, one number one album and played over 800 gigs all over the world. A cycling enthusiast, he wore a cycling hat on stage in the early years which became a strong visual trademark for the band. He would often take his bike with him on Carter tours, much to the annoyance of Jim Bob, as detailed in the book, Goodnight Jim Bob.

One of Carter USM's most talked-about moments was when Fruitbat rugby tackled presenter Phillip Schofield on live TV, in front of millions of viewers at the Smash Hits music awards. Schofield made some remarks about the band's performance and Fruitbat has said he was "severely hammered" after drinking a crate of beer supplied by The Farm. The incident made the front pages of many national UK tabloids, and generated infamy for the band.

Carter USM split in 1997, but continued to play semi-regular gigs until bringing the band to a close in 2014. Carter still runs the Carter USM website and fan club and sells band merchandise. He currently lives in Folkestone, and has one current band: his own, Abdoujaparov, and left Nottinghamshire folk/punk band Ferocious Dog in 2019, for which he played guitar. He plays bass in Keith Top Of The Pops & His Minor UK Indie Celebrity All-Star Backing Band. He also performs as Leslie George Carter, singing and playing acoustic guitar. In 2018 he formed Smokin' Donuts a short-term project with long-time friend Doozer. This ceased in early 2020 pre lockdown. Leslie George Carter currently plays in Abdoujaparov, in a duo with Richy Abdou and can occasionally be found performing cameos with Nick Parker and the False Alarms.

Carter presented a weekly music show on Brentwood radio station, Phoenix FM between 2001 and 2011, and again in 2021.
