= Jim Bob =

British musician and author

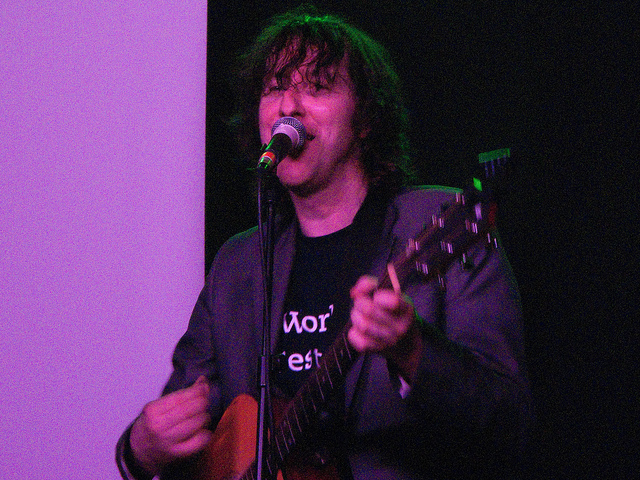
- Jim Bob performing at The Garage, 2010

Background information
- Born: James Robert Morrison
- Origin: London, England
- Genres: Punk rock; acoustic
- Years active: 1978–present
- Labels: The Ten Forty Sound; Cherry Red; EMI; Big Cat; Rough Trade; Fierce Panda
- Formerly of: Jamie Wednesday; Carter the Unstoppable Sex Machine; Jim's Super Stereoworld
- Website: jim-bob.co.uk

James Robert Morrison, known as Jim Bob, is a British musician and author. He was the lead singer of the 1990s indie punk band Carter the Unstoppable Sex Machine. Writing both as J.B. Morrison and under the name Jim Bob, he has written six novels, two volumes of memoir and published a lyric collection.

== Biography ==
The album Pop Up Jim Bob was released on Cherry Red Records in August 2020, peaking on the official UK album chart at number 26. Jim Bob's 13th solo album, Who Do We Hate Today, was released on Cherry Red Records on 20 August 2021 and reached 34 in the UK album charts, his second top-40 solo LP. His 14th solo album, Thanks For Reaching Out was released on Cherry Red Records in June 2023 and peaked at number 9 on the UK Independent Albums Chart.

Morrison released his autobiography, Goodnight Jim Bob: On the Road with Carter the Unstoppable Sex Machine, in 2004. His debut novel, Storage Stories, which took six years to write, was released on the day of a UK general election, 6 May 2010, by Ten Forty Books.

== Solo discography ==
All releases credited as Jim Bob unless otherwise stated. See Carter USM and Jamie Wednesday for those bands' discographies.

Albums
Title	Year	Peak UK albums	Peak UK Ind
Goodnight Jim Bob	2003		
Angelstrike	2004		
School	2006		
A Humpty Dumpty Thing	2007		
Goffam	2009		
What I Think About When I Think About You	2013		
Jim Bob Sings Again	2016		
National Treasure (Live At The Shepherd's Bush Empire)	2018		
Pop Up Jim Bob	2020	26	5
Who Do We Hate Today	2021	34	4
The Essential	2022		14
Thanks for Reaching Out	2023	94	9
Stick	2025		3
Automatic	2025		5

== Bibliography ==
- Goodnight Jim Bob: On the Road with Carter the Unstoppable Sex Machine. Cherry Red. 2004. ISBN 9781901447231.
- Storage Stories. Ten Forty. 2010. ISBN 9780956404909.
- Driving Jarvis Ham. The Friday Project. 2012. ISBN 9780007468324.
- The Extra Ordinary Life of Frank Derrick, Age 81. Pan. 2014. ISBN 9781447252757.
- Frank Derrick's Holiday of A Lifetime. Pan. 2015. ISBN 9781447292029.
- Jim Bob From Carter: In The Shadow Of My Former Self. Cherry Red. 2015. ISBN 9781909454729.
- A God Awful Small Affair. Cherry Red. 2020. ISBN 9781909454798.
- Harvey King Unboxes His Family. Cherry Red. 2020. ISBN 9781914565298.
- Jim Bob: Where Songs Come From. Cherry Red. 2024. ISBN 9781914565335.
