= The Morning Lasted All Day: A Retrospective =

Compilation album by The Dream Academy
- Released: 2014
- Recorded: 1984–2014
- Genre: Rock
- Length: 1:40:39
- Label: Real Gone Music

The Dream Academy chronology
Somewhere in the Sun... Best of the Dream Academy (2000)	The Morning Lasted All Day: A Retrospective (2014)

Professional ratings
Review scores
Source	Rating
AllMusic	link

The Morning Lasted All Day: A Retrospective is a compilation album released by The Dream Academy in 2014. It is the band's second compilation album, following the Japan-only release of Somewhere in the Sun... Best of the Dream Academy in 2000. While the latter album was assembled without input from the band, The Morning Lasted All Day was compiled, annotated, and remastered by lead singer Nick Laird-Clowes. Of the album's 24 tracks, 6 were previously unreleased. These include the instrumental version of "Power to Believe" selected by John Hughes for use in Planes, Trains and Automobiles and "Sunrising", the first song recorded by the band since 1990. Also included are two songs ("Living in a War" and "The Chosen Few") featuring guitar by David Gilmour, who co-produced two of the band's three studio albums.

== Track listing ==
=== Disc One ===
Track	Song title	Time	Original Issue	Year
1.	Life in a Northern Town	4:19	The Dream Academy	1985
2.	The Love Parade	3:49	The Dream Academy	1985
3.	The Edge of Forever	4:24	The Dream Academy	1985
4.	Please, Please, Please, Let Me Get What I Want	3:08	Single	1985
5.	Johnny (New Light)	4:22	The Dream Academy	1985
6.	In Places on the Run	4:29	The Dream Academy	1985
7.	Ballad in 4/4	4:01	Remembrance Days	1987
8.	Girl in a Million (For Edie Sedgwick)	3:49	B-Side to The Love Parade	1985
9.	Power to Believe	5:17	Remembrance Days	1987
10.	This World	5:11	The Dream Academy	1985
11.	Here	4:24	Remembrance Days	1987
12.	One Dream	2:32	The Dream Academy	1985

=== Disc Two ===
Track	Song title	Time	Original Issue	Year
1.	Indian Summer	4:57	Remembrance Days	1987
2.	Lucy September	3:10	A Different Kind of Weather	1990
3.	Hampstead Girl	3:42	Remembrance Days	1987
4.	The Demonstration	4:09	Previously Unreleased Alternate Mix	1989
5.	Living in a War	4:18	Previously Unreleased	1989
6.	Love	3:43	A Different Kind of Weather	1990
7.	Waterloo	5:04	A Different Kind of Weather	1990
8.	The Chosen Few	4:05	Previously Unreleased	1989
9.	It'll Never Happen Again	3:34	A Different Kind of Weather	1990
10.	Power to Believe (Instrumental)	4:43	Previously Unreleased (Heard in Planes, Trains and Automobiles)	1987
11.	The Last Day of the War	4:52	Previously Unreleased	1984
12.	Sunrising	4:50	Previously Unreleased	2014
