= Somewhere in the Sun... Best of the Dream Academy =

Compilation album by The Dream Academy
- Released: 2000
- Recorded: 1984–1990
- Genre: Rock
- Length: 76:45
- Label: Warner Bros.

The Dream Academy chronology
A Different Kind of Weather (1991)	Somewhere in the Sun... Best of the Dream Academy (2000)	The Morning Lasted All Day: A Retrospective (2014)

Professional ratings
Review scores
Source	Rating
AllMusic	link

Somewhere in the Sun... Best of the Dream Academy is a compilation album released by The Dream Academy in Japan in 2000. The compilation album contains the extended version of "Life in a Northern Town" and an acoustic version of "The Party" rather than the more common versions. At the time of its release, Nick Laird-Clowes revealed that the band actually had no involvement with the album, and he went on further to say that they weren't even informed by Warners that a compilation album was being made. His former label boss, Alan McGee, then of Creation Records, was the one who actually brought him home a copy when he was visiting Japan on business. According to Kate St John, around the same time that this album was being made, Warner Brothers were considering a US compilation album, but they and the band decided to re-issue their first album, The Dream Academy.

== Track listing ==
1. "Life in a Northern Town" (Extended Version) – 5:20
2. "Ballad in 4/4" – 3:59
3. "Power to Believe" – 5:15
4. "Lucy September" – 3:08
5. "Twelve-Eight Angel" – 4:20
6. "One Dream" – 2:33
7. "Hampstead Girl" – 3:41
8. "This World" – 5:07
9. "The Love Parade" – 3:46
10. "It'll Never Happen Again" – 3:32
11. "Love" (Hare Krishna Mix) – 7:02
12. "Indian Summer" – 4:55
13. "In Places on the Run" – 4:28
14. "(Johnny) New Light" – 4:23
15. "The Party" (Acoustic Version) – 3:32
16. "Please Please Please Let Me Get What I Want" – 3:07
17. "Waterloo" – 5:03
18. "Lowlands" – 3:46
