= Guy Pratt =

English bassist (born 1962)

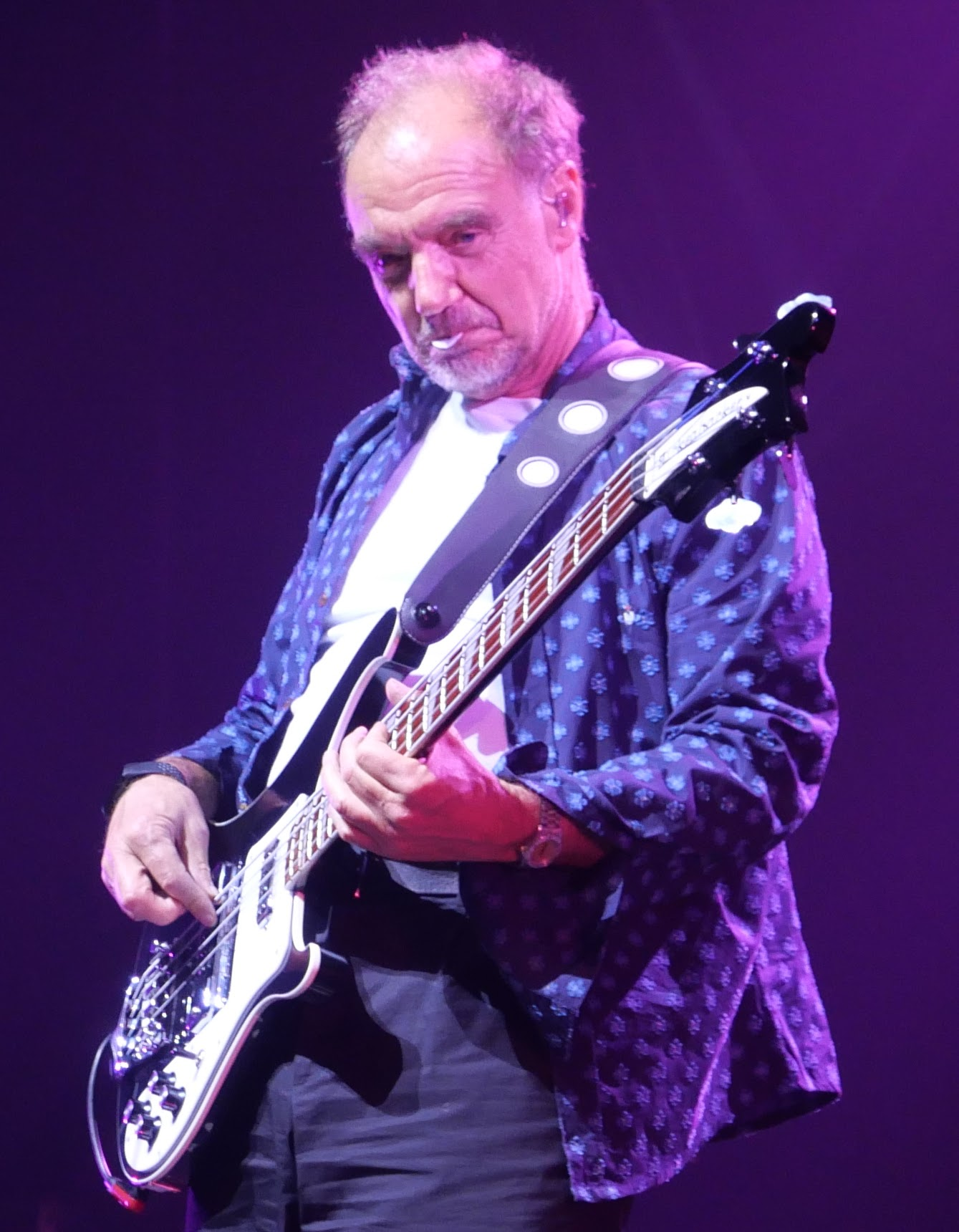
- Pratt performing in 2022

Background information
- Born: 3 January 1962 (age 64); Lambeth, London, England
- Origin: Peckham, London, England
- Genres: Rock; pop; experimental; electronic
- Occupations: Musician; composer; songwriter
- Instruments: Bass guitar; vocals
- Years active: 1981–present
- Member of: Nick Mason's Saucerful of Secrets
- Formerly of: Whitesnake; Icehouse
- Website: guypratt.com

Guy Adam Pratt (born 3 January 1962) is an English bassist. He has worked with artists including Pink Floyd, Roxy Music, Gary Moore, Madonna, Peter Cetera, Michael Jackson, the Smiths, Robert Palmer, Echo & the Bunnymen, Tears for Fears, Icehouse, Bananarama, Iggy Pop, Tom Jones, Debbie Harry, Whitesnake, Womack & Womack, Kirsty MacColl, Coverdale–Page, Lemon Jelly, the Orb, All Saints, Stephen Duffy, Robbie Robertson and A. R. Rahman.

Pratt was a member of the Australian rock band Icehouse, a founding member of the American rock band Toy Matinee, and is currently a member of the band Nick Mason's Saucerful of Secrets.

Pratt has also worked on TV and film soundtracks, including Dick Tracy (1990), Last Action Hero (1993), Hackers (1995), Still Crazy (1998) and Johnny English Reborn (2011). In 2005 he debuted a one-man music and comedy show.

Since 2020 Pratt has co-hosted the podcast Rockonteurs alongside Gary Kemp, which features famous musicians discussing their lives and careers and often ranks at #1 on Apple Music podcast charts.

Pratt has been nominated for two Ivor Novello Awards and was awarded an ARIA Award for his work with Icehouse.

== Early life, family and education ==
Pratt was born on 3 January 1962, in a flat above a shop on the Cut, London. His father, Mike Pratt, was an actor (co-starring as Randall in Randall and Hopkirk (Deceased), songwriter and screenwriter who died when Guy was 14 years old.

== Career ==
Pratt initially worked as a graphic designer, but he decided to concentrate on a music career. In 1981, at age 19, Pratt was asked to tour with the Australian band Icehouse. Icehouse supported David Bowie on his Serious Moonlight Tour, which was Bowie's longest, largest and most successful concert tour. Pratt played bass on the Icehouse albums Sidewalk and Measure For Measure.

In 1986, the Smiths bassist Andy Rourke was arrested on drug possession charges shortly before the Smiths were scheduled to leave for a North American tour in support of The Queen Is Dead. Expecting that Rourke would be denied work visas for the US and Canada, the guitarist, Johnny Marr, asked Pratt to step in. Pratt spent nearly two weeks with the band, learning basslines and rehearsing. Shortly before the band was to leave Britain, Rourke received his visas and Pratt was not required.

While Pratt was playing with the Dream Academy in the 1980s, he met the Pink Floyd guitarist David Gilmour, who was producing them. Gilmour invited him to play on Pink Floyd's Momentary Lapse of Reason Tour after the departure of the Pink Floyd bassist Roger Waters. Pratt, a Pink Floyd fan, later said it was "the defining gig of my life". He said he did not see himself as replacing Waters, who he viewed more as Pink Floyd's "grand conceptualist" than their bassist. Pratt also played on Pink Floyd's 1994 Division Bell album and tour, and the 2014 album The Endless River. He also played on Gilmour's solo albums and is a member of Gilmour's touring band. Pratt's father in law was the Pink Floyd keyboardist, Richard Wright.

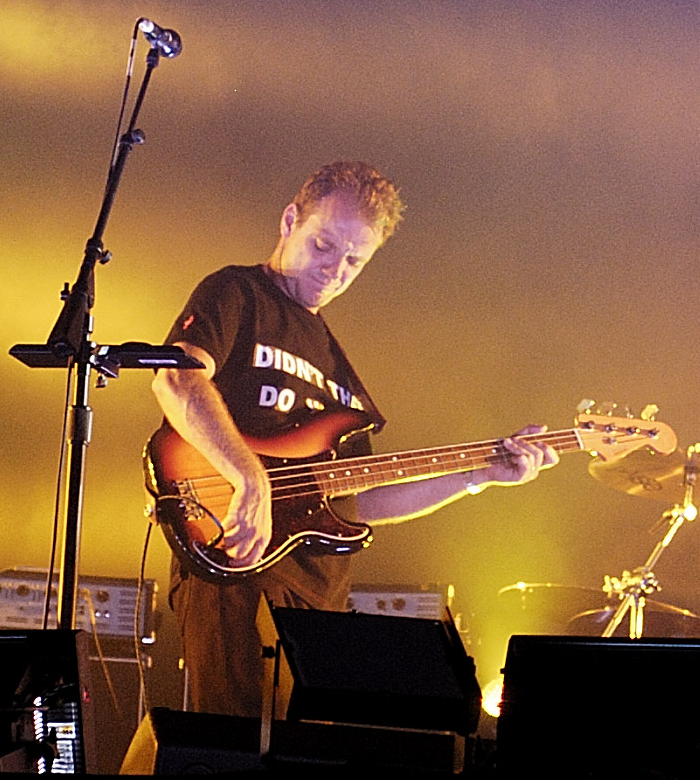
Pratt in 2006

Producer and keyboardist Patrick Leonard approached Pratt in 1988 about forming a band, and helping him recruit members of what would become Toy Matinee. Pratt co-wrote many of the songs and played bass on all of the tracks on Toy Matinee's only studio album, released in 1990. Pratt played bass on Gary Moore's Dark Days in Paradise tour in 1997. Pratt played on the 1989 Madonna single "Like a Prayer" and the 1995 Michael Jackson single "Earth Song".

Pratt is a songwriter and composes music for TV and film. As a songwriter, Pratt co-wrote the UK number-one hit "Ain't No Doubt" by Jimmy Nail. He produced, co-wrote and played bass, guitar and keyboards on the music for the 1998 Channel 4 drama series The Young Person's Guide to Becoming a Rock Star. With regular collaborator Dom Beken, he provided the theme music to Spaced, where he also appeared as the character Minty. Pratt also acted in Linda Green and appeared in an episode of the remake of Randall & Hopkirk, starring Vic Reeves and Bob Mortimer. Pratt's father Mike had played the part of Jeff Randall in the original 1960s series. Pratt also played as a regular in the backing band for the BBC Radio 2 musical comedy show Jammin' with Rowland Rivron.

Pratt and Jimmy Cauty released a single "I Wanna 1-2-1 With You" as Solid Gold Chartbusters in 1999; Pratt and Cauty (a founder of the Orb) later teamed up with the other original member of the Orb, Alex Paterson, to form Transit Kings.

Pratt's one-man music and comedy show, My Bass & Other Animals, debuted in August 2005 at the Edinburgh Festival Fringe. In 2007, he published a memoir with the same name. Pratt spent 2011 performing stand-up in Switzerland, Australia, and at the Edinburgh Fringe, as well as on a South American tour playing bass guitar for Dominic Miller.

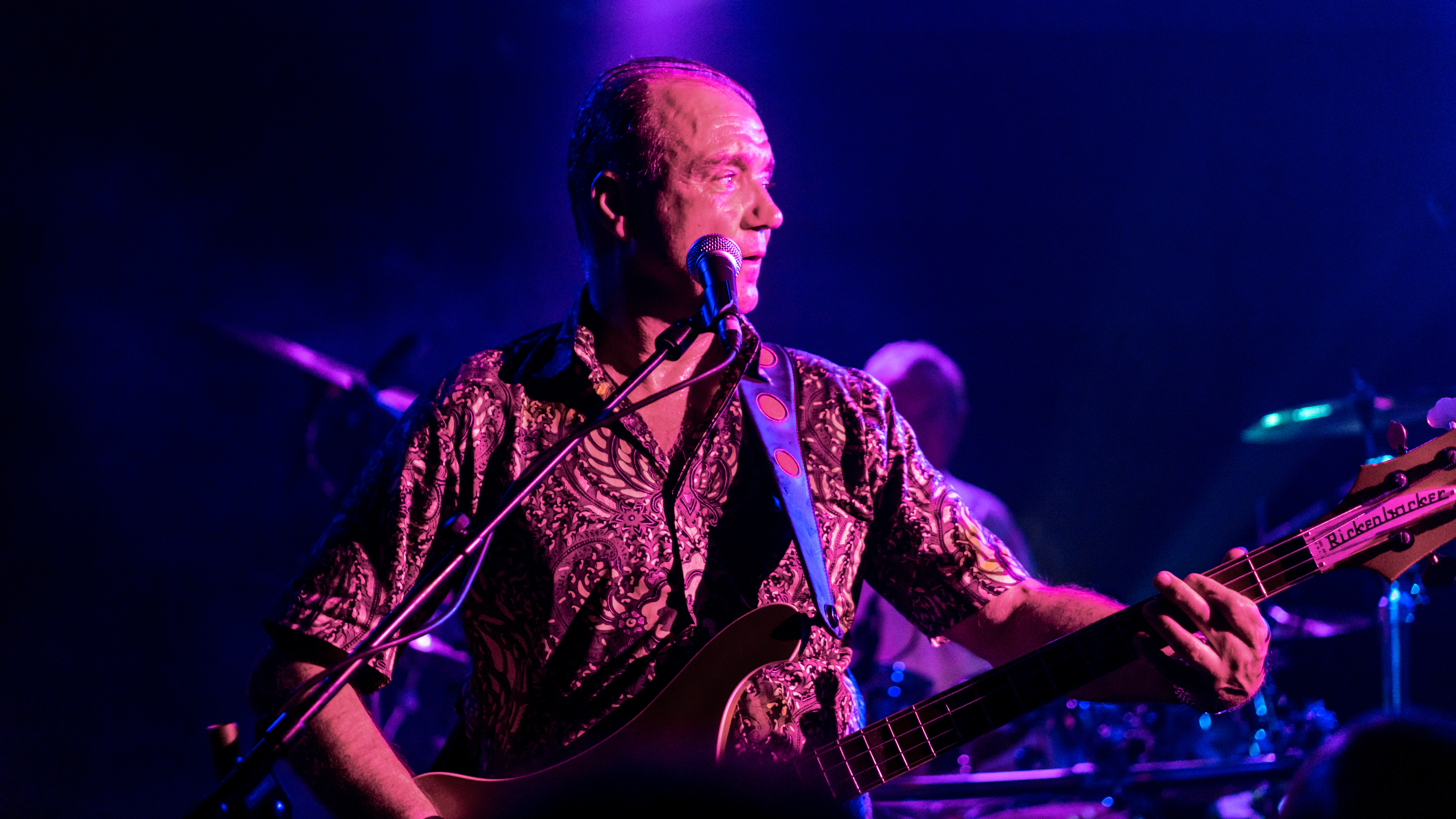
Pratt in 2018

In April 2010, Pratt joined the Argentine cover band the End Pink Floyd, with Durga McBroom and Jon Carin, in Buenos Aires, Argentina. He joined the Australian Pink Floyd Show on stage on 13 June 2011 for the Hampton Court Palace Festival for the song "Run Like Hell". He joined the UK Pink Floyd cover band Brit Floyd on stage on 9 November 2013 as a special guest during the Liverpool leg of their Pulse tour.

In 2018, Pratt and others formed a new band, Nick Mason's Saucerful of Secrets, to perform Pink Floyd's early psychedelic material. Along with Pratt, the band comprises Pink Floyd drummer Nick Mason, former Blockheads guitarist Lee Harris, vocalist and guitarist Gary Kemp of Spandau Ballet, and Pratt's collaborator keyboardist Dom Beken. The band toured Europe and North America in 2018 and 2019, with a third tour postponed to 2021 due to the COVID-19 pandemic. In September 2020, they released a live album and film, Live at the Roundhouse. During the COVID-19 pandemic, Pratt made a series of "Lockdown Licks" videos released on his YouTube channel, reminiscing about some of his best-known work. During and since the COVID-19 pandemic, Pratt has hosted the music-based podcast Rockonteurs with Gary Kemp.

Pratt has been nominated for two Ivor Novello Awards and was awarded an ARIA Award for his work with Icehouse.

== Personal life ==
Pratt married furniture designer Gala Wright, daughter of the Pink Floyd keyboardist Richard Wright, in 1996 in the Royal Borough of Kensington and Chelsea, London. The couple have a son. They later divorced.

In 2013, Pratt moved to Brighton. In 2019, he was announced as the general election candidate for the Renew Party in Brighton Kemptown. That March, he became engaged to the children's author Georgia Byng. Pratt now lives near Alfriston, where he rings church bells at St Andrew's Church.

== Discography ==
=== 1980s ===
| Year | Title | Artist |
|---|---|---|
| 1984 | Sidewalk | Icehouse |
| 1985 | The Ups and Downs | Stephen Duffy |
| 1985 | The Dream Academy | The Dream Academy |
| 1985 | Riptide | Robert Palmer |
| 1985 | "Discipline of Love" (single) | Robert Palmer |
| 1986 | Measure for Measure | Icehouse |
| 1987 | Luz Y Sombra | Flans |
| 1987 | Remembrance Days | The Dream Academy |
| 1987 | Bête Noire | Bryan Ferry |
| 1987 | "Kiss and Tell" (single) | Bryan Ferry |
| 1987 | "The Right Stuff" (single) | Bryan Ferry |
| 1988 | One More Story | Peter Cetera |
| 1988 | Delicate Sound of Thunder | Pink Floyd |
| 1989 | Kite | Kirsty MacColl |
| 1989 | Legend in a Loungeroom | Andy Qunta |
| 1989 | Like a Prayer | Madonna |
| 1989 | "Like a Prayer" (single) | Madonna |
| 1989 | "Dear Jessie" (single) | Madonna |
| 1989 | "Oh Father" (single) | Madonna |

=== 1990s ===
| Year | Title | Artist |
|---|---|---|
| 1990 | Wild and Lonely | The Associates |
| 1990 | Naked | Blue Pearl |
| 1990 | I'm Breathless | Madonna |
| 1990 | Toy Matinee | Toy Matinee |
| 1991 | Ripe | Banderas |
| 1991 | Pop Life | Bananarama |
| 1991 | Long Road | Junior Reid |
| 1991 | Electric Landlady | Kirsty MacColl |
| 1991 | Storyville | Robbie Robertson |
| 1991 | A Different Kind of Weather | The Dream Academy |
| 1991 | The Orb's Adventures Beyond the Ultraworld | The Orb |
| 1992 | Masterfile | Icehouse |
| 1992 | Growing Up in Public | Jimmy Nail |
| 1992 | U.F.Orb | The Orb |
| 1993 | Debravation | Debbie Harry |
| 1993 | Donna De Lory | Donna De Lory |
| 1993 | Call Me Nightlife | Nokko |
| 1993 | Elemental | Tears for Fears |
| 1994 | Billy Pilgrim | Billy Pilgrim |
| 1994 | Mamouna | Bryan Ferry |
| 1994 | Well... | Katey Sagal |
| 1994 | The Division Bell | Pink Floyd |
| 1994 | "Take It Back" (single) | Pink Floyd |
| 1994 | Heitor TP | Heitor Pereira |
| 1994 | The Next Hundred Years | Ted Hawkins |
| 1994 | Meanwhile | Third Matinee |
| 1994 | Fruit of Life | Wild Colonials |
| 1995 | Euroflake in Silverlake | Gregory Gray |
| 1995 | HIStory: Past, Present and Future, Book I | Michael Jackson |
| 1995 | Pulse | Pink Floyd |
| 1995 | A Spanner in the Works | Rod Stewart |
| 1996 | Raise the Pressure | Electronic |
| 1997 | Dark Days in Paradise | Gary Moore |
| 1997 | Blood on the Dance Floor: HIStory in the Mix | Michael Jackson |
| 1997 | The Next Hundred Years [Gold Edition] | Ted Hawkins |
| 1997 | Restless Heart | David Coverdale & Whitesnake |
| 1998 | Dil Se.. for the song Dil Se Re | A. R. Rahman |
| 1998 | Messiah Meets Progenitor | Messiah |
| 1998 | The Ted Hawkins Story: Suffer No More | Ted Hawkins |
| 1999 | What Are You Going to Do with Your Life? | Echo & the Bunnymen |
| 1999 | Michael Hutchence | Michael Hutchence |
| 1999 | Reload | Tom Jones |

=== 2000s ===
| Year | Title | Artist |
|---|---|---|
| 2000 | Lemonjelly.ky | Lemon Jelly |
| 2000 | Ronan | Ronan Keating |
| 2000 | Somewhere in the Sun: Best of the Dream Academy | The Dream Academy |
| 2001 | Born | Bond |
| 2001 | Crystal Days: 1979-1999 | Echo & the Bunnymen |
| 2001 | Jacob Young | Jacob Young |
| 2001 | Bring Down the Moon | Naimee Coleman |
| 2001 | White Lilies Island | Natalie Imbruglia |
| 2001 | Read My Lips | Sophie Ellis-Bextor |
| 2001 | Mixed Up World Pt. 2 | Sophie Ellis-Bextor |
| 2001 | They Called Him Tin Tin | Stephen Duffy |
| 2001 | Mink Car | They Might Be Giants |
| 2001 | Toy Matinee: Special Edition | Toy Matinee |
| 2002 | Watching Angels Mend | Alex Lloyd |
| 2002 | Born [Japan Bonus Tracks] | Bond |
| 2002 | Shine | Bond |
| 2002 | Lost Horizons | Lemon Jelly |
| 2002 | Festival | Paola & Chiara |
| 2003 | Remixed [Japan Bonus Tracks] | Bond |
| 2003 | Journey into Paradise | Dr. Alex Paterson |
| 2003 | The Outer Marker | Just Jack |
| 2003 | Shoot from the Hip | Sophie Ellis-Bextor |
| 2003 | Reload [Bonus Tracks] | Tom Jones |
| 2004 | Mistaken Identity | Delta Goodrem |
| 2004 | Live at Montreux, 1997 | Gary Moore |
| 2005 | Explosive: The Best of bond | Bond |
| 2005 | A Million in Prizes: The Anthology | Iggy Pop |
| 2006 | On an Island | David Gilmour |
| 2006 | "Arnold Layne" (single) | David Gilmour |
| 2006 | So Still | Mozez |
| 2006 | Living in a Giant Candle Winking at God | Transit Kings |
| 2007 | Dylanesque | Bryan Ferry |
| 2008 | Live in Gdańsk | David Gilmour |

=== 2010s ===
| Year | Title | Artist |
|---|---|---|
| 2010 | Olympia | Bryan Ferry |
| 2010 | No Decoder | Yogi Lang Band |
| 2011 | Everything Changes | Julian Lennon |
| 2012 | Concerto for Group and Orchestra | Jon Lord |
| 2014 | The Endless River | Pink Floyd |
| 2014 | Avonmore | Bryan Ferry |
| 2015 | Rattle That Lock | David Gilmour |
| 2017 | Live at Pompeii | David Gilmour |
| 2019 | Tales from Outer Space | RPWL |

=== 2020s ===
| Year | Title | Artist |
|---|---|---|
| 2020 | Live at the Roundhouse | Nick Mason's Saucerful of Secrets |
| 2021 | INSOLO | Gary Kemp |
| 2022 | Hey Hey Rise Up | Pink Floyd featuring Andriy Khlyvnyuk |
| 2024 | Luck and Strange | David Gilmour |
| 2025 | Music is Art Vol 1 | Chimpan A |
| 2025 | Live from the Luck and Strange concerts | David Gilmour |

== Filmography ==
| Year | Title | Director(s) | Studio(s) |
|---|---|---|---|
| 1990 | Dick Tracy | Warren Beatty | Touchstone Pictures; Silver Screen Partners; Mulholland Productions |
| 1993 | Last Action Hero | John McTiernan | Columbia Pictures |
| 1995 | Hackers | Iain Softley | United Artists |
| 1998 | Still Crazy | Brian Gibson | Columbia Pictures |
| 2011 | Johnny English Reborn | Oliver Parker | StudioCanal; Relativity Media; Working Title Films |
