= The Love Parade (song) =

Single by The Dream Academy

from the album The Dream Academy
- Released: 19 August 1985 (UK); 1986 (United States)
- Recorded: 1984
- Genre: Dream pop
- Length: 3:50
- Label: Reprise (US); Blanco Y Negro (UK)
- Songwriters: Gilbert Gabriel; Nick Laird-Clowes
- Producer: Alan Tarney

The Dream Academy singles chronology
"This World" (1985)	"The Love Parade" (1985)	"Please Please Please Let Me Get What I Want" (1985)

Music video
- "The Love Parade" on YouTube

"The Love Parade" is the fourth single released by the Dream Academy. It was a more "edgy" song than their previous singles, made so by the inclusion of implied themes of adultery and erotic temptation in the lyrics, and was arranged to a brisk bossa nova-esque beat which was in stark contrast to the style of the group's first single "Life in a Northern Town".

A music video was created to promote the single, which was directed by Peter Kagan and Paula Greis. The video received power rotation on MTV.

== Background ==
The Love Parade is the only song on The Dream Academy's eponymous album not to be produced by David Gilmour. Instead, the band recruited Alan Tarney to work with them on the track. Tarney was brought in at the suggestion of Rough Trade Records founder Geoff Travis to work on "The Love Parade". "What happened was, we had a pretty good demo for “Love Parade,” and we loved it, and when we made the record with David, somehow we never got 'round to it". Lead vocalist Nick Laird-Clowes noted that Tarney brought some "real special techniques" to the table: he tracked the vocals "12 or 15 times" during certain portions of the song.

When asked in a 2024 interview if there were any songs by The Dream Academy that deserved to receive resurgence in popularity similar to Kate Bush's "Running Up That Hill", Laird-Clowes picked "The Love Parade" as one of his selections.

== Release ==
"The Love Parade" was released as a single by Blanco y Negro Records in the United Kingdom on 19 August 1985 with "A Girl In A Million" included as its A-side and B-side. It received a limited edition 7" that was packaged in a gatefold sleeve and a 12" single that included a free poster.

There were high hopes for the single, especially from Warner, and there was some degree of promotion of the song (such as a live performance on American Bandstand). The single became the band's second song to reach the top 40 in the US, peaking at number 36. It also charted in Belgium, Canada, and the UK.

== Critical reception ==
Reviewing "The Love Parade" for Music Week, Jerry Smith wrote that the single's "dreamy cinematic style is emphasized by the light, airy chorus producing an engaging, summery single." Billboard characterised "The Love Parade" as "further dreamy, introspective, and retrospective '60s revisionism." Cashbox said that The Dream Academy "lives up to its name on this dreamy, jazzy little confection", adding that Laird-Clowes' whispy [sic] voice and the band's smooth approach blend to near perfection" on the song.

== Track listing ==
7" version

1. "The Love Parade" - 3:50
2. "Girl in a Million" (for Edie Sedgwick) - 3:50

== Chart performance ==
Chart (1985–1986)	Peak position
Australia (Kent Music Report)	76
Belgium (Ultratop 50 Flanders)	30
Canadian RPM Top 100 Singles	41
UK Singles (OCC)	68
US Billboard Hot 100	36
US Adult Contemporary	13
