= Love (John Lennon song) =

Song by John Lennon

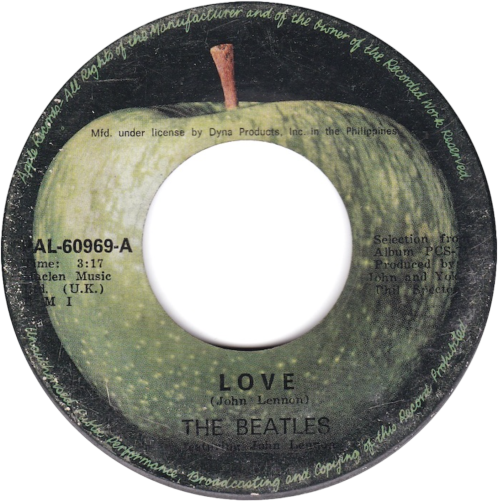
- 1971 Philippines single label

Song by John Lennon

from the album John Lennon/Plastic Ono Band
- Released: 11 December 1970
- Recorded: 26 September – 23 October 1970
- Studio: Abbey Road, London
- Genre: Soft rock
- Length: 3:24
- Label: Apple
- Songwriter: John Lennon
- Producers: John Lennon; Yoko Ono; Phil Spector

"Love"
- UK picture sleeve

Single by John Lennon

from the album The John Lennon Collection
- B-side: "Gimme Some Truth"
- Released: 15 November 1982
- Recorded: 1970
- Genre: Rock
- Length: 3:24
- Label: Apple/Geffen
- Songwriter: John Lennon
- Producers: Phil Spector; John Lennon; Yoko Ono

John Lennon singles chronology
"Watching the Wheels" (1981)	"Love" (1982)	"Nobody Told Me" (1984)
"Jealous Guy" (1988)	"Love" (1998)	"Imagine" (1999)

"Love" is a song written and performed by John Lennon, originally released on his debut solo album John Lennon/Plastic Ono Band (1970). The song's theme is more upbeat than most of the songs on Plastic Ono Band.

== Song ==
The song first came out on Lennon's 1970 album John Lennon/Plastic Ono Band. Lennon considered releasing it as a single, but was dropped in favour of "Mother". However, "Love" received considerable airplay at the time from stations who hesitated at playing "Mother". "Love" later appeared on the compilation The John Lennon Collection (1982), and was released as a promotional tie-in single for the collection. The single version is a remix of the original track, which most notably differs in having the piano intro and outro (played by Phil Spector) mixed at the same volume as the rest of the song; on the original album version, these parts begin much quieter and increase in volume. The B-side was "Gimme Some Truth", but labelled as "Give Me Some Truth".

Ultimate Classic Rock critic Stephen Lewis rated it as Lennon's 5th greatest solo love song, saying that "The close-miced vocals and delicate piano/acoustic guitar instrumentation increase the intimacy of the song." Far Out critic Tim Coffman rated it as Lennon's greatest deep cut, calling it "one of the best examples of Lennon’s melodic sensibilities, moving through different keys effortlessly while still keeping the key melody gliding throughout the track."

An alternate take of the song appears on the John Lennon Anthology box set (1998) as well as the Acoustic album (2004).

The picture on the sleeve for 1982 release of "Love" was taken by famed photographer Annie Leibovitz on 8 December 1980—the day of Lennon's murder.

Like the 1982 British issue, the original version of the song was released as a single again in October 1998 for the Japanese market only with the Japanese edition of another compilation Lennon Legend: The Very Best of John Lennon. This song gained great success on Japan's Oricon chart and won the song of the year 1999 in Japanese gold disc prize.

The song was also used as Lennon's entry on the iTunes exclusive 4-track Beatles EP 4: John Paul George Ringo, released in 2014.

== Personnel ==
The musicians who performed on the original recording were as follows:

- John Lennon – vocals, acoustic guitar
- Phil Spector – piano

== Track listings ==
- All songs written and composed by John Lennon (except where noted).

=== 1982 release ===
1. "Love" [remix]
2. "Gimme Some Truth"

=== 1998 Japan release ===
1. "Love" [album version]
2. "Stand by Me" (Ben E. King/Jerry Leiber/Mike Stoller)

== Charts ==
Year	Country	Position
1982	United Kingdom	41
1998	Japan	58

== Certifications ==
Region	Certification	Certified units/sales
Japan (RIAJ) John Lennon's version, 1999 release	Gold	50,000^{^}
^{^} Shipments figures based on certification alone.

== The Lettermen version ==
The Lettermen recorded the song in 1971. This single became a top 20 hit on the Japanese Oricon singles chart and hit number 42 on the US Billboard Hot 100 chart, becoming the only charting version of the song in the US and the last charting single of the group's career.

=== Charts ===
Year	Country	Position
1971	Japan	15
1971	United States	42 (Hot 100)
1971	United States	8 (AC)

== The Dream Academy version ==
"Love"

Single by The Dream Academy

from the album A Different Kind of Weather
- Released: 1990 (UK); 1991 (USA)
- Recorded: 1990
- Genre: Pop
- Length: 3:42
- Label: Reprise/Blanco Y Negro
- Songwriter: John Lennon
- Producers: Gilbert Gabriel; Nick Laird-Clowes; Steve Lambert

The Dream Academy singles chronology
"In the Heart" (1988)	"Love" (1990)	"Angel of Mercy" (1991)

The Dream Academy covered this song on their album A Different Kind of Weather (1990), and also released as a single (CD, cassette, and vinyl formats are available). The single featured a strong Indian theme throughout (evident in the music video). The song samples the "Funky Drummer" drum break. The CD single included six different mixes of the song along with "Mordechai Vanunu", which was written for Mordechai Vanunu. A second B-side, called "The Demonstration", can be found on the UK CD single version. There are also exclusive remixes issued on the cassette and 12" single. As it turned out, this was the band's penultimate single and has an accompanying video that was shot in India.

=== Reception ===
Like the album it was released on, it received mixed reviews. Many critics and fans felt that they over-stretched it. Reviewed at the time of release, Steve Lamacq of NME said this "version of a John Lennon classic is hallucinogenic enough to survive more than a second spin. "Love" tries to recreate the kind of recording techniques that the Fab Four used to come up with while they were out of their skulls on some strange batch of chemicals."

=== Track listing ===
1. "Love" (single version) – 3:42
2. "Love" (Hare Krishna Mix) – 7:01 (appears on the compilation album Somewhere in the Sun... Best of the Dream Academy)
3. "Love" (Whales in Love) – 4:00
4. "Love" (Dream House) – 7:34
5. "Love" (Love Is 12) – 6:52
6. "Love" (Love Is 7) – 4:18
7. "Love" (Dreamstrumental) – 5:07
8. "Mordechai Vanunu" – 5:39 (written for Mordechai Vanunu)
9. "Love" (Trance mix) (an exclusive remix that only appears on the maxi-cassette single released in the U.S.)

== Jimmy Nail version ==
A version by Jimmy Nail was recorded for his album Big River, which was released as a single on 8 December 1995 (the 15th anniversary of Lennon's death), and peaked at number 33 on the UK Singles Chart.

=== Charts ===
Chart (1995)	Peak position
UK (Official Charts Company)	33

== Other versions ==
Barbra Streisand covered the song in 1971 on her album Barbra Joan Streisand, along with another Lennon composition "Mother". AllMusic critic William Ruhlmann described Streisand's "delicate reading" as a "gem."

Another cover was by Norwegian actress/model/singer Julie Ege.

The song was later covered by Vicky Leandros in several versions, the first on her 1970 UK album I Am, then a guitar version in 1971 in various releases, an a cappella version on her US album Across the Water and a new guitar version with Roland Gabezas in 2005 titled "Ich bin wie ich bin". Shirley Bassey covered the song on her 1972 album I Capricorn.

American musician Beck's version was released in January 2014, and included on the 2014 compilation album Sweetheart 2014.
