= Remembrance Days =

1987 studio album by the Dream Academy

Studio album by The Dream Academy
- Released: 26 October 1987
- Recorded: 1986–February 1987
- Studios: The Lilly Yard, The Farm and The Town House (London, UK); Capitol Studios (Hollywood, California); Amigo Studios, The Slope, Record Plant, Sound Castle Recorders and The Complex (Los Angeles, California); Master Control (Burbank, California)
- Genre: Rock
- Length: 50:21
- Labels: Reprise (US); Blanco Y Negro (UK)
- Producers: Lindsey Buckingham; Nick Laird-Clowes; Richard Dashut; Patrick Leonard; Hugh Padgham

The Dream Academy chronology
The Dream Academy (1985)	Remembrance Days (1987)	A Different Kind of Weather (1991)

Professional ratings
Review scores
Source	Rating
AllMusic	3/5 stars
NME	8/10

Remembrance Days is the second album by the British band the Dream Academy. Not as successful as the band's 1985 self-titled debut, the album peaked at number 181 in the United States.

The lyrics and music for "The Lesson of Love" was written in just two four-hour sessions at Patrick Leonard's home. Nick Laird-Clowes was inspired to write "In Exile" after reading an article in The Village Voice on Rodrigo Rojas.

"Everybody's Got to Learn Sometime" was originally recorded with Hugh Padgham handling production, although record producer Lenny Waronker suggested that the band work with Fleetwood Mac guitarist Lindsey Buckingham to finish the song in Los Angeles. Upon hearing the demo, Buckingham commented that the song was reminiscent of material from The Beatles White Album, an assessment that Laird-Clowes agreed with. Buckingham ultimately rebuilt the song from the ground up and also worked with the band on "Indian Summer", which became the lead single off Remembrance Days.

The instrumental version of "Power To Believe" appeared in the 1987 film Planes, Trains, and Automobiles, however the film's official soundtrack album contained the full vocal version. The instrumental version was finally included on the band's 2014 Greatest Hits compilation The Morning Lasted All Day: A Retrospective.

== Track listing ==
No.	Title	Writer(s)	Producer(s)	Length
1.	"Indian Summer"	Laird-Clowes, Gabriel	Padgham, Laird-Clowes, Buckingham	4:56
2.	"The Lesson of Love"	Laird-Clowes, Leonard	Leonard, Padgham, Laird-Clowes	4:40
3.	"Humdrum"	Laird-Clowes	Padgham, Laird-Clowes	4:18
4.	"Power to Believe"	Laird-Clowes, Gabriel	Padgham, Laird-Clowes	5:15
5.	"Hampstead Girl"	Laird-Clowes, Gabriel	Padgham, Laird-Clowes	3:42
6.	"Here"	Laird-Clowes, Gabriel	Padgham, Laird-Clowes	4:24
7.	"In the Hands of Love"	Laird-Clowes, Gabriel	Padgham, Laird-Clowes	4:49
8.	"Ballad in 4/4"	Laird-Clowes	Padgham, Laird-Clowes	3:59
9.	"Doubleminded"	Laird-Clowes	Padgham, Laird-Clowes	3:53
10.	"Everybody's Got to Learn Sometime"	James Warren	Buckingham, Dashut, Laird-Clowes, Padgham	3:43
11.	"In Exile (For Rodrigo Rojas)"	Laird-Clowes, Gabriel	Padgham, Laird-Clowes	6:42

== Personnel ==
The Dream Academy

- Gilbert Gabriel – keyboards (1, 3–7, 9–11), backing vocals (1, 5, 7, 11), additional keyboards (2)
- Nick Laird-Clowes – vocals, backing vocals (1, 3, 5, 11), guitars (1–3, 5–7, 9–11), acoustic guitar (8), harmonica (8)
- Kate St. John – backing vocals (1–7, 9–11), oboe (1, 5, 6, 10), cor anglais (2, 7, 11), saxophone (3, 11)

Additional musicians

- Patrick Leonard – keyboard programming (2), bass programming (2), drum programming (2)
- Hans Zimmer – Fairlight programming (3, 4)
- Larry Fast – additional keyboards (5), keyboards (9)
- Nicky Holland – additional keyboards (5), synth bass (7), keyboards (8)
- Paul Carrack – acoustic piano (7)
- Lindsey Buckingham – bass (1, 10), backing vocals (1, 10), keyboards (10), guitars (10)
- Robin Smith – additional bass programming (1), bass programming (9)
- Guy Pratt – bass (3, 4, 6–8, 11)
- Jerry Marotta – drums (1, 3, 4, 6, 7, 9–11)
- Paul Brook – drums outro (2), additional drum programming (7)
- David Palmer – drums (8)
- Benedict Hoffnung – percussion (1, 3, 4, 6, 7, 11)
- Muzzy Ismail – percussion (1)
- Adam Peters – electric cello (11)
- Michael Ostin – backing vocals (1)
- JD Souther – backing vocals (1)
- Andrew Williams – backing vocals (1)
- David Williams – backing vocals (1)
- Derek Adams – backing vocals (2, 7)
- June Montana – backing vocals (2)

== Production ==
- Lindsey Buckingham – producer (1, 10)
- Nick Laird-Clowes – producer (1, 3–11), additional production (2)
- Hugh Padgham – producer (1, 3–11), additional production (2)
- Patrick Leonard – producer (2)
- Richard Dashut – producer (10)
- Larry Fast – additional keyboard production
- Peter Saville Associates – art direction, design
- Nick Knight – photography
- Tarquin Gotch – management

Technical credits

- Doug Sax – mastering at The Mastering Lab (Hollywood, California)
- Hugh Padgham – recording, mixing (4, 11)
- James Guthrie – mixing (1, 6, 7)
- Greg Ladanyi – mixing (2)
- Mark Linett – mixing (3, 5, 8, 9)
- Lindsey Buckingham – mixing (10)
- Richard Dashut – mixing (10)
- Paul "Croydon" Cook – assistant engineer

== Chart performance ==
Chart (1987)	Peak position
Canada Top Albums/CDs (RPM)	76
US Billboard 200	181

== Singles ==
- "Indian Summer"
- "The Lesson of Love"
- "Power to Believe"
- "Everybody's Gotta Learn Sometime" (Canada)
