= Let It Down =

- Cover of the original Hansen Publishing sheet music for the song

Song by George Harrison

from the album All Things Must Pass
- Released: 27 November 1970
- Genre: Rock, hard rock
- Length: 4:57
- Label: Apple
- Songwriter: George Harrison
- Producers: George Harrison, Phil Spector

"Let It Down" is a song by English musician George Harrison, released on his 1970 triple album All Things Must Pass. The recording was co-produced by Phil Spector and employs the latter's Wall of Sound production technique to lavish effect. Its brash opening and choruses contrast with the ethereal quality of the verses – a loud/soft approach that has been credited with influencing indie bands during the 1980s and 1990s.

Harrison wrote the song in 1968 and offered it to the Beatles in January 1969 for inclusion on what became their Let It Be album (1970), also produced by Spector. It is one of several Harrison compositions that were turned down by the band and subsequently found acclaim on his first solo release following their break-up. Harrison biographers recognise "Let It Down" as an erotic love song, perhaps written to a woman other than Pattie Boyd, his wife at the time. Separated by 18 months, the song's conception and recording marked two periods of romantic intrigue involving Harrison, Boyd and their friend Eric Clapton. Author Ian Inglis describes "Let It Down" as "a dynamic and passionate depiction of lust and desire".

Harrison recorded the song in London, backed by a large cast of musicians, including the whole of Clapton's newly formed band Derek and the Dominos, Gary Brooker, Gary Wright, Bobby Keys and the group Badfinger. With its dense mix of horns, orchestral strings and heavy rock instrumentation, commentators identify "Let It Down" as an extreme example of Spector's influence on All Things Must Pass, an influence that also provided a disruptive element during the album's creation. An acoustic version of "Let It Down", also taped in 1970 but with overdubs recorded in 2000, appeared as a bonus track on the 30th anniversary edition of All Things Must Pass.

== Background and composition ==
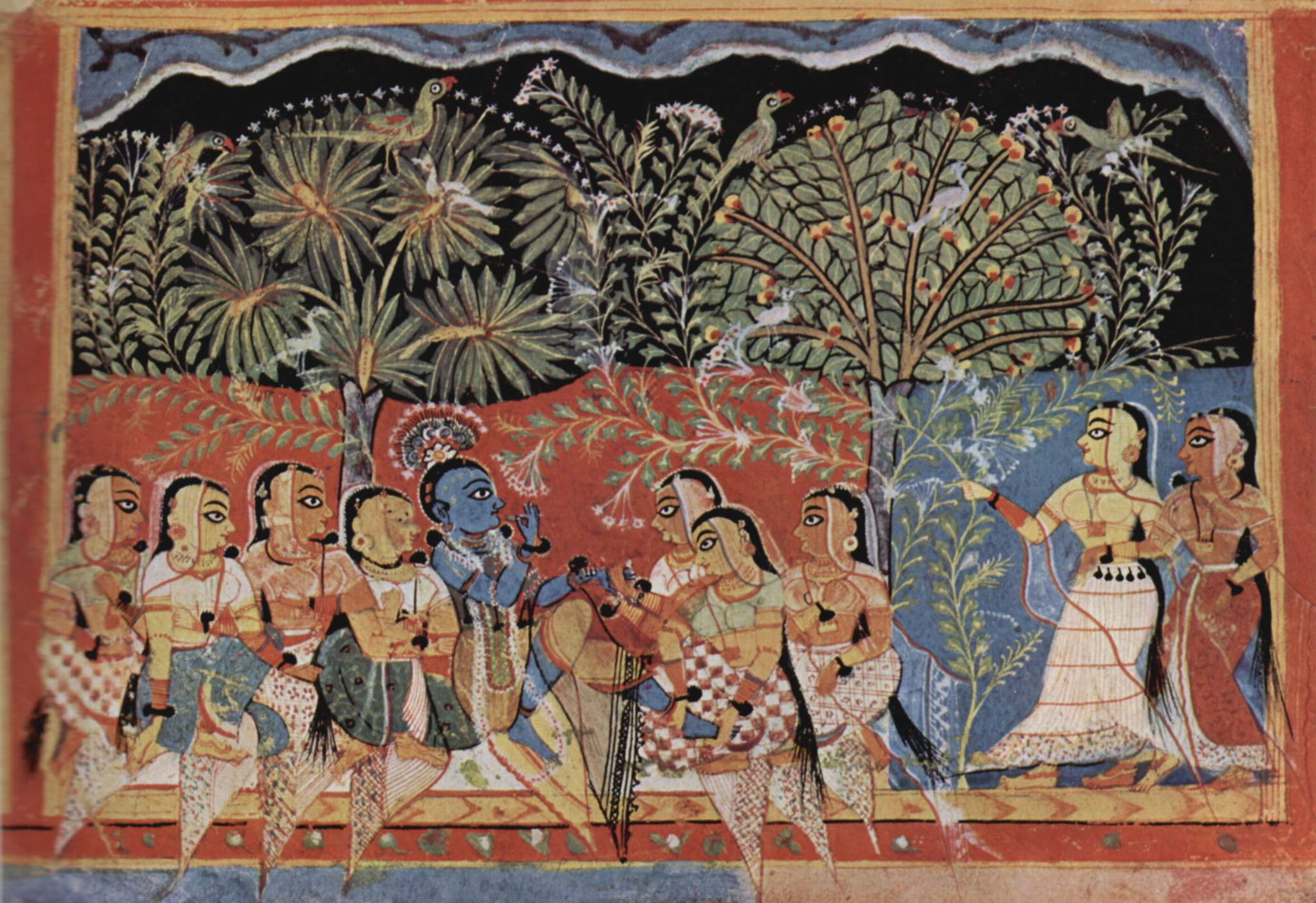
An illustration from the Gita Govinda showing Krishna surrounded by devoted gopis – a traditional depiction that inspired George Harrison around the time he wrote "Let It Down"

Harrison and Pattie Boyd were married in January 1966, having met two years before on the set of the Beatles' film A Hard Day's Night, but by 1968, his dedication to meditation and Eastern mysticism had begun to divide the couple.

Harrison wrote "Let It Down" in late 1968. The song features the same major-seventh chord voicings that intrigued Bob Dylan during that year's Thanksgiving holidays, when the two musicians collaborated on "I'd Have You Anytime" in upstate New York. In the absence of any discussion of the track by Harrison in his 1980 autobiography, commentators have identified "Let It Down" as a sensual love song.

Harrison's musical biographer, Simon Leng, describes the lyrics as being among its composer's "most tactile", full of "sexual passion" and "images of sight and touch". The verses, he suggests, "[revel] in the kind of sensory luxury any Krishna devotee is required to reject". Leng also notes the "clear climactic overtones" evident in the choruses, where Harrison urges his lover to "Let your hair hang all around me ... / Let your love flow and astound me." Musically, the composition features contrasting moods between the ethereal, ballad-like verses and the more strident choruses.

Author Ian Inglis terms "Let It Down" an "unashamedly erotic" song that most likely describes "an act, or acts, of infidelity". "Two lovers hide behind a veil of nonchalance, but both are equally aware of the other's intentions," Inglis suggests, with specific reference to the third verse:

While you look so sweetly and divine
I can feel you here
See your eyes are busy kissing mine ...

The message behind the verses' recurring lines "I do, I do" and "Should someone be looking at me" has invited conflicting interpretations. Leng suggests that in the first of these lines, Harrison might be restating his marriage vow, and that the second line is an early example of the singer viewing his life "as a battle with an unseen enemy waiting to pounce". (Note: While noting that this Harrison world view "passes almost unnoticed" in "Let It Down", Leng writes that its manifestation through images of "hate, conflict, and strife" emerges more fully in Harrison's 1972 composition "The Light That Has Lighted the World", and "verges on paranoia" in songs such as "Who Can See It" and "Grey Cloudy Lies".) To Inglis, the characters in "Let It Down" are engaged in an adulterous affair, with the "constant threat" of being discovered – hence the conclusion to verse one: "Hiding it all behind anything I see / Should someone be looking at me."

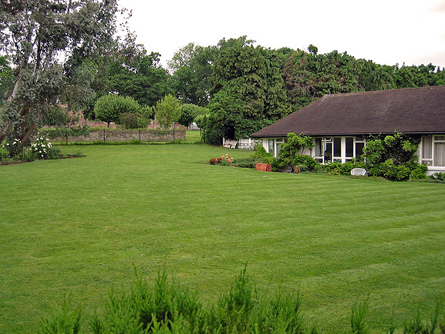
Kinfauns, in Surrey, the Harrisons' home from 1964 to 1970

Harrison biographer Gary Tillery observes of this period when the song was written: "Despite his spiritual hunger, [for Harrison] the temptations of a rock star were still too much to resist. He had affairs with other women, and he became less guarded about them with Pattie." One such affair took place shortly after the couple's return from New York, in December 1968, and involved Charlotte Martin, a French model who had just ended a relationship with Harrison's friend and occasional collaborator Eric Clapton. Harrison invited Martin to stay at Kinfauns, the home he shared with Boyd in Esher, south of London, whereupon, according to Boyd: "She didn't seem remotely upset about Eric ..." (Note: Speaking to Crawdaddy magazine in 1976, two years after Boyd had left him to live with Clapton, Harrison joked that Clapton's courting of his wife had been "Eric trying to get his own back on me", adding: "I pulled his chick once." Clapton later admitted: "I thought that I'd get even with him one day, on a petty level, and it grew from that.")

== The Beatles' Get Back sessions ==
Harrison and Boyd returned to England just before Christmas 1968, ready for the start of the Beatles' ill-fated Get Back film project, released as Let It Be in May 1970, a month after their break-up. On 1 January 1969, author Peter Doggett writes, Harrison arrived at Apple's central London headquarters in an "exuberant" mood, inspired by his recent music-making with Dylan and fellow Woodstock residents the Band, and "enjoying the frisson of sharing his home with two beautiful women".

Harrison put forward "Let It Down", along with as many as nine other compositions, during the Get Back sessions. On 2 January, before the arrival of bandmates Paul McCartney and Ringo Starr for the first day of filming, he debuted the song to John Lennon at Twickenham Film Studios, in south-west London. Tapes from this session reveal Lennon struggling with the song's chord changes, during a run-through that authors Doug Sulpy and Ray Schweighardt describe as an "excellent performance by George ... seriously marred by John's distracting accompaniment on guitar". Once the film project was under way, a combination of Lennon's barbed criticism of Harrison's songwriting and McCartney's attempts to "dominate" him musically, as Starr later put it, resulted in Harrison walking out on 10 January, apparently having quit the band for good. Doggett observes that, for Harrison, there had been "no relief from the tension" that week, since an upset Boyd had recently left Kinfauns to stay with friends in London. (Note: Harrison channelled his frustration with the Beatles into a new song, "Wah-Wah", while domestically, in Doggett's words, "Charlotte Martin was ejected and Pattie reinstated.")

Following Harrison's return to the Beatles, and the film project's relocation to their familiar Apple Studio, the band rehearsed "Let It Down" briefly on 25 and 29 January. Author Bruce Spizer writes of the song being embellished with "gospel-style organ runs", played by future Apple Records artist Billy Preston, during these late January sessions. Although the Beatles dedicated more time to it than to Harrison songs such as "Isn't It a Pity" and "Hear Me Lord", the track was dropped without being recorded, due to a lack of interest from Lennon and McCartney.

=== Phil Spector's involvement ===
After engineer Glyn Johns had failed to compile a satisfactory album from the Get Back tapes throughout 1969, the project passed to American producer Phil Spector, via the latter's connection with Beatles manager Allen Klein. Like Lennon, Harrison welcomed Spector's involvement, and he offered a glowing endorsement of the producer's talents on the sleeve of Ike & Tina Turner's album River Deep – Mountain High. (Note: Demoralised by the commercial failure in America of the Turners' 1966 single "River Deep – Mountain High", Spector had just emerged from self-imposed retirement via an association with A&M Records, who belatedly released the Spector-produced album of the same name. Harrison's endorsement read: "'River Deep – Mountain High' is a perfect record from start to finish. You couldn't improve on it.") In January 1970, Spector was in London discussing the possibility of producing a solo album by Harrison when the latter invited him to a recording session for Lennon's Plastic Ono Band single "Instant Karma!" After this session, Spector urged Harrison to record his album, which would become the triple set All Things Must Pass. In 2011, Spector recalled of the material that Harrison had amassed, such as "Let It Down": "He had literally hundreds of songs, and each one was better than the rest. He had all this emotion built up ... I don't think he had played them to anybody, maybe Pattie."

== Production ==
=== Initial recording ===
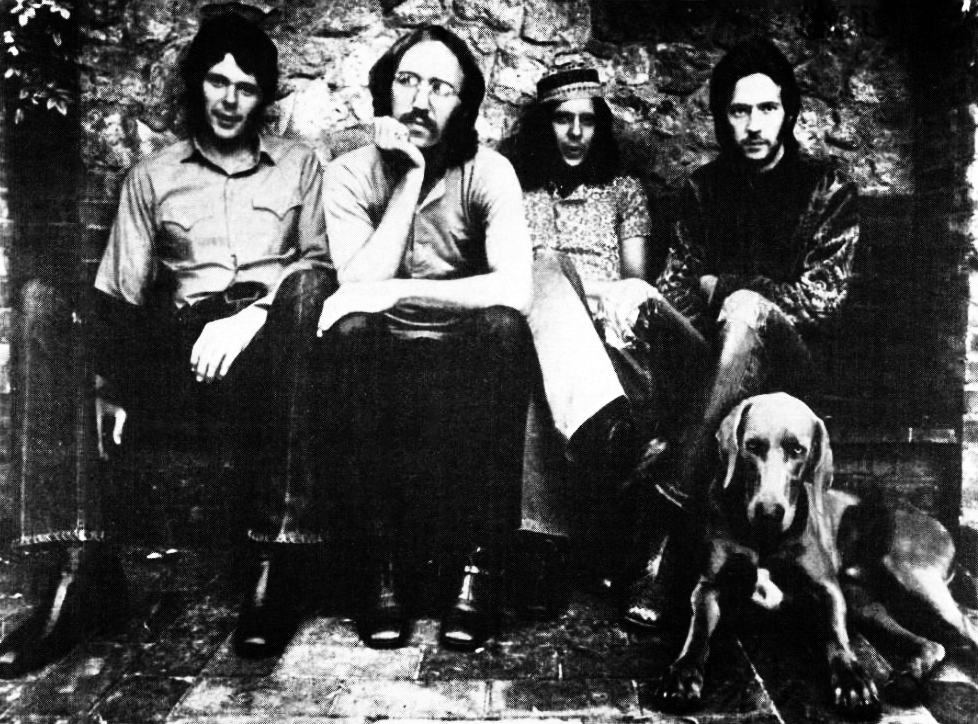
Derek and the Dominos' Jim Gordon, Carl Radle, Bobby Whitlock and Eric Clapton, pictured in 1970

With Spector as his co-producer, Harrison taped the basic track for "Let It Down" in London early in the summer of 1970. Similar to the "libidinous detour" provided by "I Dig Love", Leng views the inclusion of "Let It Down" on All Things Must Pass as "a brief sensory interlude" from the predominant spiritual concerns found on the album. In his discussion of the song, Inglis notes that this period coincided with heightened suspicion on Boyd's part regarding her husband's womanising, while music journalist John Harris has written of there being an element of intrigue during the All Things Must Pass sessions, through Clapton's growing infatuation with Boyd. This development was an open secret to the musicians with whom Clapton formed Derek and the Dominos at this time – his fellow Delaney & Bonnie bandmates Bobby Whitlock, Jim Gordon and Carl Radle – and to an apparently indifferent Harrison. Clapton sought refuge in heroin from his "torment", Harris writes, while pouring his feelings for Boyd into the songs that Derek and the Dominos would soon record for their album Layla and Other Assorted Love Songs (1970). (Note: Whitlock, who began a relationship with Boyd's sister Paula later that year, has commented on a musical dialogue between Harrison and Clapton in their songs: "There were subliminal messages, going back and forth, between two good friends as a way of healing and setting each other free ... I have always known that the better part of those songs [on All Things Must Pass] were directed to Eric, just like Eric's were to George on the Layla record.")

Having also toured with Delaney & Bonnie in December 1969, Harrison used Gordon (on drums), Radle (bass) and the band's horn section, Bobby Keys and Jim Price, on the session for "Let It Down". While Leng and Spizer both credit the Hammond organ and piano parts to Gary Wright and Gary Brooker, respectively, and list Whitlock as a backing vocalist only, Whitlock maintains that he played the organ on the recording, "with the Leslie cranked [up]", and that Billy Preston was the pianist. In addition to Harrison and Clapton on electric guitars, Leng and Spizer list Pete Ham, Tom Evans and Joey Molland of Apple band Badfinger as acoustic rhythm guitarists on the track. (Note: Badfinger's contribution would be almost inaudible, as on much of All Things Must Pass, in keeping with a tenet of Spector's Wall of Sound technique that some instruments should be "felt but not heard".)

He's been a bit outrageous, but he was very sweet. He was like a giant person inside this frail little body ... Most of the stuff I did with Phil, I ended up doing about 80 percent of the work myself. The rest of the time I was trying to get him into hospital ...

— George Harrison, on working with Phil Spector, 1987

With its choruses presented in what Harrison biographer Elliot Huntley describes as "thundering, echo-drenched crescendo", "Let It Down" received a hard rock arrangement that recalls the sound of Wright's former band Spooky Tooth. Like Huntley, authors Chip Madinger and Mark Easter recognise the song as the most obvious example of Spector's influence on the album. In their book Eight Arms to Hold You, Madinger and Easter also credit the producer with "creating havoc" during the making of All Things Must Pass. According to Harrison's later recollections and those of Molland, Klaus Voormann and orchestral arranger John Barham, Spector's erratic behaviour and alcohol intake became a further burden on Harrison, alongside his marital problems and the death of his mother in July 1970. During a session at Apple Studio, Spector fell over and broke his arm; that and other "health issues" left Harrison to do much of the production work alone through to 12 August. (Note: Spector's idiosyncrasies were also an issue during the making of Lennon's Plastic Ono Band album in September–October 1970, when Allen Klein was forced to advertise in Billboard magazine in order to get the producer to attend the sessions. By the time Spector arrived in London, recording was almost finished.)

=== Overdubbing and mixing ===
While convalescing in Los Angeles, Spector wrote to Harrison with ideas for each of the early mixes completed in his absence, leaving his most detailed suggestions for "Let It Down". Once Spector had returned to London, later in August, he and Harrison worked at Trident Studios, overseeing remixes as the recordings were transferred from 8- to 16-track tape – a process that allowed for greater flexibility when overdubbing further instruments and vocal parts. Among the subsequent overdubs on "Let It Down", Keys added "a wailing sax (old rock and roll style)", as the producer had described it in his letter, to complement "all that madness at the end [of the song]". Barham's string arrangements for All Things Must Pass were also recorded at this point; in the case of "Let It Down", former Melody Maker editor Richard Williams has written of Barham and Spector "extract[ing] a very unusual texture" from their combination of strings and horns.

In Leng's description, the finished recording opens with Harrison's "heaviest-ever intro" – the "shattering concoction" of Harrison and Clapton's "angry" guitar riffs, "sledgehammer" drums from Gordon, and Wright's "roaring" Hammond organ – before the music "slips into the cool waters of a balmy, smooth sensuality" for the first verse. The horns similarly adopt contrasting musical textures, providing a soft, "Moonlight Bay"-like setting, as Spector put it, during the song's quieter moments. From its aggressive sound over the intro and choruses, Harrison's slide guitar reverts to a warmer tone, on a track that Leng views as Harrison developing his "unique voice" on slide guitar. Leng also highlights the "gospel passion" of Clapton and Whitlock's vocal contributions, as the so-called "George O'Hara-Smith Singers".

== Release and reception ==
The Beatles' loss is Harrison's gain. The guitarist had brought songs such as "All Things Must Pass," "Let It Down" and "Isn't It a Pity" to the Beatles in their fractious final months, only to have them rejected ... Instead, they end[ed] up on this audacious coming-out party ...

— Greg Kot in Rolling Stone, January 2002

"Let It Down" was released on All Things Must Pass in November 1970, sequenced between the two minimalist, Band-influenced tracks "Behind That Locked Door" and "Run of the Mill". Writing in 1977 of the acclaim afforded the album on release, author Nicholas Schaffner described All Things Must Pass as the "crowning glory" of Harrison and Spector's respective careers, and concluded: "Spector was at last working with a talent comparable with his own. The producer's cosmic sound proved a perfect complement to the artist's cosmic vision." Author Robert Rodriguez groups "Let It Down" with other Beatles-era compositions such as "All Things Must Pass", "Isn't It a Pity" and "Wah-Wah", as the "essential components" of an album that was "revelatory, helping the public understand that, with a talent this big alongside two acknowledged geniuses [in Lennon and McCartney], no wonder the group could not remain intact". In his album review for the NME, Alan Smith noted "Let It Down"'s "big fuzzy" introduction against its verses' "quiet acid float" and admired the "romantic delicacy and perception" of Harrison's lyrics. "No matter the quality of the music," Smith added, "his words never let him down."

In a retrospective review for Rolling Stone, James Hunter cited the "grooving" performance on "Let It Down" as an example of how All Things Must Pass represents "a rock orchestra recorded with sensitivity and teeth and faraway mikes". Writing for Rough Guides, Chris Ingham considers that without Spector's Wall of Sound excesses, Harrison's triple album "wouldn't be the magnificently overblown item that it is". Ingham comments on "the sheer size of the sound" on tracks such as "Let It Down", "Wah-Wah" and "What Is Life", all of which "build up a head of steam that could only be generated by multiple live takes of dozens of musicians playing their hearts out".

Bruce Spizer has written of the "unfortunate" decision that saw "Let It Down" rejected by the Beatles in 1969, since "it is one of George's most exquisite and sensual love songs." Elliot Huntley finds the same decision "perverse" and enthuses: "I simply don't have enough hyperbole for 'Let It Down' ... Spector really earns his corn on this track ..." Huntley writes that the song's much-admired "soft/loud approach" would be "ripped off by every indie band in the world a generation later", a point to which John Bergstrom of PopMatters adds: "How many guitar-driven, echo-drenched bands have come around since [All Things Must Pass], mixing powerful rave-ups with moody, reflective down-tempo numbers and a spiritual bent? ... [One] listen to 'Let It Down', and you'll understand a big part of how 'Dream Pop' came to be."

Also impressed with the song's musical moods, Ian Inglis writes: "The switches between periods of pulsating rhythm and interludes of musical calm echo the ebb and flow of seduction itself. Like a painter who uses contrasting colors to create tension and movement, Harrison is ... using the tools of the songwriter to create a dynamic and passionate depiction of lust and desire." Madinger and Easter describe the track as "an absolutely apocalyptic production" and "the best example of Spector running rampant with the 'Wall of Sound'". Writing in his book Phil Spector: Out of His Head, Richard Williams views "Let It Down" as "the record's most thrilling track", adding that it "picks the listener up and, in the best Spector tradition, never lets him down, building an electrifying tension between the subdued, reverential verses and the roaring chorus". In September 2014, the song appeared as Harrison's selection on the solo Beatles EP 4: John Paul George Ringo, exclusive to iTunes.

== Other versions ==
=== Alternative mixes ===
Madinger and Easter write of the revelatory nature of the various rough mixes of "Let It Down", which were made at different stages of the recording process and first issued, unofficially, during the mid-1990s. Available on bootleg compilations such as the multi-disc Making of All Things Must Pass and Songs for Patti – The Mastertape Version, the mixes demonstrate the layers of instrumentation that were combined to form the commercially released recording – ranging from a sparse backing of just guitar, bass and drums, to the larger sound following brass and slide guitar overdubs. Madinger and Easter write that "Let It Down" was "a much rougher, rockin' track in its initial phase", and the mixes provide a "fascinating view" of how the song could have ended up without the heavy production favoured by Spector. AllMusic critic Bruce Eder similarly admires the "raw band track", where the mix "puts Harrison's voice up real close where it sounds amazingly good".

=== Acoustic version ===
At London's Abbey Road Studios on 20 May 1970, Harrison performed "Let It Down" among a selection of songs for Spector, with a view to narrowing down the amount of material that they would be recording for All Things Must Pass. Along with compositions that have yet to see release, including "Window, Window", "Nowhere to Go", "Cosmic Empire" and "Mother Divine", this solo acoustic version of "Let It Down" became available in 1994 on a bootleg titled Beware of ABKCO! In January 2001, Harrison included the song, along with a similar run-through of "Beware of Darkness", as one of five bonus tracks on the 30th anniversary reissue of All Things Must Pass; (Note: Although EMI had announced a 21 November 2000 release, close to the actual anniversary date, the reissue was delayed until 22 January 2001.) in his liner notes, he states that he had been unaware that the session was ever recorded. Harrison added acoustic lead guitar to the song, as well as a string-synthesizer part played by Ray Cooper, both recorded at Harrison's home studio, FPSHOT, during 2000.

While viewed as an "inessential" extra by Hunter in his review for Rolling Stone, this alternative version does provide "a taste of fluid, jazzy Harrison guitar", Leng writes. Titled "Let It Down (Alternate Version)", it also appears on the 2014 Apple Years 1968–75 reissue of All Things Must Pass. On the website Something Else!, Nick DeRiso writes of Harrison's stated regret at Spector's overuse of reverberation on the album, and opines that "[This] stripped-down version of 'Let It Down' best illustrates how so much of Harrison's pent-up songcraft instantly resonated, even as first drafts."

=== Cover versions ===
In 2010, Brazilian singer Maria Gadú contributed an acoustic version of "Let It Down" to Tudo Passa, a Harrison tribute album recorded by various Brazilian musicians. Backed by the band Big Black Delta, Harrison's son Dhani performed the song on the US television show Conan in September 2014. This appearance was part of the show's "George Harrison Week", celebrating the release of the Apple Years 1968–75 box set. Dhani Harrison subsequently performed the song at George Fest, a multi-artist concert tribute to his father's music, held at the Fonda Theatre, Los Angeles, on 28 September that same year.

== Personnel ==
According to Simon Leng and Bruce Spizer, the musicians who performed on "Let It Down" are as follows:

- George Harrison – vocals, electric guitar, slide guitar, backing vocals
- Eric Clapton – electric guitar, backing vocals
- Gary Wright – organ
- Gary Brooker – piano
- Carl Radle – bass
- Jim Gordon – drums
- Bobby Keys – saxophones
- Jim Price – trumpet, trombone, horn arrangement
- John Barham – string arrangement
- Pete Ham – acoustic guitar
- Tom Evans – acoustic guitar
- Joey Molland – acoustic guitar
- uncredited – shaker
- Bobby Whitlock – backing vocals

== Sources ==
- Keith Badman, The Beatles Diary Volume 2: After the Break-Up 1970–2001, Omnibus Press (London, 2001; ISBN 0-7119-8307-0).
- Pattie Boyd (with Penny Junor), Wonderful Today: The Autobiography, Headline Review (London, 2007; ISBN 978-0-7553-1646-5).
- Harry Castleman & Walter J. Podrazik, All Together Now: The First Complete Beatles Discography 1961–1975, Ballantine Books (New York, NY, 1976; ISBN 0-345-25680-8).
- Alan Clayson, George Harrison, Sanctuary (London, 2003; ISBN 1-86074-489-3).
- Eric Clapton, Eric Clapton: The Autobiography, Random House (New York, NY, 2008; ISBN 978-0-09-950549-5).
- Peter Doggett, You Never Give Me Your Money: The Beatles After the Breakup, It Books (New York, NY, 2011; ISBN 978-0-06-177418-8).
- The Editors of Rolling Stone, Harrison, Rolling Stone Press/Simon & Schuster (New York, NY, 2002; ISBN 0-7432-3581-9).
- Joshua M. Greene, Here Comes the Sun: The Spiritual and Musical Journey of George Harrison, John Wiley & Sons (Hoboken, NJ, 2006; ISBN 978-0-470-12780-3).
- John Harris, "A Quiet Storm", Mojo, July 2001, pp. 66–74.
- George Harrison, I Me Mine, Chronicle Books (San Francisco, CA, 2002; ISBN 0-8118-3793-9).
- Olivia Harrison, George Harrison: Living in the Material World, Abrams (New York, NY, 2011; ISBN 978-1-4197-0220-4).
- Elliot J. Huntley, Mystical One: George Harrison – After the Break-up of the Beatles, Guernica Editions (Toronto, ON, 2006; ISBN 1-55071-197-0).
- Chris Ingham, The Rough Guide to the Beatles, Rough Guides/Penguin (London, 2006; 2nd edn; ISBN 978-1-8483-6525-4).
- Ian Inglis, The Words and Music of George Harrison, Praeger (Santa Barbara, CA, 2010; ISBN 978-0-313-37532-3).
- Simon Leng, While My Guitar Gently Weeps: The Music of George Harrison, Hal Leonard (Milwaukee, WI, 2006; ISBN 1-4234-0609-5).
- Ian MacDonald, Revolution in the Head: The Beatles' Records and the Sixties, Pimlico (London, 1998; ISBN 0-7126-6697-4).
- Chip Madinger & Mark Easter, Eight Arms to Hold You: The Solo Beatles Compendium, 44.1 Productions (Chesterfield, MO, 2000; ISBN 0-615-11724-4).
- Barry Miles, The Beatles Diary Volume 1: The Beatles Years, Omnibus Press (London, 2001; ISBN 0-7119-8308-9).
- The New Rolling Stone Encyclopedia of Rock & Roll, Fireside/Rolling Stone Press (New York, NY, 1995; ISBN 0-684-81044-1).
- Chris O'Dell (with Katherine Ketcham), Miss O'Dell: My Hard Days and Long Nights with The Beatles, The Stones, Bob Dylan, Eric Clapton, and the Women They Loved, Touchstone (New York, NY, 2009; ISBN 978-1-4165-9093-4).
- Jan Reid, Layla and Other Assorted Love Songs by Derek and the Dominos, Rodale (New York, NY, 2006; ISBN 978-1-59486-369-1).
- Mark Ribowsky, He's a Rebel: Phil Spector – Rock and Roll's Legendary Producer, Da Capo Press (Cambridge, MA, 2006; ISBN 978-0-306-81471-6).
- Robert Rodriguez, Fab Four FAQ 2.0: The Beatles' Solo Years, 1970–1980, Backbeat Books (Milwaukee, WI, 2010; ISBN 978-1-4165-9093-4).
- Nicholas Schaffner, The Beatles Forever, McGraw-Hill (New York, NY, 1978; ISBN 0-07-055087-5).
- Bruce Spizer, The Beatles Solo on Apple Records, 498 Productions (New Orleans, LA, 2005; ISBN 0-9662649-5-9).
- Doug Sulpy & Ray Schweighardt, Get Back: The Unauthorized Chronicle of The Beatles' Let It Be Disaster, St. Martin's Griffin (New York, 1997; ISBN 0-312-19981-3).
- Gary Tillery, Working Class Mystic: A Spiritual Biography of George Harrison, Quest Books (Wheaton, IL, 2011; ISBN 978-0-8356-0900-5).
- Bobby Whitlock (with Marc Roberty), Bobby Whitlock: A Rock 'n' Roll Autobiography, McFarland (Jefferson, NC, 2010; ISBN 978-0-7864-6190-5).
- Richard Williams, Phil Spector: Out of His Head, Omnibus Press (London, 2003; ISBN 978-0-7119-9864-3).
