= A Different Kind of Weather =

1990 studio album by the Dream Academy

Studio album by The Dream Academy
- Released: 15 June 1990
- Recorded: 1990
- Studios: Strongroom and Astoria (London, UK)
- Genre: Rock
- Length: 43:13
- Labels: Reprise (US); Blanco y Negro (UK)
- Producers: David Gilmour (main); Nick Laird-Clowes; Gilbert Gabriel; Stephen Lambert; Anthony Moore

The Dream Academy chronology
Remembrance Days (1987)	A Different Kind of Weather (1990)	Somewhere in the Sun... Best of the Dream Academy (2000)

Professional ratings
Review scores
Source	Rating
AllMusic	4/5 stars
The Encyclopedia of Popular Music	2/5 stars
Orlando Sentinel	1/5 stars
Ottawa Citizen	4/5 stars
Record Mirror	6/10
The Rolling Stone Album Guide	2/5 stars

A Different Kind of Weather is the third and final studio album by the English band the Dream Academy. It was released on 15 June 1990 by Reprise and Blanco y Negro Records. The album saw the return of David Gilmour as the main producer, six years after he had produced their debut album.

The album failed to enter the charts, despite the band performing their first and only tour of the United Kingdom to promote its release, in 1991.

== Critical reception ==
Trouser Press wrote that "[Kate] St. John’s oboe and soprano sax is an effective antidote to blandness, but the languid material is almost characterless, relegating the album to handsomely accomplished ambience for the old at heart." The Globe and Mail wrote that the album "harks back to the days of the British progressives without specifically copying any one band."

== Track listing ==
No.	Title	Writer(s)	Length
1.	"Love"	John Lennon	3:43
2.	"Mercy Killing"	Laird-Clowes, Gabriel	4:44
3.	"Lucy September"	Laird-Clowes, Gabriel	3:06
4.	"Gaby Says"	Laird-Clowes, Gabriel	5:04
5.	"Waterloo"	Laird-Clowes, Gabriel	5:04
6.	"Twelve-eight Angel"	Laird-Clowes, Gilmour	4:19
7.	"St. Valentine's Day"	Laird-Clowes, Gabriel	2:45
8.	"It'll Never Happen Again"	Tim Hardin	3:33
9.	"Forest Fire"	Laird-Clowes, Gabriel	4:15
10.	"Lowlands"	Laird-Clowes, Gabriel	3:47
11.	"Not for Second Prize"	Laird-Clowes	2:53

== Singles from the album ==
- "Love"
- "Angel of Mercy" ("Twelve-eight Angel")

== Personnel ==
The Dream Academy

- Gilbert Gabriel – keyboards (1–8, 10), vocals (2, 10), bass overdub (7), additional keyboards (9)
- Nick Laird-Clowes – lead vocals (1–5, 7–11), guitar jangles (2), guitars (3, 4, 6–8, 10, 11), vocals (6), acoustic piano (9), banjo (10)
- Kate St. John – vocals (1–4, 6–11), oboe (4, 7), soprano saxophone (5, 6), fuzz oboe solo (6), cor anglais (7, 8)

Additional musicians

- Anthony Moore – programming (4, 5)
- Steve Lambert – guitars (1), stick harp (1, 9, 10)
- David Gilmour – guitar [seagulls & whales] (2), guitars (6, 9), synth bass (6), vocals (6, 8), guitar solo (8), bass (8)
- David Coulter – ukulele (5)
- Guy Pratt – bass (2, 3, 10)
- Pino Palladino – bass (7, 9)
- Simon Tyrell – drum programming (1), additional drum programming (2)
- Pete Thomas – drums (2, 3, 7–9), tambourine (2)
- Jon Carin – additional drum programming (3), additional keyboards on ending (4), additional keyboard programming (5), keyboards (6, 9), programming (6, 9), organ (7)
- Gary Wallis – drums (10)
- Muzzy Ismail – Tibetan temple bells (1)
- Benedict Hoffnung – percussion (9), military snare (10), timpani (10)
- Gaurangi Devi Dasi – vocals (1)
- Poly Styrene – vocal chant (1)

== Production ==
- Nick Laird-Clowes – producer
- Gilbert Gabriel – producer (1)
- Steve Lambert – producer (1)
- David Gilmour – producer (2–11)
- Anthony Moore – producer (2–11)
- "Chips" – engineer (1)
- Andy Jackson – engineer (2–11)
- Stephen Marcussen – mastering at Precision Mastering (Hollywood, California, USA)
- John Warwicker – art direction, design
- Peter Calvin – photography
- Graham Wood – typography
- Steve Fargnoli – management
- James Tod – management
