= Tarquin Gotch =

British entertainment industry executive

Tarquin Gotch is a British entertainment industry executive, having worked in the music and later on in film business since the late 1970s.

== Music ==
Gotch started his career in London as a tour manager for the band Alphalpha and singer Clive Sarstedt. He then became a music publisher at Pendulum Music with acts like Tony Ashton. Gotch then joined Arista Records as an A&R executive, signing groups like Secret Affair. Clive Davis soon made Gotch head of A&R where, as well as overseeing Simple Minds and the Thompson Twins, he signed The Stray Cats, The Beat, Elaine Paige, Fela Kuti and Rowan Atkinson. He produced Atkinson's first live album and was the first to produce a film of Rowan's live show.

From Arista, Gotch moved to WEA where he signed The Associates. He also transitioned American acts such as Prince, Madonna, Shalamar to the UK. In the mid-1980s, Gotch moved to management and built up a stable of acts including The Beat, Stephen Duffy, The Dream Academy, Hugh Harris, General Public and XTC. Since most of these acts sold especially well in the US, he found himself frequently in Los Angeles and it was there that, through his friend Kelly Le Brock, he met the director and writer John Hughes.

For the next seven years he continued to manage but also to music supervise most of John Hughes' films. These included Some Kind of Wonderful, She's Having a Baby, Uncle Buck, Planes, Trains and Automobiles. Gotch also supervised music for the first few episodes of the TV series The Wonder Years. He also added some American acts to the management roster, including Roger McGuinn and The Horse Flies.

== Film and television ==
In the early 1990s, Gotch was asked by John Hughes to move to Chicago to run his film company, Hughes Entertainment. During the next three and a half years, Gotch was Executive Producer on Curly Sue, “Planes, Trains and Automobiles, Dutch, Only the Lonely and Home Alone. Gotch then moved to Los Angeles the next two years to work on projects with John Candy. However, due to the actor's death, none of the projects ever became films.

Gotch was then reunited with Peter Faiman at Fox and was an Executive Producer of the four-hour mini series Love and Betrayal: The Mia Farrow Story for Fox Television. On the back of the success of this project, Fox hired Gotch to run their in-house TV movie division "Fox Circle Productions". Gotch oversaw the production of nine TV films including Vanishing Point, Nick Fury: Agent of S.H.I.E.L.D. (a film based on Marvel Comic's hero Nick Fury), and The O. J. Simpson Story.

Concurrently, Gotch was also managing the career of Jimmy Nail in the UK, both as an actor and as singer. Gotch also produced, in the UK, two series of Crocodile Shoes, starring Nail, for the BBC.

With Jimmy Nail, Gotch created the BBC television comedy series Parents of the Band. With Steve Dagger, Gotch was Associate Producer on Still Crazy for Columbia Tristar. He was Executive Producer of the German independent film 'Eidelwiess Piraten' that had its world premiere at the Montreal World Film Festival in August 2004. Gotch was hired by the Exodus Film Group as a consultant and supervised the music for the original Sydney production of the stage musical of Priscilla, Queen of the Desert.

In 2014, Gotch was the executive producer of a documentary on Porridge for UKTV.

== Filmography ==
Writer

- Brothers (2007, Imperia Films Inc) (co-writer)

Executive producer

- Home Alone (1990, 20th Century Fox)
- Dutch (1991, 20th Century Fox)
- Only the Lonely (1991, 20th Century Fox)
- Curly Sue (1992, Warner Bros.)
- Edelweiss Pirate (2004, Palladio Films)
- Paul Bunyan (2006, Exodus Films)

Associate producer

- Still Crazy (1998, Sony Tristar)
