= 4: John Paul George Ringo =

EP / Compilation album by the Beatles
- Released: 23 September 2014
- Recorded: Various
- Studio: Various
- Genre: Rock
- Length: 18:05
- Label: Universal Music
- Producer: Various

4: John Paul George Ringo is a digital extended play compilation released on 23 September 2014, as a free download by the iTunes Store. It features one solo song by each former member of the Beatles: John Lennon, Paul McCartney, George Harrison and Ringo Starr. It is the first official release to bring together their solo material (though two Starr solo albums, Ringo and Ringo's Rotogravure, and the 1996 Carl Perkins album Go Cat Go! featured contributions from each of the four).

The EP was released to promote the iTunes remastering of several solo albums by each former Beatle. It is no longer available for purchase.

== Background ==
As early as 1971, the year after the Beatles broke up, Lennon suggested that disappointed fans could compile the former members’ solo material themselves to create new "Beatles" records:

"If people need the Beatles so much, all they have to do is to buy each album and ... put it on tape, track by track, one of me, one of Paul, one of George, one of Ringo, if they really need it that much. Because otherwise the music is the same, only on separate albums."

The compilers of the 1972 bootleg Alpha Omega came close to achieving that, by adding Lennon's "Imagine", Harrison's "Bangla Desh" and McCartney's "Maybe I'm Amazed", along with other songs by the three former bandmates, to the Beatles hits that made up the bulk of the compilation. Alpha Omega appears to be the first commercial release of any sort to include solo material from different ex-Beatles.

But when Apple responded to Alpha Omega with the 1973 compilations 1962–1966 and 1967–1970, it did not follow the bootleggers' example. Although there was no contractual barrier to including solo material – the former Beatles remained committed to EMI as individuals until January 1976 – those compilations and every subsequent authorised Beatles collection were limited to Beatles material. Over time, EMI released separate solo compilations for each of the four former Beatles. Some of these included the artist's Beatles songs, but none included solo material by other former Beatles.

In September 2014, iTunes released newly remastered versions of several of the former Beatles' key solo albums. 4: John Paul George Ringo was released as a free download sampler to promote the remastering. The EP was credited to "various artists"; the name "Beatles" did not appear in the digital packaging.

The tracks span 39 years, from Harrison's "Let It Down", from his 1970 album All Things Must Pass, to Starr's "Walk with You", released as a single in 2009. Lennon's "Love" is from the 1970 album John Lennon/Plastic Ono Band; McCartney's "Call Me Back Again" is from the 1975 Wings album Venus and Mars.

The cover of 4: John Paul George Ringo echoes that of 1, the Beatles' 2000 compilation. Where 1 features a red cover with a large painted numeral 1 and the credit "The Beatles", 4: John Paul George Ringo features a blue cover with a large painted numeral 4 and the former bandmates' first names. The cover also includes solo-era portraits of each of the four.

While all of the tracks were well known to fans, only Starr's "Walk with You" had been released as a single, and none were among the artists' best-known hits.

Starr's "Walk with You" features McCartney on bass and additional vocals.

== Track listing ==
| No. | Title | Writer(s) | Artist | Length |
|---|---|---|---|---|
| 1. | "Love" | John Lennon | John Lennon | 3:23 |
| 2. | "Call Me Back Again" | Paul McCartney, Linda McCartney | Wings | 5:01 |
| 3. | "Let It Down" | George Harrison | George Harrison | 5:00 |
| 4. | "Walk with You" | Richard Starkey, Van Dyke Parks | Ringo Starr | 4:41 |

== Personnel ==
"Love"

- John Lennon – vocals, acoustic guitar
- Phil Spector – piano

"Call Me Back Again"

- Paul McCartney – vocals, bass, guitars, keyboards, piano
- Linda McCartney – keyboards, backing vocals
- Denny Laine – guitars, keyboards
- Jimmy McCulloch – guitars
- Joe English – drums

"Let It Down"

- George Harrison – vocals, electric guitar, slide guitar, backing vocals
- Eric Clapton – electric guitar, backing vocals
- Gary Wright – organ
- Gary Brooker – piano
- Carl Radle – bass
- Jim Gordon – drums
- Bobby Keys – saxophones
- Jim Price – trumpet, trombone, horn arrangement
- John Barham – string arrangement
- Pete Ham – acoustic guitar
- Tom Evans – acoustic guitar
- Joey Molland – acoustic guitar
- uncredited – shaker
- Bobby Whitlock – backing vocals

"Walk with You"

- Ringo Starr – drums, vocals, background vocals, percussion
- Paul McCartney – additional vocals, bass
- Steve Dudas – guitar
- Ann Marie Calhoun – violin
- Bruce Sugar – keyboards, string arrangement
