= The Edge of Forever (The Dream Academy song) =

Single by The Dream Academy

from the album The Dream Academy
- Released: 1985 (US)
- Recorded: 1984
- Genre: Rock, sophisti-pop
- Length: 4:23
- Label: Warner Bros.
- Songwriters: Nick Laird-Clowes, Gilbert Gabriel
- Producers: David Gilmour and Nick Laird-Clowes

The Dream Academy singles chronology
"Life in a Northern Town" (1985)	"The Edge of Forever" (1985)	"This World" (1985)

"The Edge of Forever" is a song by The Dream Academy from their eponymous first album, released in 1985.

Originally, the song was only released as a promotional single. However, a brief excerpt was used under dialogue near the end of the 1986 film Ferris Bueller's Day Off, and the song appears on the limited-edition soundtrack album released in 2016.

== Chart performance ==
Chart (1986)	Peak position
US Top Tracks (Billboard)	37
