= Renditions (album) =

Studio album by Slow Moving Millie
- Released: 9 December 2011 (Download); 12 December 2011 (CD)
- Recorded: State Of The Ark Studios, The Pool, Snap Studios
- Genre: Indie, Alternative
- Length: 35:59
- Label: Island Records, Universal Records

Singles from Renditions
- 1. "Beasts" Released: 14 August 2009; 2. "Please, Please, Please, Let Me Get What I Want" Released: 11 November 2011

Renditions is the debut studio album by Amelia Warner under the name Slow Moving Millie. The album features the songs 'Please Please Please Let Me Get What I Want' which was the song for the John Lewis 2011 Christmas advert, and 'Beasts' which was used in a Virgin Media TV advert. The first eight tracks on the album are covers but 'Beasts' and 'Hart With A Crown & Chain' were written by Amelia Warner and are original tracks for the album. After the first week of release, the album entered the UK Albums Chart at number 89.

== Singles ==
- "Beasts" was released as the album's lead single on 14 August 2009. The song was used for a Virgin Media television commercial.
- "Please, Please, Please, Let Me Get What I Want" was released as the album's second single on 11 November 2011. It peaked at number 31 on the UK Singles Chart. The song was selected as the soundtrack to the John Lewis 2011 Christmas advertisement.

== Track listing ==
No.	Title	Writer(s)	Length
1.	"Please, Please, Please, Let Me Get What I Want"	Steven Morrissey, Johnny Marr	2:54
2.	"Hold Me Now"	Tom Bailey, Alannah Currie, Joseph Martin Leeway	3:38
3.	"Love In The First Degree"	Sarah Dallin, Keren Woodward, Siobhan Fahey, Mike Stock, Matt Aitken, Pete Waterman	3:33
4.	"Head Over Heels"	Roland Orzabal, Curt Smith	3:37
5.	"The Power Of Love"	Peter Gill, Holly Johnson, Mark O'Toole, Brian Nash	4:13
6.	"Don't Go"	Eric Radcliffe, Daniel Miller, Vince Clarke	3:11
7.	"Wonderful Life"	Colin Vearncombe	3:49
8.	"Feels Like Heaven"	Eddie Jordan, Kevin Patterson	3:10
9.	"Beasts"	Amelia Warner	3:15
10.	"Hart With A Crown & Chain"	Amelia Warner	4:39
Total length:			34:15

== Reception ==
Professional ratings
Review scores
Source	Rating
Allmusic	3.5/5 stars
The Arts Desk	2/5 stars

John O'Brien of AllMusic gave 3.5 stars out of 5 for the album.

== Chart performance ==
Chart (2011)	Peak position
UK Albums Chart	89

== Release history ==
Region	Date	Format
United Kingdom	9 December 2011	Digital download
United Kingdom	12 December 2011	CD
