= Parents of the Band =

2008 British sitcom

- Genre: Sitcom
- Created by: Jimmy Nail; Tarquin Gotch
- Written by: David Cummings; Dick Clement; Ian La Frenais
- Directed by: Dominic Brigstocke
- Starring: Jimmy Nail; Peter Losasso
- Theme music composer: Gary Kemp; Jimmy Nail
- Opening theme: "I Cry (Don't You Read the Papers?)"
- Composer: Mark Hinton Stewart
- Country of origin: United Kingdom
- Original language: English
- No. of series: 1
- No. of episodes: 6

Production
- Executive producers: Kenton Allen; Jimmy Nail; Tarquin Gotch
- Producer: Charlie Hanson
- Cinematography: Martin Hawkins
- Editor: Richard Halladey
- Camera setup: Louise Edmunds
- Running time: 30 Mins
- Production companies: BBC Vision Productions; Serious Entertainment Productions

Original release
- Network: BBC One
- Release: 28 November 2008 – 9 January 2009

Parents of the Band is a 2008 British comedy television series, created by Jimmy Nail and Tarquin Gotch and shown on BBC One. The show stars Jimmy Nail, and is set around a teenage musical band, which each band member's parents are trying to manage.

== Plot ==
Phil Parker (Nail) is the father of Jack (Peter Losasso), who is a drummer in a teen band with a number of his friends. Phil is recently separated from his wife Marketa (Young) and was in a 'one-hit wonder' band in the 1980s, with the song "I Cry". Jack and his band simply want to jam and have fun, but their parents are standing in the way, not because they disapprove, but because they also want to be a part of the rock-star lifestyle. Ultimately the band enter into a talent contest.

== Development ==
The six-episode series was commissioned by Lucy Lumsden, BBC Controller, Comedy Commissioning. The show was a co-venture between BBC Vision Productions and Serious Entertainment Productions. The latter company is owned by the series co-creators, Jimmy Nail and Tarquin Gotch. The series was written by David Cummings, and the script was edited by the writing partners, Dick Clement and Ian La Frenais. The producer is Charlie Hanson and executive producer is Kenton Allen, BBC Creative Head of Comedy Talent and Comedy North.

Jimmy Nail composed the theme music with Gary Kemp, of the eighties synth-pop band Spandau Ballet. A music video for the song "I Cry" was also posted on the show's BBC website.

== Cast ==
- Jimmy Nail as Phil Parker
- Peter Losasso as Jack Parker
- Nina Young as Marketa
- Cascade Brown as Shania
- Niky Wardley as Sandy Soutakis
- David Barseghian as Eddie Soutakis
- Lucinda Dryzek as Lucy Soutakis
- Nicola Hughes as Carmen Cunningham
- Colin McFarlane as Ashton Cunningham
- Franz Drameh as Granville Cunningham
- Michael Karim as Adi Kundra
- Geoffrey McGivern as Kipper Hitchcock

== Broadcast ==
The first episode aired on 28 November 2008 at 8:30pm on BBC One. On BBC One Scotland, and BBC One Northern Ireland however, the show aired at various times on Fridays. Each episode of Parents of the Band also aired in High-definition on BBC HD a week after its BBC One showing. The first episode received 2.61 million (11.2%) viewers. Episode 2 gained an additional 250,000 viewers, with 2.86m (12.7%). The final episode of series one aired on 9 January 2009.

== Episodes ==
No.	Title	Written by	Original release date	UK viewers (millions)
1	"Episode 1"	David Cummings, Dick Clement & Ian La Frenais	28 November 2008	2.61
Jack and his friends form a band, and while practising their parents decide to become the band's management.
2	"Episode 2"	David Cummings, Dick Clement & Ian La Frenais	5 December 2008	2.86
The band cannot decide on a name for themselves, even though they have their first gig. It is at Adi's birthday party, which he insists that he sings at. Phil gets hit by a chair at the end and goes to hospital.
3	"Episode 3"	David Cummings, Dick Clement & Ian La Frenais	12 December 2008	N/A
The school has a work experience week, and the band each go to work with each others' parents. Phil discovers that Jack has been smoking, and agrees to give up coffee if he stops smoking.
4	"Episode 4"	David Cummings, Dick Clement & Ian La Frenais	19 December 2008	N/A
A Danish singer called Inge is asked by Phil to be the new singer for the band, but he does not consult the other parents.
5	"Episode 5"	David Cummings, Dick Clement & Ian La Frenais	2 January 2009	N/A
Jack's father Phil gets the band to play for his parents' 50th wedding anniversary. Phil's father passes out during the performance.
6	"Episode 6"	David Cummings, Dick Clement & Ian La Frenais	9 January 2009	N/A
The band, now called One, Two, Three, Four, enter a talent contest at their school, while getting the attention of a competing girl group. Klariza Clayton guest stars.
