= William, It Was Really Nothing =

1984 song by the Smiths

- Artwork for original 1984 single release, also used for 2008 re-release

Single by the Smiths
- B-side: "How Soon Is Now?"; "Please, Please, Please, Let Me Get What I Want"
- Released: 20 August 1984
- Recorded: July 1984
- Studio: Jam (London)
- Genre: Alternative rock
- Length: 2:09
- Label: Rough Trade
- Composer: Johnny Marr
- Lyricist: Morrissey
- Producer: John Porter

The Smiths singles chronology
"Heaven Knows I'm Miserable Now" (1984)	"William, It Was Really Nothing" (1984)	"How Soon Is Now?" (1985)

Professional ratings
Review scores
Source	Rating
AllMusic	4/5 stars

"William, It Was Really Nothing" is a song by the English rock band The Smiths. It was released as a single in August 1984, featuring the B-sides "Please, Please, Please, Let Me Get What I Want" and "How Soon Is Now?", and reached No. 17 in the UK Singles Chart. The song is featured on the compilation albums Hatful of Hollow and Louder Than Bombs, as well as other best of and singles collections. In 2004, the song was ranked No. 425 on Rolling Stone magazine's list of the 500 greatest songs of all time.

When the band performed the song on Top of the Pops, Morrissey ripped open his shirt to reveal the words "MARRY ME" written on his chest ("Would you like to marry me?" is one line of the song).

== Lyrics and background ==
Morrissey has said of the song: "It occurred to me that within popular music if ever there were any records that discussed marriage they were always from the female's standpoint, female singers singing to women. There were never any songs saying 'do not marry, stay single, self-preservation,' etc. I thought it was about time there was a male voice speaking directly to another male saying that marriage was a waste of time ... that, in fact, it was absolutely nothing."

The song is popularly believed to have been about Morrissey's short-lived friendship with Billy Mackenzie, lead singer of the Associates. The Associates' compilation album Double Hipness, released in August 2000, included the song "Stephen, You're Really Something", recorded by Billy MacKenzie and Alan Rankine during the band's reunion in 1993 as a response to "William, It Was Really Nothing".

== Track listing ==
7" RT166
No.	Title	Length
1.	"William, It Was Really Nothing"	2:10
2.	"Please, Please, Please, Let Me Get What I Want"	1:50

- in original green sleeve

7" RT166
No.	Title	Length
1.	"William, It Was Really Nothing"	2:10
2.	"How Soon Is Now?"	6:43

- in lilac reprint sleeve

12" RTT166/CD RTT166CD
No.	Title	Length
1.	"William, It Was Really Nothing"	2:10
2.	"How Soon Is Now?"	6:43
3.	"Please, Please, Please Let Me Get What I Want"	1:50

== Artwork and matrix message ==
British 7" and 12" with green tinted cover versions feature the matrix message: THE IMPOTENCE OF ERNEST/ROMANTIC AND SQUARE IS HIP AND AWARE

British 7' with lilac tinted cover: THE IMPOTENCE OF ERNEST/WE HATES BAD GRAMMER

British 12" with lilac tinted cover: THE IMPOTENCE OF ERNEST/ROMANTIC AND [ ] IS HIP N'AWARE

As well as being a reference to The Importance of Being Earnest, "The impotence of Ernest" is an allusion to the impotence that Ernest Hemingway suffered in his final years. The "romantic" line was said by John Lennon to Hunter Davies.

== Charts ==
Chart	Peak position
Ireland (IRMA)	8
UK Singles (The Official Charts Company)	17
UK Indie	1
