= The Dream Academy (album) =

Studio album by The Dream Academy
- Released: 16 September 1985
- Recorded: 1984
- Genres: Rock; dream pop
- Length: 42:06
- Labels: Blanco y Negro; Warner Bros.
- Producers: David Gilmour; Nick Laird-Clowes; George Nicholson; Gary Langan; Alan Tarney

The Dream Academy chronology
| The Dream Academy (1985) | Remembrance Days (1987) |

Singles from The Dream Academy
- 1. "Life in a Northern Town" Released: 12 March 1985; 2. "This World" Released: 14 October 1985 (promo only); 3. "Please Please Please Let Me Get What I Want" / "In Places on the Run" Released: 26 November 1985; 4. "The Love Parade" Released: 22 April 1986

The Dream Academy is the debut studio album by English band The Dream Academy, released on 16 September 1985 by Blanco y Negro Records in the United Kingdom and Warner Bros. Records in the United States. It was largely co-produced by Pink Floyd guitarist David Gilmour and Dream Academy frontman Nick Laird-Clowes. "Life in a Northern Town", written as a tribute to the musician Nick Drake, became the Dream Academy's only major chart success, reaching number 7 on the US Billboard Hot 100, number 4 on the Australian Charts and number 15 on the UK Singles Chart. The Dream Academy went on to chart at number 20 on the US Billboard 200, and number 58 on the UK Albums Chart.

The follow-up single from the album, "The Love Parade", was not received as well as their debut single, reaching number 36 on the Billboard Hot 100 and number 68 on the UK Singles Chart, but still received solid radio airplay. Also of note is the song "The Edge of Forever", which plays during a prominent scene in the John Hughes film Ferris Bueller's Day Off, resulting in many fans of 1980s films becoming more familiar with the Dream Academy's music.

== Critical reception ==
Professional ratings
Review scores
| Source | Rating |
|---|---|
| AllMusic | 4.5/5 stars |
| Record Mirror | 5/5 |
| Smash Hits | 6/10 |
| Sputnikmusic | 3.4/5 |

In a rave review of The Dream Academy for Record Mirror, critic Mike Mitchell likened the album to "a dream ... of the ordinary becoming glamorous, of maturing with age, of pleasant change, of counter revolution." Retrospectively, AllMusic reviewer Tom Demalon wrote that "The Dream Academy used lush string arrangements and choir-like background vocals to create a sumptuous backdrop for their paisley-tinged pop", most effectively on "Life in a Northern Town", "a slice of watercolored nostalgia with its memorable chant-like hook."

== Track listing ==
| No. | Title | Writer(s) | Producer(s) | Length |
|---|---|---|---|---|
| 1. | "Life in a Northern Town" | Nick Laird-Clowes; Gilbert Gabriel | David Gilmour; Laird-Clowes; George Nicholson | 4:16 |
| 2. | "The Edge of Forever" | Laird-Clowes; Gabriel | Gilmour; Laird-Clowes; Gary Langan | 4:20 |
| 3. | "(Johnny) New Light" | Laird-Clowes; Gabriel | Gilmour; Laird-Clowes; Nicholson | 4:19 |
| 4. | "In Places on the Run" | Laird-Clowes; Gabriel | Gilmour; Laird-Clowes; Nicholson | 4:28 |
| 5. | "This World" | Laird-Clowes; Gabriel | Gilmour; Laird-Clowes; Nicholson | 5:05 |
| 6. | "Bound to Be" | Laird-Clowes; Gabriel | Gilmour; Laird-Clowes; Langan | 3:07 |
| 7. | "Moving On" | Laird-Clowes; Gabriel | Gilmour; Laird-Clowes; Nicholson | 5:11 |
| 8. | "The Love Parade" | Laird-Clowes; Gabriel | Alan Tarney | 3:44 |
| 9. | "The Party" | Laird-Clowes | Gilmour; Laird-Clowes | 5:06 |
| 10. | "One Dream" | Laird-Clowes | Gilmour; Laird-Clowes | 2:30 |
| Total length: | | | | 42:06 |

== Personnel ==
Credits are adapted from the album's liner notes.

The Dream Academy

- Gilbert Gabriel – keyboards, vocals
- Nick Laird-Clowes – lead vocals, guitars, harmonica
- Kate St John – oboe, cor anglais, piano accordion, tenor saxophone, vocals

Additional musicians

- Gregg Dechert – Hammond organ (9)
- David Gilmour – guitar (6), acoustic guitar (9)
- Peter Buck – Rickenbacker 12-string electric guitar (9)
- Guy Pratt – bass (4, 7)
- Pino Palladino – bass (5, 6)
- Mickey Feat – bass (9)
- Chucho Merchán – double bass (10)
- Dave Mattacks – drums (5)
- Jake Le Mesurier – drums (7)
- Tony Beard – drums (9)
- Ben Hoffnung – timpani and percussion (1, 2, 5), vibraphone and assorted percussion (4)
- Luís Jardim – additional percussion (1), percussion (3)
- Bosco de Oliveira – percussion (7)
- Lucia Skidmore – cello (1)
- Jo Walton – cello (1)
- Adam Peters – cello (2, 6)
- Gary Barnacle – tenor saxophone (2)
- Dave DeFries – trumpet (10)
- Derek Adams – additional backing vocals (1, 3)
- June Lawrence – additional backing vocals (1, 3, 7)
- Sandrae Lawrence – additional backing vocals (3)
- Colette Walker – additional backing vocals (3)
- Caron Wheeler – additional backing vocals (6)
- Sam Brown – additional backing vocals (6)
- Ingrid Schroeder – additional backing vocals (7)

Production

- David Gilmour – producer (1–7, 9, 10)
- Nick Laird-Clowes – producer (1–7, 9, 10)
- George Nicholson – producer (1, 3–5, 7)
- Gary Langan – producer and engineer (2, 6)
- Alan Tarney – producer (8)
- Andy Jackson – engineer (1–7)
- John Hudson – engineer and mixing (8)
- Stephen Short – engineer (9, 10)

Design

- Peter Saville Associates – design, art direction
- Richard Haughton – photography
- Tarquin Gotch – management

== Charts ==
| Chart (1985–1986) | Peak position |
|---|---|
| Canada Top Albums/CDs (RPM) | 17 |
| UK Albums (Official Charts) | 58 |
| US Billboard 200 | 20 |
