= Amelia Warner =

English musician and former actress

- Born: Amelia Catherine Bennett; 4 June 1982 (age 44); Birkenhead, Merseyside, England
- Other name: Slow Moving Millie
- Occupations: Musician; composer; actress
- Years active: 1999–present
- Spouse: Jamie Dornan (m. 2013)
- Children: 3
- Parent(s): Annette Ekblom (mother); Alun Lewis (father)
- Relatives: Hywel Bennett (paternal uncle); Jim Dornan (father-in-law)

Amelia Warner (born Amelia Catherine Bennett; 4 June 1982), also known by her stage name Slow Moving Millie, is an English musician, composer, and former actress.

== Early life ==
Warner was born Amelia Catherine Bennett in Birkenhead, Merseyside, the only child of actors Annette Ekblom and Alun Lewis. Her paternal uncle is actor Hywel Bennett.

== Career ==
Warner started her acting career as a member of the Royal Court's youth theatre group. She starred in a 2000 BBC adaptation of Lorna Doone and had supporting roles in films such as Æon Flux and Stoned.

In 2015 she self-released a classical instrumental EP, Arms. In 2016 Amelia began scoring films, starting with Mum's List, followed by Mary Shelley. In 2017, she released her second EP, Visitors, under her own name.

In 2018, Warner won the International Film Music Critics' Association award for Breakthrough Composer of the Year for her debut mainstream score on the film Mary Shelley.

On 28 September 2020 Fearne Cotton announced she was releasing "Happy Place", an album featuring music from an array of artists focusing on mental health and well-being. The first single, released on the same day as the announcement, was "Lockdown Kittens Dancing", features music taken from Warner's song "For Love", on her June 2020 "Haven" EP. In the same year, she was invited to the Academy of Motion Picture Arts and Sciences.

== Slow Moving Millie ==
Warner began her music career in July 2009, when she wrote and performed the song "Beasts" under the name Slow-Moving Millie for a Virgin Media television commercial. The track was then released on 17 August 2009. Her second single, "Rewind City", was also used for another advertisement, for Orange UK, and was directed by Ringan Ledwidge. In October 2011, Warner signed a record deal with Island Records. Her cover version of the Smiths' 1984 B-side "Please Please Please Let Me Get What I Want" was released on 11 November 2011 and was selected as the soundtrack to the John Lewis 2011 Christmas advertisement. Since releasing her album, Renditions, she also composed music for adverts and short films. Her first major score was for the British short Mam. Soon after, Warner released her Fyfe Dangerfield-produced EP, Arms, under Universal Music. Her second EP was titled Visitors. In 2016, she scored her first feature-length film, Mum's List, followed by her score to the film Mary Shelley.

== Personal life ==
Warner married Colin Farrell in a non-legal ceremony in 2001; they ended the relationship four months later. She married Jamie Dornan in 2013 at Orchardleigh Estate. They have three daughters.

== Discography ==
=== Composer credits ===
Film/Series	Year	Notes
Mam	2010	Short
Mum's List	2016	
Mary Shelley	2017	
Leading Lady Parts	2018	Short
Wild Mountain Thyme	2020	
Mr. Malcolm's List	2022	
Young Woman and the Sea	2024	
Kathleen Is Here	2024	
Unforgivable	2025	BBC Television Film
Unidentified	2025	

=== Albums ===
Title	Album details	Peak chart positions
Title	Album details	UK
Renditions (as Slow Moving Millie)	Eight covers and two original songs; Released: 12 December 2011; Label: Universal / Island	89
Visitors (as Amelia Warner)	Instrumental music; Released: 20 April 2018; Label: Globe: Soundtrack and Score / Universal	—

=== Extended plays ===
Title	Details
Arms (as Slow Moving Millie)	Classical music; Released: 10 July 2015; Label: SMM Music / Universal
Haven (as Amelia Warner)	Classical music; Released: 19 June 2020; Label: Decca Records / Universal

=== Singles ===
Year	Single	Peak chart positions	Album
Year	Single	UK	Album
2009	"Beasts"	—	Renditions
2011	"Please, Please, Please, Let Me Get What I Want"	31	Renditions
2020	"Lockdown Kittens Dancing" (with Fearne Cotton and GABA feat. Helen Mirren)	—	Happy Place

== Filmography ==
Year	Film	Role	Notes
1998	Kavanagh QC	Gaynor Deans	
1998	Casualty	Rachel Munro	TV series Episode: "Eye Spy"
1999	Aristocrats	Lady Cecelia	Mini-series
1999	Mansfield Park	Teenage Fanny Price	
2000	Don Quixote	Antonia	
2000	Quills	Simone Royer-Collard	
2000	Waking the Dead	Jodie Whitemore/Jodie Whitemoor	
2000	Take a Girl Like You	Sheila Torkingham	
2000	Lorna Doone	Lorna Doone	
2002	Nine Lives	Laura	
2003	Love's Brother	Rosetta	
2005	Æon Flux	Una Flux	
2005	Winter Passing	Shelly	
2005	Stoned	Janet	
2006	Alpha Male	Elyssa Ferris	
2007	Gone	Sophie	
2007	The Seeker: The Dark Is Rising	Maggie Barnes	
2008	The Echo	Alyssa	
2010	Olga?	Cecilia	Short film
2012	The Other Side	Rachel	Short film

== Awards and nominations ==
Year	Award	Category	Nominated work	Result	Ref
2018	World Soundtrack Awards	Discovery of the Year	Mary Shelley	Nominated	
2018	IFMCA	Breakthrough Composer of the Year	Mary Shelley	Won	
2021	World Soundtrack Awards	Public Choice Award	Wild Mountain Thyme	Nominated	
2021	Hollywood Music in Media Awards	Best Original Score - Independent Film	Wild Mountain Thyme	Nominated	
2021	Hollywood Music in Media Awards	Best Original Song - Independent Film	Wild Mountain Thyme	Nominated	
2021	IFMCA	Best Original Score for a Comedy Film	Wild Mountain Thyme	Nominated	
2021	ASCAP	Film Score of the Year	Wild Mountain Thyme	Nominated	
2023	World Soundtrack Awards	Public Choice Award	Mr Malcolm's List	Won	
2024	World Soundtrack Awards	Public Choice Award	Young Woman and the Sea	Nominated	
2025	IFMCA	Best Original Score for a Drama	Young Woman and the Sea	Nominated	
2025	ASCAP	Film Score of the Year	Young Woman and the Sea	Nominated	
