= Planes, Trains and Automobiles =

1987 film by John Hughes

- Theatrical release poster
- Directed by: John Hughes
- Written by: John Hughes
- Produced by: John Hughes
- Starring: Steve Martin; John Candy
- Cinematography: Donald Peterman
- Edited by: Paul Hirsch
- Music by: Ira Newborn
- Production companies: Paramount Pictures; Hughes Entertainment
- Distributed by: Paramount Pictures
- Release date: November 25, 1987
- Running time: 92 minutes
- Country: United States
- Language: English
- Budget: $15 million
- Box office: $49.5 million

Planes, Trains and Automobiles is a 1987 American road trip comedy film written, produced, and directed by John Hughes. The film stars Steve Martin as Neal Page, an uptight advertising executive, and John Candy as Del Griffith, an overly-friendly traveling salesman, who become unlikely companions after a snowstorm disrupts their travel plans. Stranded far from home, the pair embarks on a series of misadventures while attempting to get Neal home to his family in Chicago in time for Thanksgiving.

Produced by Paramount Pictures and Hughes Entertainment, the film was shot primarily in New York state during 1987. Rewrites by Hughes and improvisation between Martin and Candy resulted in an initial cut that ran nearly four hours before being substantially shortened for theatrical release. The film's score was composed by Ira Newborn.

Released on November 25, 1987, Planes, Trains and Automobiles was both a critical and commercial success. It grossed $49.5 million against a $15 million budget and received praise for its blend of comedy and sentiment, as well as the performances of Martin and Candy. Critics also noted the film as a departure from Hughes's then-established reputation for teen-oriented comedies.

In the years following its release, the film developed a cult following and became closely associated with the Thanksgiving holiday in the United States.

In an interview, Hughes described a disastrous trip from Chicago to New York City he experienced while an advertising executive, which apparently inspired the movie.

== Plot ==
In New York City, two days before Thanksgiving, advertising executive Neal Page is eager to return to his family in Chicago. After a prolonged business meeting with an indecisive client and with a snowstorm threatening, Neal struggles to secure a taxi during rush hour. Although he bribes a man to give up a cab he has hailed, another man swoops in and takes it instead.

Neal arrives at LaGuardia Airport to discover that his flight is delayed. While waiting, he encounters Del Griffith, a chatty and affable traveling shower-curtain-ring salesman who unknowingly took his cab. Del's overly friendly demeanor immediately clashes with Neal's uptight and repressed personality. Adding to his frustration, Neal's first-class seat is reassigned to a cramped coach seat—right next to Del—on the flight to O'Hare International Airport.

A blizzard in Chicago forces the plane to divert to Wichita, Kansas, leaving Neal and Del stranded overnight. At hotel check-in, they inadvertently swap credit cards. With only one room available, the two are forced to share a double bed. Frustrated by Del's irritating behavior, Neal loses his temper and harshly criticizes him. Hurt, Del admits his shortcomings but asserts that he likes himself as he is, as does his wife. His response humbles Neal. While they sleep, a thief breaks into their room and steals their cash.

The next day, with air travel severely delayed, Neal purchases train tickets to Chicago for himself and Del, opting for separate compartments. He bids Del farewell, but their journey is interrupted when the locomotive breaks down near Jefferson City, Missouri, leaving passengers stranded in a field. Spotting Del struggling with his trunk, Neal decides to help, and the two reunite before traveling by bus to St. Louis. During a meal, Neal upsets Del by suggesting they continue their journey separately, leading to another parting of ways.

At Lambert Airport in St. Louis, Neal attempts to rent a car but finds it missing when he reaches the lot. Infuriated, he delivers an expletive-filled tirade to a car rental employee and then attempts to book a taxi to Chicago. He insults the dispatcher, who responds by punching him in the face. By chance, Del arrives in a rental car and offers Neal a ride. That night, Del nearly kills them when he inadvertently drives the wrong way on a freeway. After narrowly avoiding disaster and pulling over, Del's carelessly discarded cigarette ignites the car, setting it ablaze. Neal initially laughs, believing that Del is liable for the damage. However, Del confesses that he found Neal's credit card in his wallet, used it to rent the car, and then returned it to Neal's wallet, which is in the vehicle.

With his credit cards destroyed, Neal barters his expensive watch for a motel room but refuses to help Del. Unable to afford a room, Del attempts to sleep outside in the frigid temperatures and snow. Reflecting aloud, Del laments meeting someone whose company he genuinely enjoys, only to drive them away with his overbearing behavior. Neal feels pity for Del and invites him to share the room. The two bond over drinks, reminiscing about their chaotic journey.

On Thanksgiving Day, the pair continues their journey in the burnt car until a state trooper impounds it for being unroadworthy. Del persuades a truck driver to give them a ride to Chicago—albeit in the truck's refrigerated trailer. At a Chicago "L" station, Neal thanks Del for helping him get home, and the two part amicably. However, as Neal rides the train, he reflects on Del's peculiar comments and silences during their journey. Troubled, Neal returns to the station and finds Del sitting alone. Del confesses that he has no permanent home and has been living on the road since his wife's death eight years earlier. Neal brings Del home with him and introduces his family to his new friend.

== Cast ==
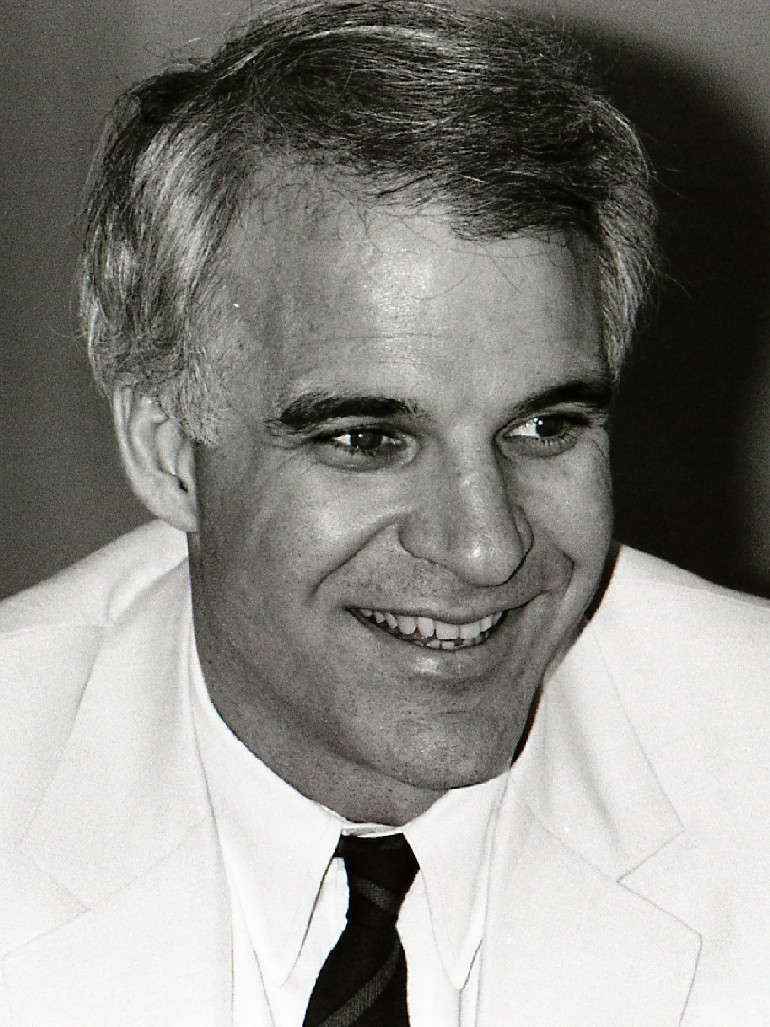
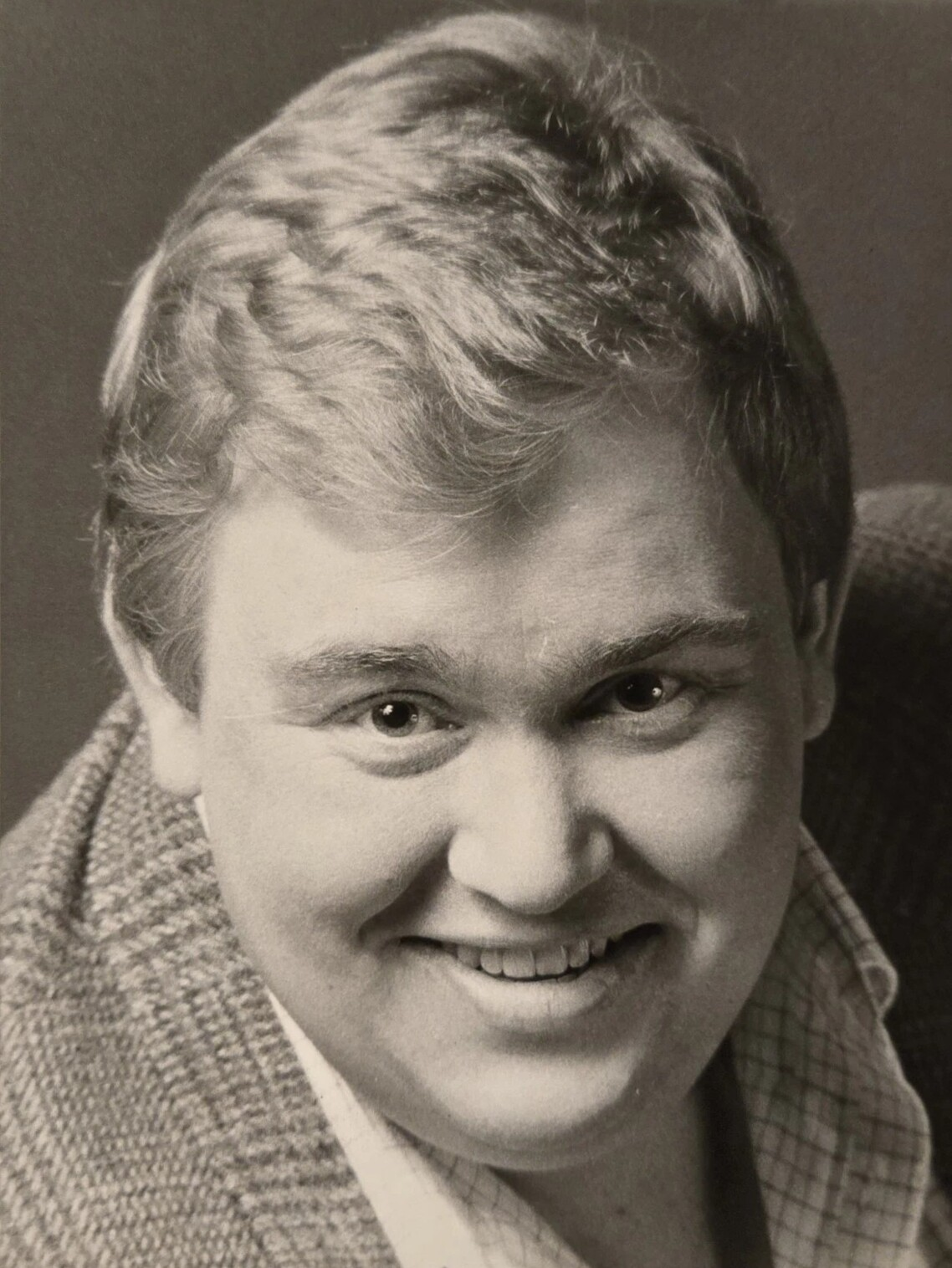
Steve Martin and John Candy (both pictured in 1982)
- Steve Martin as Neal Page, an advertising executive
- John Candy as Del Griffith, a shower curtain ring salesman
- Laila Robins as Susan Page, Neal's wife
- Michael McKean as a state trooper who impounds a fire-damaged car that Neal and Del are driving
- Dylan Baker as Owen Mooney, a redneck who lets Del and Neal ride in the bed of his pickup truck
- Carol Bruce as Joy, Neal's mother
- Olivia Burnette as Marti Page, Neal and Susan's daughter
- Diana Dill as Peg, Susan's mother
- Martin Ferrero as the second motel clerk
- Larry Hankin as Doobby
- Richard Herd as Walt, Susan's father
- Susan Kellermann as Waitress
- Matthew Lawrence as Neal Page, Jr., Neal and Susan's son
- Edie McClurg as Marathon car rental agent
- George O. Petrie as Martin, Neal's father
- Gary Riley as a thief who robs Neal and Del while they are sleeping
- Charles Tyner as Gus Mooney, Owen's father and a motel owner

Planes, Trains, and Automobiles also features Kevin Bacon as the man racing Neal to a taxi, Susan Isaacs as Marie, Del's wife, Lulie Newcomb as Owen's wife, John Randolph Jones as a cab dispatcher, Diana Castle as a stewardess, Bill Erwin as a man on a plane, Ruth de Sosa as a New York ticket agent, and Ben Stein as a Wichita airport representative.

There are uncredited appearances by Lyman Ward as John, William Windom as Mr. Bryant, an indecisive client, Chino 'Fats' Williams as Marathon shuttle driver, and Troy Evans as a social trucker.

== Production ==
=== Filming ===
The route taken by Del Griffith and Neal Page in the film (schematic)

The filming of Planes, Trains and Automobiles began in February 1987 and lasted 85 days. It was filmed mostly in Batavia, New York and South Dayton, New York. A scene that takes place in St. Louis was filmed at St. Louis Lambert International Airport. There was also a scene in Braidwood, Illinois, at the Sun Motel, as well as a scene in Woodstock, Illinois, where the city's old courthouse was shown. Rewrites John Hughes did as well as improvisation between Candy and Martin during filming resulted in the film's first cut being three hours and 45 minutes long, featuring a number of additional characters and subplots. One key subplot about Neal's wife not believing him and suspecting that he is with another woman was cut. This explains why she is so happy to see Del at the end of the film. The young man who robs Neal and Del at the Braidwood Inn was the pizza deliveryman who dropped the beer in the hallway, causing a can to burst when Neal attempts to open it. He came back and robbed them because Del didn't give him a good tip. Another deleted subplot showed the state trooper revealing that Del and Neal actually drove past Chicago and had been pulled over in Wisconsin. This explains why it took them two days to get to Chicago from St. Louis and why the state trooper has a Wisconsin patch on his uniform.

=== Soundtrack ===
The soundtrack to Planes, Trains and Automobiles features a mix of rock and roll, country, and pop. The frenetic musical score by Ira Newborn makes extensive use of the folk song "Red River Valley", including a cover of Johnny and the Hurricanes' rock and roll version, "Red River Rock", performed by the British group Silicon Teens. Among other tracks is a cover version of "Back in Baby's Arms". The song, popularized by Patsy Cline, is performed by Emmylou Harris. Another popular song used in the movie is "Mess Around" written by Ahmet Ertegun and performed by Ray Charles.

A cover version of "Six Days on the Road" was used in the film, performed by Steve Earle & The Dukes. The film also featured the contemporary pop song "Modigliani (Lost in Your Eyes)" by Book of Love, using both the original single and the Requiem Mass Remix. A special instrumental version of "Power to Believe" by The Dream Academy, which the band recorded at Hughes's request, is extensively used in the film as Del's unofficial theme.

A cover of Hall & Oates' "Everytime You Go Away" performed by Blue Room is played over the final scene and the credits; Hughes planned to use Paul Young's well-known hit version but was denied the rights by the record company even though Young approved of Hughes's planned use of the song and wanted to see it included. The soundtrack album was released in 1987 as a physical vinyl and compact disc, but has since gone out of print. It is available for download on iTunes. "Everytime You Go Away" and "Power to Believe" were not included on the album (the soundtrack instead featured the original version of "Power to Believe" with lyrics). The instrumental version of "Power to Believe" was not released until 2014, when The Dream Academy included it on its compilation album The Morning Lasted All Day: A Retrospective.

== Release ==
=== Box office ===
The movie opened in American theaters on November 25, 1987 (the day before Thanksgiving), and finished third for the weekend, grossing $7,009,482. After its first five days, the film grossed $10,131,242 and stayed in the top ten for seven weeks. The movie finished its 12-week American run on January 22, 1988, with $49,530,280. The production budget was $15 million. The film was released in the United Kingdom on February 12, 1988, and topped the country's box office that weekend.

=== Home media ===
In October 2022, Paramount announced a 4K Ultra HD Blu-ray release. The release includes 75 minutes of deleted and extended footage, much of which was thought to be lost but was rediscovered and cleaned up from the John Hughes archive. It was released in the U.S. on November 22, 2022.

== Reception ==
On Rotten Tomatoes, the film holds an approval rating of 92% based on 66 reviews, with an average score of 8.1/10. The site's critics consensus states: "Thanks to the impeccable chemistry between Steve Martin and John Candy, as well as a deft mix of humor and heart, Planes, Trains and Automobiles is a hilarious, heartfelt holiday classic." On Metacritic it has a score of 72 out of 100 based on 22 critics, indicating "generally favorable reviews". Audiences polled by CinemaScore gave the film an average grade "B+" on scale of A+ to F.

=== Critical response ===
Planes, Trains and Automobiles marked a widely noticed change in the repertoire of John Hughes, generally considered a teen angst filmmaker at the time. It was greeted with critical acclaim upon release, in particular receiving two thumbs up from Siskel & Ebert, with Gene Siskel declaring it Candy's best role to date. The film was featured in Roger Ebert's "Great Movies" collection, Ebert writing that it "is perfectly cast and soundly constructed, and all else flows naturally. Steve Martin and John Candy don't play characters; they embody themselves. That's why the comedy, which begins securely planted in the twin genres of the road movie and the buddy picture, is able to reveal so much heart and truth." Leonard Maltin called the movie a "bittersweet farce", arguing that while the film was "hurt by an awful music score", Hughes "refuses to make either one [Martin or Candy] a caricature—which keeps this amiable film teetering between slapstick shenanigans and compassionate comedy."

== Remake ==
In August 2020, a remake was reported to be in development, with Will Smith and Kevin Hart as the leads. In February 2023, Hart confirmed that the writing was underway. In an April 2025 interview with writer Aeysha Carr, she claimed to have written a script with Smith and Hart set to star, but that the project "fell apart" for numerous reasons.

In December 2022, it was reported that Drew Barrymore and Adam Sandler wanted to reboot the film with them starring in it.
