= Please Please Please Let Me Get What I Want =

1984 song by The Smiths

Single by the Smiths
- A-side: "William, It Was Really Nothing"
- Released: 20 August 1984
- Studio: Jam (London)
- Genre: Alternative rock
- Length: 1:50
- Label: Rough Trade
- Composer: Johnny Marr
- Lyricist: Morrissey
- Producer: John Porter

"Please Please Please Let Me Get What I Want" is a song by the English rock band the Smiths. It was released on the B-side of the single "William, It Was Really Nothing" in 1984 and later featured on the compilation albums Hatful of Hollow and Louder Than Bombs. The song was also included on the soundtrack album of the 1986 film Pretty in Pink and featured in the 1999 film Never Been Kissed. An instrumental version of a cover by the Dream Academy was featured in the 1986 film Ferris Bueller's Day Off.

== Background ==
Johnny Marr wrote the music to "Please Please Please Let Me Get What I Want" shortly after its eventual A-side, "William, It Was Really Nothing". Marr commented, "Because that was such a fast, short, upbeat song, I wanted the B-side to be different, so I wrote 'Please Please Please Let Me Get What I Want' on Saturday in a different time signature—in a waltz time as a contrast". Marr has also noted that the music was an attempt to "capture the ... spookiness and sense of yearning" in Del Shannon's "The Answer to Everything", a song his parents played for him as a child.

The band's label, Rough Trade, initially was concerned about the song's short length. Morrissey recalled, "When we first played it to Rough Trade, they kept asking, 'Where's the rest of the song?'" Morrissey, who characterized the song "a very brief punch in the face," argued, "Lengthening the song would, to my mind, have simply been explaining the blindingly obvious".

"Please Please Please Let Me Get What I Want" was released as a B-side to "William, It Was Really Nothing". Morrissey commented, "Hiding it away on a B-side was sinful" and remarked "I feel sad about it now". The song also appeared on the compilation Hatful of Hollow, an inclusion Morrissey considered "by way of semi-repentance".

== Certifications ==
Region	Certification	Certified units/sales
Italy (FIMI)	Gold	50,000^{‡}
United Kingdom (BPI)	Gold	400,000^{‡}
^{‡} Sales+streaming figures based on certification alone.

== The Dream Academy version ==
"Please Please Please Let Me Get What I Want"

Single by the Dream Academy
- Released: 1985 (UK)
- Recorded: 1984
- Genre: Soft-rock; alt-pop
- Length: 3:09
- Label: Blanco y Negro
- Composer: Johnny Marr
- Lyricist: Morrissey
- Producers: David Gilmour; Nick Laird-Clowes

The Dream Academy singles chronology
"The Love Parade" (1985)	"Please Please Please Let Me Get What I Want" (1985)	"Indian Summer" (1987)

The Dream Academy covered "Please Please Please Let Me Get What I Want" in 1985. This version of the song peaked at number 83 on the UK singles chart. An instrumental version of this cover was used in the 1986 movie Ferris Bueller's Day Off, during a scene in which the titular character and his friends visit the Art Institute of Chicago.

Though Morrissey originally indicated his dislike for this version, he later used it as intermission music during late period Smiths concerts. He commented after the band's breakup, "I mean, I liked the Dream Academy version of that old Smiths song. Everyone despised it and it got to number 81, which is nearly a hit".

=== Track listing ===
7-inch version

1. "Please Please Please Let Me Get What I Want"
2. "In Places on the Run"

12-inch version

1. "Please Please Please Let Me Get What I Want"
2. "The Party" (acoustic)
3. "Please Please Please Let Me Get What I Want" (instrumental)
4. "In Places on the Run" (edit)

=== Chart performance ===
Chart (1985)	Peak position
UK Singles (OCC)	83

== Slow Moving Millie version ==
"Please, Please, Please, Let Me Get What I Want"

Single by Slow Moving Millie

from the album Renditions
- Released: 11 November 2011
- Recorded: 2011
- Length: 3:09
- Label: Island
- Composer: Johnny Marr
- Lyricist: Morrissey

Slow Moving Millie singles chronology
"Beasts" (2009)	"Please, Please, Please, Let Me Get What I Want" (2011)

English actress and songwriter Slow Moving Millie released a cover version of the song, adding commas to its title. It was released on 11 November 2011 as a download from her debut studio album Renditions. Her version was selected as the soundtrack to a John Lewis advertisement.

=== Track listing ===
Digital download
No.	Title	Length
1.	"Please, Please, Please, Let Me Get What I Want"	2:51

=== Chart performance ===
Chart (2011)	Peak position
UK Singles (Official Charts)	31

=== Release history ===
Region	Date	Format	Label
United Kingdom	11 November 2011	Digital download	Island Records

== Deftones version ==
Deftones released a version of the song on their B-Sides & Rarities album in 2005. The track went Gold in the US.

=== Certifications ===
Region	Certification	Certified units/sales
United States (RIAA)	Gold	500,000^{‡}
^{‡} Sales+streaming figures based on certification alone.
