= Kate St John =

British musician (born 1957)

- Born: 2 October 1957 (age 68); London, England
- Occupation: Musician
- Instruments: Oboe; accordion; saxophone; piano; cor anglais; vocals
- Formerly of: The Dream Academy; Ravishing Beauties; Channel Light Vessel
- Website: katestjohn.co.uk

Kate St John (born 2 October 1957) is an English musician. She was a member of bands Ravishing Beauties, The Dream Academy, and Channel Light Vessel, and of Van Morrison's live band, in which she played oboe and saxophone.

== Career ==
Classically trained on oboe, St John was working as a television researcher before joining her first band, Ravishing Beauties, to which she was invited by her friend Virginia Astley. With Nicky Holland, the trio joined The Teardrop Explodes in Liverpool during the winter of 1981 for a series of dates at small clubs and a UK tour in early 1982.

During the 1980s and early 1990s, she was a member of The Dream Academy with Nick Laird-Clowes and Gilbert Gabriel. In 1985 they had a worldwide hit with "Life in a Northern Town" and produced three albums: The Dream Academy (1985), Remembrance Days (1987) and A Different Kind of Weather (1990).

In the 1990s, St John was a member of Van Morrison's live band playing oboe and saxophone. She played on five Van Morrison albums. Emma Freud credited seeing St John playing saxophone for Van Morrison in the 80s as inspiration to learn to play saxophone herself. In 1994, she co-wrote and sang on four tracks with Roger Eno on the album The Familiar on the All Saints Label. This led to the formation of Channel Light Vessel, a band with Kate, Roger Eno, Bill Nelson, Laraaji and Mayumi Tachibana.

St John has released two solo albums: Indescribable Night (1995) and Second Sight (1997). The latter features a collaboration with the Russian group Aquarium.

St John and her husband and writing partner, Neill MacColl, specialise in on set music production in films, having worked on Far From The Madding Crowd (2015), Tulip Fever (2017), My Cousin Rachel (2017), and The Little Stranger (2018).
