= Life in a Northern Town =

1985 single by the Dream Academy

Single by the Dream Academy

from the album The Dream Academy
- B-side: "Test Tape No. 3"; "Poised on the Edge of Forever"
- Released: 12 March 1985
- Recorded: 1984
- Genre: New wave; baroque pop; psychedelic pop
- Length: 4:19
- Label: Warner Bros. (US) Blanco y Negro (UK)
- Songwriters: Gilbert Gabriel; Nick Laird-Clowes
- Producers: David Gilmour; Nick Laird-Clowes; George Nicholson

The Dream Academy singles chronology
"Life in a Northern Town" (1985)	"The Edge of Forever" (1985)

Music video
- "Life in a Northern Town" on YouTube

"Life in a Northern Town" is the debut single by British band the Dream Academy, released in March 1985 as a promotional single from the band's self-titled debut studio album. Written by Nick Laird-Clowes and Gilbert Gabriel, the song was produced by Laird-Clowes and Pink Floyd guitarist David Gilmour.

"Life in a Northern Town" reached No. 7 on the US Billboard Hot 100 chart in February 1986 and reached No. 15 on the UK charts. It is the band's highest-charting single in the UK, the US, and Ireland.

== Writing ==
Laird-Clowes has stated that the song is about the collapse of the shipping industry in the United Kingdom. Gilbert Gabriel, a member of the Dream Academy and co-writer of "Life in a Northern Town", said that the inspiration for the tune came from his experience at Dartington College of Arts.

According to Nick Laird-Clowes, "We had the idea, even before we sat down, to write a folk song with an African-style chorus. We started it and when we got to the verse melody, there was something about it that reminded me of Nick Drake." The song includes elements of classical music, an "African-esque" chant of "hey ma ma ma ma" (which was later sampled by dance duo Dario G for their track "Sunchyme" and by the duo Tritonal), and hints of psychedelia. "Life in a Northern Town" is written in the key of E major with a main chord pattern of E-A_{maj7}-E.

"Life in a Northern Town" was dedicated to singer-songwriter Nick Drake, who died in 1974. Laird-Clowes said he wrote the song on the guitar that Drake is holding on the cover of his 1971 album Bryter Layter.

Laird-Clowes told Mojo that his mentor Paul Simon spurred him to come up with the title; "I played him the song and he asked, 'What are you going to call it – Ah Hey Ma Ma Ma?' I told him that we intended to name it 'Morning Lasted All Day.' 'That’s no good,' he said and so I came up with 'Life In a Northern Town,' which he thought was a great title."

== Release ==
"Life in a Northern Town" was released as a single in 1985. It was included as a track on the band's self-titled album. By December 1985, Radio & Records reported that 70% of contemporary hit radio stations were playing the song across the United States. The single peaked at number seven on the US charts and number 15 on the UK charts. In the United States, the single remained in the Billboard Top 100 for 21 weeks.

Two videos were released to promote the single. The earlier version features the group performing the song in various locations in Hebden Bridge, West Yorkshire. The second version, released in November 1985, features the group performing at a concert while clips play featuring footage of Newcastle upon Tyne, Manchester, and Aliquippa, Pennsylvania.

== Reception ==
Writing for Music Week Jerry Smith called "Life in a Northern Town" a "dreamy, atmospheric single" with an "innovative sound". He said that the song's "rigging acoustic guitars and effective vocals build with thundering drums and chanted vocals to give a memorable chorus".

Cashbox praised "Life in a Northern Town" as "a brilliant record" that was "filled with the magic and energy of great pop." They highlighted the "buoyant, joyous choruses" and said that the "production, writing and singing are superb." Billboard referred to it as an "introspective song" that "should appeal to paisley-inclined Americans". Stephen Holden of The New York Times described "Life in a Northern Town" as a "richly textured nostalgic ballad...that looks back warmly on 'winter 1963, when it felt like the world would freeze with John F. Kennedy and the Beatles'".

Classic FM described the song as "brimming with nostalgia, something that's mainly achieved, somewhat unexpectedly, with the wistful sound of an oboe".

== Track listing ==
7" single

1. "Life in a Northern Town" – 4:17
2. "Test Tape No. 3" – 5:01

12" single

1. "Life in a Northern Town" (Extended) – 5:19
2. "Test Tape No. 3" – 5:03
3. "Life in a Northern Town" (7" Mix) – 4:14
4. "Poised on the Edge of Forever" – 3:32

=== Personnel ===
Credits sourced from "One Two Testing" and Mix.

The Dream Academy

- Nick Laird-Clowes – lead and backing vocals, acoustic guitars
- Gilbert Gabriel – backing vocals, ARP Solina String Ensemble, Roland JX-3P synthesizer, E-mu Emulator II
- Kate St John – backing vocals, cor anglais, piano

Additional musicians

- Ben Hoffnung – timpani, percussion
- George Nicholson – Roland TR-808 programming
- David Gilmour – sound effects, tape effects

=== Chart history ===
==== Weekly charts ====
Chart (1985–1986)	Peak position
Australia (Kent Music Report)	4
Canada Top Singles (RPM)	7
European Hot 100 Singles (Music & Media)	58
European Airplay (Music & Media)	13
Ireland (IRMA)	9
UK Singles (Official Charts)	15
UK Airplay (Music & Media)	2
US Billboard Hot 100	7
US Top Rock Tracks (Billboard)	7
US Hot Adult Contemporary (Billboard)	2

==== Year-end charts ====
Year-end chart (1985)	Position
Australia (Kent Music Report)	38
Year-end chart (1986)	Position
US Top Pop Singles (Billboard)	78

== Sugarland version ==
"Life in a Northern Town"

Song by Sugarland featuring Little Big Town and Jake Owen

from the album Love on the Inside
- Released: 22 July 2008
- Recorded: 2007
- Genre: Country
- Length: 4:14
- Label: Mercury Nashville
- Songwriters: Gilbert Gabriel; Nick Laird-Clowes
- Producers: Byron Gallimore; Sugarland

The song was covered in 2007 by the country music duo Sugarland, along with Little Big Town and Jake Owen, on the Sugarland Change for Change Tour. A live performance from 2007 was made into a music video by Becky Fluke for the network Country Music Television.

This performance was included on the Deluxe Fan Edition of Sugarland's 2008 album Love on the Inside and on Capitol Records' late 2008 re-release of Little Big Town's 2007 album A Place to Land. It was nominated for Vocal Event of the Year at the Country Music Association awards, Best Country Collaboration with Vocals at the 51st Grammy Awards, and Vocal Event of the Year at the 44th Annual Academy of Country Music awards.

=== Chart positions ===
Chart (2008)	Peak position
Canada Hot 100 (Billboard)	53
US Hot Country Songs (Billboard)	28
US Billboard Hot 100	43
