= The Dream Academy =

British band

- The Dream Academy in 1991; Left to right: Nick Laird-Clowes, Kate St John, and Gilbert Gabriel

Background information
- Origin: London, England
- Genres: Alternative pop; folk rock; new wave
- Years active: 1983–1991; 2014
- Labels: Blanco y Negro; Reprise; Warner Bros.
- Past members: Gilbert Gabriel; Nick Laird-Clowes; Kate St John

The Dream Academy were an English alternative pop band consisting of lead vocalist and guitarist and primary songwriter Nick Laird-Clowes, woodwinds player and pianist Kate St John, and keyboardist Gilbert Gabriel. The band are most noted for their 1985 hit record, "Life in a Northern Town".

== History ==
Laird-Clowes and Gabriel met each other in the late 1970s whilst the former was in a band called The Act. Their idea was to create a songscape different from the power pop groups popular at the time in the UK, by mixing instruments and sounds that had been rarely done prominently before, such as strings, woodwinds, percussion (timpani) and synthesizers. At first, Laird-Clowes and Gabriel called themselves the Politics of Paradise.

The Dream Academy formed in 1983. Laird-Clowes met Kate St John (then of The Ravishing Beauties) at a party and asked her to join his band. The trio settled on the name The Dream Academy and shopped their demos for nearly two years. Their work was rejected by every record label before they finally landed a recording contract with Warner Bros. Records in 1985. Along the way, they made connections with Adam Peters and Pink Floyd's David Gilmour, a friend of Laird-Clowes. Gilmour went on to produce, and/or play on, two of their albums and co-write one Dream Academy song, "Twelve-Eight Angel".

The band's first single, "Life in a Northern Town" (1985), was a worldwide success and sizeable hit in the U.S., charting at No. 7 on the Billboard Hot 100 chart, from an album co-produced by Gilmour. The song also made number 15 in the UK Singles Chart. The single was dedicated to the English singer-songwriter Nick Drake. It was their only major chart success. The band's follow-up single, "The Love Parade" (1985), charted in the U.K. and the United States.

Also in 1985, The Dream Academy covered the Smiths' "Please Please Please Let Me Get What I Want". Their version of the song peaked at number 83 on the UK Singles Chart. The Dream Academy's instrumental version of this cover was used in the movie Ferris Bueller's Day Off in 1986, as was "The Edge of Forever".

The band launched a worldwide promotional tour based on the chart success of "Life in a Northern Town" and appeared on the television programmes Saturday Night Live, The Tonight Show, American Bandstand (with Dick Clark), MTV (interview with J. J. Jackson), and Top of the Pops. The Dream Academy's eponymous debut album also reached a wide audience in the United States. Their two subsequent albums did not match their initial success. They also covered "Everybody's Got to Learn Sometime", released on the album Remembrance Days (1987).

The Dream Academy disbanded in 1991. In 2000, the band released a compilation album in Japan entitled Somewhere in the Sun... Best of the Dream Academy. In 2014, the band released another compilation album: The Morning Lasted All Day: A Retrospective. The Morning Lasted All Day was compiled, annotated, and remastered by Laird-Clowes.

== Band members ==
- Gilbert Gabriel – keyboards, synthesizers, vocals
- Nick Laird-Clowes – lead vocals, guitars, harmonica
- Kate St John – saxophone, oboe, cor anglais, accordion, piano, backing vocals

== Discography ==
=== Studio albums ===
Year	Album details	Peak chart positions	
Year	Album details	UK	US
1985	The Dream Academy: Release date: 16 September 1985; Label: Warner Bros. Records	58	20
1987	Remembrance Days: Release date: 26 October 1987; Label: Reprise Records	—	181
1990	A Different Kind of Weather: Release date: 15 June 1990; Label: Reprise Records	—	—
"—" denotes releases that did not chart

=== Compilation albums ===
Year	Album details
2000	Best of the Dream Academy: Release date: 28 March 2000; Label: WEA International
2014	The Morning Lasted All Day: A Retrospective: Release date: 29 July 2014; Label: Real Gone Music
2024	Religion, Revolution & Railways: The Complete Recordings: Release date: 23 February 2024; Label: Cherry Red Records

=== Singles ===
Year	Single	Peak chart positions										Album
Year	Single	UK	AUS	BEL	CAN	CAN AC	IRE	NLD (Note: While none of the group's songs charted on the official Album Top 100 or Single Top 100, "Life in a Northern Town" was a hit on the Dutch Charts' unranked Single Tip chart.)	US	US AC	US Main	Album
1985	"Life in a Northern Town"	15	4	—	14	7	9	—	7	2	7	The Dream Academy
1985	"The Edge of Forever"	—	—	—	—	—	—	—	—	—	37	The Dream Academy
1985	"This World"	—	—	—	—	—	—	—	—	—	—	The Dream Academy
1986	"The Love Parade"	68	76	30	41	—	—	—	36	13	—	The Dream Academy
1986	"Please Please Please Let Me Get What I Want"	83	—	—	—	—	—	—	—	—	—	Ferris Bueller's Day Off (soundtrack)
1986	"Indian Summer"	—	—	—	—	—	—	—	—	—	—	Remembrance Days
1987	"The Lesson of Love"	—	—	—	—	—	—	—	—	—	—	Remembrance Days
1987	"Power to Believe"	—	—	—	—	—	—	—	—	—	—	Remembrance Days
1987	"In the Heart"	—	—	—	—	—	—	—	—	—	—	Non-album single
1990	"Love"	—	—	—	—	—	—	—	—	—	—	A Different Kind of Weather
1991	"Angel of Mercy"	—	—	—	—	—	—	—	—	—	—	A Different Kind of Weather
2014	"Sunrising"	—	—	—	—	—	—	—	—	—	—	The Morning Lasted All Day
"—" denotes releases that did not chart

== See also ==
- List of folk rock artists
- List of performers on Top of the Pops
