= Nick Laird-Clowes =

British musician and composer; lead singer, songwriter for The Dream Academy

- Born: 5 February 1957 (age 69); London, England
- Instruments: Vocals, guitar
- Formerly of: The Dream Academy

Nick Laird-Clowes (born 5 February 1957, in London, England) is an English musician and composer, best known as the singer, guitarist, and primary songwriter for The Dream Academy.

== Life and career ==
Laird-Clowes was a member of Alfalpha and The Act before forming The Dream Academy. He was also a presenter for the first series of the Channel 4 music show The Tube.

The Dream Academy formed in 1983. Laird-Clowes sang and played guitar for the band and was its primary songwriter. The band's other members were multi-instrumentalist Kate St John and keyboardist Gilbert Gabriel. The Dream Academy is most noted for their 1985 hit single, "Life in a Northern Town" (1985), which was a worldwide success and a sizeable hit in the U.S. The band released three albums: The Dream Academy (1985), Remembrance Days (1987) and A Different Kind Of Weather (1990). The Dream Academy disbanded in 1991.

Laird-Clowes released a solo album, Mona Lisa Overdrive, under the name Trashmonk in 1999.

A friend of David Gilmour, with whom he co-produced both The Dream Academy and A Different Kind of Weather albums, Laird-Clowes contributed lyrics to two songs on Pink Floyd's album The Division Bell, Poles Apart and Take It Back.

In the 2000s, Laird-Clowes was involved in film and documentary soundtracks. He produced the score for The Invisible Circus (2001), directed by Adam Brooks and starring Cameron Diaz, and was the musical consultant for Bernardo Bertolucci's The Dreamers (2003). Laird-Clowes composed the music for Fierce People (2005), which was directed by Griffin Dunne and starred Diane Lane and Donald Sutherland, and for Wit Licht (2008), directed by Jean van de Velde. Nick Broomfield's film Battle for Haditha, which premiered at the London Film Festival in 2007, also had a Laird-Clowes soundtrack. In June 2009, he scored Broomfield's agitprop documentary for Greenpeace, A Time Comes, featuring the single "Mayday".

In May 2007, Laird-Clowes and Joe Boyd produced a Syd Barrett memorial concert, "The Madcap's Last Laugh", at the Barbican Centre in London; the concert also featured both Pink Floyd and Roger Waters.

In 2013, Laird-Clowes worked as both composer and music consultant for the Richard Curtis directed film, About Time. In 2014, The Dream Academy released a compilation album entitled The Morning Lasted All Day: A Retrospective; it was compiled, annotated, and remastered by Laird-Clowes.

In 2017, Laird-Clowes composed the music for the feature documentary, Whitney: Can I Be Me, directed by Nick Broomfield. In 2019 (and also for Broomfield), he composed the score for the acclaimed Universal film about Leonard Cohen, Marianne & Leonard: Words Of Love.

In 2026, he travelled to Darwen in Lancashire, following a request from singer Paul Stuart Davies, whose Begin2Sing project had covered Life in a Northern Town. The song was introduced by Laird-Clowes and performed to thousands by community singers at the Christmas Light Switch On.
