= Julia Tobin =

British actress

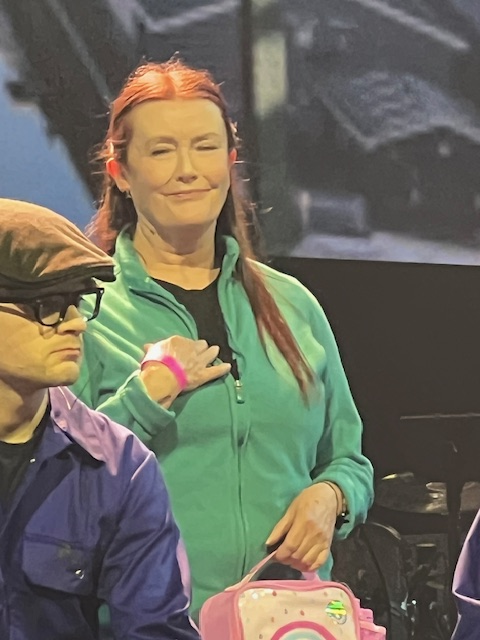
- Tobin on stage at Sunday for Sammy, 2026
- Born: 1955 (age 70–71); Wallsend, Newcastle Upon Tyne, England
- Presenting career
- Show: Auf Wiedersehen Pet, The Bill, Spender,Sunday for Sammy
- Style: British actress

Julia Tobin (born in 1955, Tyne and Wear) is an English actress, best known for playing Brenda Hope in the comedy drama series Auf Wiedersehen, Pet and Joan of Arc in the music video by Orchestral Manoeuvres in the Dark. She is the only actress to appear in every series of Auf Wiedersehen, Pet.

== Personal life ==
Tobin is the daughter of Stella (née Wright) and James Tobin. She lives in Newcastle upon Tyne.

Other notable TV appearances include an episode of Spender, The Bill and the Auf Wiedersehen, Pet episode of the documentary series Drama Connections.

== Later work ==
Tobin reprised her role as Brenda Hope alongside her Auf Wiedersehen, Pet cast mates for the show's 40th anniversary at the City Hall in Newcastle in 2024. Tobin is a regular performer as part of the North East charity concert Sunday for Sammy, at City Hall Newcastle and in 2026 at Utilita Arena Newcastle.
