= Brendan Healy (comedian) =

British entertainer (1956–2016)

- Born: 18 December 1956
- Died: 18 February 2016 (aged 59)
- Occupation: Entertainer
- Website: brendanhealy.co.uk

Brendan Healy (18 December 1956 – 18 February 2016) was a British entertainer from North East England. Beginning as a musician (on keyboards and occasional trombone), he worked in television, becoming an actor, theatre writer and producer, and, later, a comedian.

== Early life and career ==
Healy attended St Cuthbert's Grammar School in Newcastle upon Tyne and then enrolled on a music course at the College of Arts and Technology. He worked as a musician while studying and was then a member of a touring theatre group and the Second City Theatre Company. He played keyboards on the children's television series Razzamatazz, and toured as a musician with several acts, including John Miles and Goldie and folk rock group Lindisfarne in the 1990s. He also wrote television signature music for Tyne Tees Television.

He was musical director with Ken Hill at the Newcastle Playhouse, establishing the first Narnia books performed on stage.

== Television actor ==
As an actor, Healy appeared in several television programmes, including the Catherine Cookson adaptation, The Black Velvet Gown, Badger, Boon, Spender, and Quayside. As a supporter of Sunderland his ‘character Andy’ antagonised Newcastle United-supporter Oz in an episode of Auf Wiedersehen, Pet.

== Stand up comedy ==
Healy also embarked upon a career as a stand-up comic. He released a solo-DVD, Tall Stories, in 2005, recorded at The Customs House, South Shields. As part of his Little Theatre Tour, he played several venues in the North East in 2012.

== Writer and producer ==
He produced the annual pantomime at the Tyne Theatre in Newcastle, usually also writing and performing in the show. He has written a musical with Brian Johnson, from rock band AC/DC, with a script by Dick Clement and Ian La Frenais, called Face of a Woman, based on Helen of Troy.

Healy performed at all of the Sunday for Sammy concerts, established to support new talent in North East England.

Healy died on the evening of 18 February 2016, following a long period with cancer.

== Personal life ==
Brendan is a father of four with Jeanette his first wife; Jack, Charlotte, Fin, Sam. He was married until his death to Stephanie Constable.
