= Val McLane =

British actress

- Born: Valerie Bradford; 25 February 1943 (age 83); Newcastle upon Tyne, England
- Occupations: Actress, scriptwriter, director and teacher
- Television: Norma in Auf Wiedersehen, Pet

Val McLane (born Valerie Bradford 25 February 1943, in Newcastle upon Tyne, Northumberland) is an English actress, scriptwriter, director and teacher.

== Early life ==
She grew up in Walker and Benton. Her younger brother is actor and musician Jimmy Nail. She attended the convent direct grant grammar Sacred Heart Catholic High School, Newcastle upon Tyne in Fenham. She has an English degree and a post-graduate teaching diploma from the University of Leeds.

== Career ==
She taught for six years from 1965 to 1971 at St. Joseph's RC Grammar Technical School. Six years later she completed a part-time Drama in Education course at Durham University.

McLane founded the Live Theatre Company in Newcastle in 1973 with director Geoff Gillham. She has appeared in numerous television roles, including Brookside in 1983 as Maureen Lomax, a friend of regular character, Sheila Grant; When the Boat Comes In, Behind the Bike Sheds, and some Catherine Cookson adaptations for Tyne Tees Television. She appeared as Norma, Dennis' (Tim Healy) sister in the second series of Auf Wiedersehen, Pet. Other television roles include a role as a secretary in Our Friends in the North.

Stage roles include Florrie in Andy Capp: The Musical at the Aldwych Theatre. She usually appears in the biannual benefit concert Sunday for Sammy. She appeared in the films Wish You Were Here and Purely Belter. She also appeared in Jane Eyre 1997 and Grace Poole.

She has edited The Prison Plays by Tom Hadaway and released Women in My Past: A Dramatic Monologue, an audio book of dramatic monologue in prose, poetry and song. She was drama leader at the University of Sunderland until retiring in 2008. She now teaches the BA Honours Bridging Course at Reid Kerr College on behalf of University of Sunderland.
