= List of Auf Wiedersehen, Pet episodes =

This is a list of episodes of the British television programme Auf Wiedersehen, Pet.

== Series overview ==
| Series | Episodes | Originally released | |
| Series | Episodes | First released | Last released |
|---|---|---|---|
| 1 | 13 | 11 November 1983 | 10 February 1984 |
| 2 | 13 | 21 February 1986 | 16 May 1986 |
| 3 | 6 | 28 April 2002 | 2 June 2002 |
| 4 | 6 | 4 January 2004 | 8 February 2004 |
| Christmas specials | | 28 December 2004 | 29 December 2004 |

== Episodes ==
=== Series 1 (1983–84) ===
| No. | Title | Directed by | Written by | Original release date |
|---|---|---|---|---|
| 1 | "If I Were a Carpenter" | Roger Bamford | Dick Clement and Ian La Frenais | 11 November 1983 |
Geordies Dennis, Neville and Oz leave Britain to find work as bricklayers in Germany. While meeting the agent for the jobs they meet Barry Taylor, an electrician from Birmingham. As they are leaving they meet Wayne Norris a carpenter from London who asks for a lift but they say no. Later on in the journey, Oz's car breaks down on the autobahn, where he reveals that he had driven all the way to Germany with no insurance. Wayne passes them in a lorry and mimics the way they turned him down for a lift, whilst Dennis scolds Oz over his irresponsible behaviour. Arriving late to the site Dennis, Neville and Oz discover there are no more places at the hostel so they have to stay on the site in the hut. On the way to the hut they meet Bomber, a gentle giant of a brickie from Bristol. Barry arrives on his Triumph motorbike. On their first weekend, the lads go out on the town to a brothel, where Bomber returns the following morning, admitting that he lost all his money gambling and now has to abandon his plan to quit and take up a job back home in Bristol. Meanwhile Neville, posing as a carpenter due to a lack of bricklaying vacancies, has an accident with a saw and decides to return home as he is homesick. Dennis persuades him to come out with the lads at the end of the week. He returns to the hut in the following morning badly hungover and proclaims to the lads that he can never return home. When they ask why, he lifts his sleeve to reveal a lover's tattoo bearing the name "Lottie".
| 2 | "Who Won the War Anyway?" | Roger Bamford | Dick Clement and Ian La Frenais | 18 November 1983 |
Neville pesters Dennis to help him out in regards to him pretending to be a carpenter. Meanwhile Dennis receives a letter from his wife's solicitor about their divorce. After speaking with Herr Ulrich (Peter Birch), Neville gets laid off. While playing football on his own, Neville discovers an unexploded bomb and becomes a hero on the site. Neville befriends Helmut, a German carpenter working on the site, and meets his family at their home for dinner. Barry begins his quest for a leader in the hut. The final member of the magnificent seven arrives, Moxey a plasterer from Liverpool. When he arrives Bomber tells him to try the next hut, due to the atmosphere in the hut already. Once they see he has a dart board they invite him back, even though he has no darts. Oz has a fight in the local bar with some German scaffolders after continually bad mouthing Germany. He then gets fired and Neville takes his job. Dennis goes racing after Oz on Barry's motorbike after he gets his job back, thanks to the Germans he had a fight with. The lads decide to invite the German scaffolders to a darts match in their hut as an act of reconciliation and thanks, although Oz is still reluctant to renounce his animosity towards them.
| 3 | "The Girls They Left Behind" | Roger Bamford | Dick Clement and Ian La Frenais | 25 November 1983 |
Herr Pfister (the agent who hired the Brits) is late with the wages. We are introduced to the hardcase Magowan for the first time. Dennis and Oz take a trip to Liège to watch Sunderland A.F.C. even though they are Newcastle United F.C. fans. Oz's wife Marjorie meets Dennis's wife Vera as she has not heard from Oz in a month. Oz receives a letter from his wife, Marjorie. He sends it back marked 'not known at this address' to avoid sending her any money. After the match Oz goes out with the Sunderland fans but accidentally ends up on the charter flight back to Newcastle. He subsequently visits Marjorie, supposedly about the letter she sent him. When Neville and the lads find out Oz is in England they send his wages home, to the dismay and horror of Oz who returns the next morning.
| 4 | "Suspicion" | Roger Bamford | Ian La Frenais | 2 December 1983 |
All the lads are at a loose end due to Friday’s work rained off. Wayne, Oz, Neville and Bomber are playing pontoon. Wayne cleans up. Wayne goes off to meet a woman who he buys a necklace for but she spurns his advances. The rest of the lads return after a trip to the cinema. Neville finds that someone has stolen his money he had hidden in his shoe. Then Oz realises his watch has also been stolen. Moxey has been laid up in bed all day with the flu, the group start to question him. Wayne returns and they start to accuse him too after he mentions he spent some money on his date. There is an altercation between Wayne and Neville, Neville cuts his hand on one of the lockers. Neville goes to a doctor and meets Wayne’s date, unknown to him. Neville takes a shine to her and they meet up while he is laid off with his hand injury. She gives Neville the necklace that Wayne bought for her. Meanwhile Oz has a plan to catch the thief with some security liquid. Neville comes under the suspicion as Oz clocks him coming out of the pawn brokers. Neville confesses to meeting Ingrid the woman from the doctors, and how he pawned the necklace she gave him because of money problems of his wife back home. All the lads are at the bar except for Oz, he coats a 100 Deutsche Mark note with the security liquid. The lads come back from the boozer a little worse for wear and see the note, they all pass it around. In the morning they all have green fingers and the note is still on the table; the viewers then see who the thief was (one of the Turkish workers staying in an adjacent hut who brings in fuel for the stove), but the lads don't.
| 5 | "Home Thoughts from Abroad" | Baz Taylor | Stan Hey | 9 December 1983 |
Oz once again finds fault with the German work quality and Barry is roped in to explain the phrase 'jerry-built'. Bomber gets a phone call from his wife. It is Friday night and Oz, Dennis, Moxey and Barry go to an Indian restaurant. Neville and Bomber stay in the hut and Bomber shares with Neville that his teenage daughter Tracy has run away from home. Barry and Moxey decide to plant a herb garden and Neville is going out at night without the rest of the lads, much to the annoyance of Oz. Bomber flies home to try to find Tracy, meanwhile Tracy turns up at the building site in Germany. The lads smuggle her into the hut and phone Bomber to let him know. The lads go to the bar leaving her alone in the hut with Wayne, severely warning him not to touch her. She flirts with Wayne, who asks her why she behaves like this. She cries and admits that she does it for attention. Bomber returns and embraces her. The lads go back to the Indian restaurant with Bomber and Tracy, and discover that Neville has been moonlighting there.
| 6 | "The Accused" | Roger Bamford | Ian La Frenais | 16 December 1983 |
Dennis has to go back to England to sort out his divorce, Neville decides to tag along with him. Oz has a near miss with a German worker who falls off the scaffolding. Back in Newcastle Dennis goes to Vera's solicitor and Neville has to be evasive about the bandage on his arm which is covering up his "Lotte" tattoo. Dennis and Neville return and head straight to a new bar Wayne has found. Neville shares a cab with a German woman who imposes herself on him. He walks her back to her apartment then goes back to the site. The following morning all the British workers are rounded up for an ID parade, the girl Neville escorted home steps out of the police car, with her face all bruised and points out Neville. Neville is arrested. Dennis goes to the police station with Dagmar and they need 3000 Deutschmarks for bail. Bomber and Dennis are confronted by a group of German workers headed by Neville's friend Helmut. They agree to chip in for Neville's bail. Oz is asked to take a call from England in the site manager’s hut. It is Brenda, Neville's wife, she is worried as Neville did not call her as usual on Monday night. Oz tells her what has happened. She says she is coming over. Dennis meets the lawyer who says it won't go to court as the girl’s story "has many holes". A very emotional Neville returns to the site with Dennis and Helmut in a taxi, tearfully he says "I never thought I'd miss Oz" Back in the hut the lads mull things over and Neville remembers the girl had a boyfriend. And Barry recalls them having an argument in the bar. Helmut says he'll go look for them, Bomber and Barry go with him to identify them. Dennis tells Neville that Brenda is on the way. The next day Dennis asks Dagmar to meet Brenda at the airport, she drops Brenda off at the hotel. Dennis meets her there and fills her in on the story. They go and meet Neville at the police station, as they get there the police bring in the girl accusing Neville. Dennis buys Dagmar a box of Chocolates as a thank you, and she suggests he take her out for a meal.
| 7 | "Private Lives" | Roger Bamford | Ian La Frenais | 30 December 1983 |
It is the weekend again and Neville’s at a loose end. He asks Oz where Dennis is and Oz saw him leave early in the morning with some swimming gear. Neville coaxes Oz into going swimming and they see Dennis and Dagmar there. Dennis makes an excuse up that it is a coincidence. Wayne tries to teach Barry his technique with the ladies, Barry tries to chat up two women at a bar in the town with the line, "Would you like to come back to our hut?". On the way back, Barry and Wayne see some Swedish air hostesses in a taxi. They follow them to a hotel but get covered in mud due to Barry's shortcut. They rush back to the hut to get changed. Oz decides to stitch them up by playing a prank on them. He calls the Intercontinental Hotel and leaves the message for Wayne to come up to room 612. Wayne and Barry go up to the room but are followed by the manager of the hotel. They bump into Dennis who gives them refuge from the manager. They then start to surmise that Dennis is meeting a woman there and suggest it is Dagmar. This annoys Dennis and he kicks them out. They go to room 612 but instead of the Swedish air hostesses, it is occupied by a German couple who think that the two lads are muggers. Wayne and Barry make a sharp exit and are chased by the manager. They climb out of a window and jump off a roof. Dennis then has to spend an hour in the manager's office explaining who Barry and Wayne were, thus ruining his weekend with Dagmar. This episode features an extremely early appearance of Jenny Eclair (credited as Jenny-Clare Hargreaves), as a German room-service waitress.
| 8 | "The Fugitive" | Roger Bamford | Ian La Frenais | 6 January 1984 |
It is Saturday morning and Neville is annoyed that no one else is up, as they all agreed to go fishing over Friday night’s drinking session. Barry decides to grow a beard. After some nagging the rest of the lads agree to go. Except Oz and Wayne, Oz seems offended that the rest of the lads want some time away from him. Wayne goes off for the weekend with a woman from the local post office. While on the journey the lads come across a hitchhiker Colin, played by Ray Winstone. He says he is a student but is very vague about where he is going and such. They reach their destination and bid Colin farewell. Barry joins them after arriving on his motorbike. The barman spots someone trying to steal Barry's motorbike. Meanwhile back at the site the vandals are back. On the way home from the local bar, where Oz has spent the evening on his own, Oz chases the vandals. He doesn't catch them but he ends up getting his suit covered in paint. In the morning the lads are walking to the fishing spot when they bump into Colin who has been sleeping rough. Dennis gives him his room key and tells him to get a bath and a hot meal. When the lads take a break from fishing the lads get to talking about Colin. Barry says Dennis's trust maybe misplaced, and they think that Colin might be stealing from them, they rush back to the hotel but all is well. Oz confides in Wayne that he is thinking of going back home as he thinks the rest of the lads are always having a go at him. Back at the hotel the persuade Colin to come back to the site with them for a labourers job. Back on the site Colin runs off when he sees the police on the site investigating the vandals. Wayne goes through his things and finds his army ID. The lads conclude that he is a deserter. On the way back from the bar, Moxey and Barry see someone sneaking into the site. Barry goes off to get the rest of the lads. They all surround the supply hut but the person escapes out of another hut. The lads catch up with him and it turns out to be Colin. Meanwhile Barry is picked up by the police. Back in the hut Colin opens up about why he is AWOL. The lads persuade him to return. The following morning as they are saying goodbye to Colin, Barry turns up an explains that he was arrested by the police thinking he was a derelict due to the fact he hadn't shaved for 3 days.
| 9 | "The Alien" | Roger Bamford | Ian La Frenais | 13 January 1984 |
Sunday morning and Dennis, Neville and Barry are at the swimming baths and Neville thinks the lads in the hut should get a sports team together. Back at the hut, Wayne and Moxey are visited by Herr Grunwald who informs them that Magowan has been arrested. He demands they go and sort it out, with the threat of sacking them all if they don't. Dennis and Neville go and bail out Magowan (Michael Elphick). Neville gets a letter from Colin the army deserter form the previous episode, he is coming over with a few mates for a darts match. Oz bumps into Magowan in the local bar, he tells Oz he has been evicted from the Hostel. Oz brings him back to the hut, much to the dismay of the rest of the lads. The lads decide who will be in the darts team by having eliminators to find out the best four players. All the lads want Magowan out of the hut but dare not approach him due to his belligerent nature. The Lads get the booze ready for the Darts match against the army. Neville stands up to Magowan and demands he repay his share of the bail money and Magowan responds by assaulting him. Neville has gone and the lads think he has been going to an adult cinema. So all the lads go to the cinema, with all the commotion they spot an embarrassed Herr Grumwald in the cinema. Meanwhile Neville has been having guitar lessons next door to the cinema. Dennis has come up with an idea to get rid of Magowan. He blackmails Herr Grunwald into sacking Magowan. He leaves the site but steals the dartboard.
| 10 | "Last Rites" | Baz Taylor | Ian La Frenais | 20 January 1984 |
Barry and Moxey are trying to get a sun tan on their faces in the opening scene, to help with their complexions. Oz has business opportunity but is very secretive of what it is, giving the lads the hint "it's adult and liable to cause offence". While loading a supply of bricks and talking over the plan with Bomber, Oz accidentally injures Bomber. Dennis and Neville meet an old English ex-pat, Headley in the hospital and befriend him. Meanwhile, Oz persuades Barry and Moxey to join him in a dodgy pornographic video exporting racket. When Dennis and Neville's friend dies, Oz becomes very vocal that Headley should be buried back home in Britain. Oz uses the opportunity to try to smuggle the video tapes back to England in Headley's coffin. Wayne is going back to England for a family wedding and is asked by the lads to let Headley's sister know he is died. She tells him the story of how he was kicked out of the army for selling headlamps to the Russians, which is contrary to the story he told Dennis and Neville. She says he can be buried in Germany. Wayne phones the lads back in Germany and it all goes wrong when the body is cremated along with his videos.
| 11 | "The Lovers" | Baz Taylor | Bernie Cooper and Francis Megahy | 27 January 1984 |
Barry is getting frustrated about the state of the hut. Oz accompanies Wayne to an up market bar where Wayne has set up two women. They come up with the story that Oz is the heir to his fathers building empire. Oz falls hard for an attractive German woman named Uli, who tells him she is a beauty consultant. He begins to behave oddly, showing a sudden appreciation for German culture. Meanwhile Barry comes up with an idea to make the hut more homely. They all decide to steal some paint from the site to decorate the hut, but are unable to agree on a colour. Bomber goes off to a massage parlour and discovers that Uli works there. He confides in Dennis, who breaks the bad news to Oz. Oz confronts her at the massage parlour. The Turkish owner Kemal is also Uli's boyfriend, and after Oz leaves he beats her. Later on Kemal chases Oz around the site with a knife. The Turks on the site, whom Oz has always bad mouthed, save him by telling Kemal he is gay. Oz comes clean to Uli who is now sporting a black eye and a split lip. The rest of the lads go around and have a word with Kemal and threaten him if he ever beats her again.
| 12 | "Love and Other Four Letter Words" | Baz Taylor | Ian La Frenais | 3 February 1984 |
Oz and Barry have overslept. Barry can't find his sock and Oz has had an erotic dream about a woman called Yvette. There is a new girl working in the office with Dagmar, Wayne says she is his as he saw her first. Dennis strings the lads on by saying her name is Yvette, the girl in Oz's dream. Oz believes it is fate or kismet as Barry says. Dennis receives a letter from Vera saying she is coming over. Dennis and Bomber are coming back to the hut from the bar when they see a rat. All the rest of the lads have been eating Brenda's sisters chocolate cake. Dennis and Bomber turn it down and tell the lads about what they have just seen. Dennis meets Vera at the airport. That evening he introduces her to Dagmar. Later Vera tells Dennis she doesn't want a divorce anymore. Oz has bought "Yvette" some flowers, only to find out her name is Christa. Wayne buys the flowers off Oz and gives them to Christa who he has fallen for. She asks to see the hut where the live and is scared by the rat. Oz barges in hearing the girl scream thinking Wayne is attacking her. Neville and Barry have bought some rat traps and some poison that makes rats very thirsty. Oz reveals he has eaten the "fancies" that were left on the table and says he has a raging thirst. Not knowing that it was the rat poison.
| 13 | "When the Boat Goes Out" | Roger Bamford | Stan Hey | 10 February 1984 |
It is a decision time for the lads. A change in German law means they have to either register with the authorities and pay tax or go back to England. Oz doesn't want to go back to England but doesn't like the idea of staying in Germany on his own. So he goes around the lads trying to persuade some of them to stay. Neville and Bomber are certain they are returning home. Wayne is set on staying as he has fallen for Christa, for whom he makes a plaque out of a piece of skirting board, much to the amusement of Barry and Moxey. Dennis is torn between Dagmar and his wife Vera. He decides to go out to the town to get drunk away from everyone else. He bumps into Magowan then some Germans from the site start trouble with Dennis and a fight ensues. Oz has followed Dennis and jumps in when it kicks off. Oz is wounded by a glass and is in hospital after a blood transfusion. Oz can't believe he has got German blood in him so Dennis makes up the story that Neville gave him 4 pints of his blood. Dennis has a heart to heart with Dagmar and decides to go back to England. Barry has decided to go to Saudi Arabia and he brings his motorbike into the hut to service it. Wayne is not happy as he is the only one stopping on. The lads have a "topping off" ceremony on the last day then go over to the bar. Dennis spends the last night at Dagmar's house for drinks. The lads return from the bar and Barry and Wayne smell petrol in the hut from Barry's bike, Wayne drops his cigarette and this set the hut on fire. Neville is panicking as all the passports, money and belongings are still in the hut. Neville knocks on Dagmar's door and explains what has happened, he is invited in and all the lads follow. The series ends with Dennis, Neville and Oz on the ferry back to England ruminating on their next move.

=== Series 2 (1986) ===
| No. | Title | Directed by | Written by | Original release date |
|---|---|---|---|---|
| 14 | "The Return of the Seven: Part 1" | Roger Bamford | Dick Clement and Ian La Frenais | 21 February 1986 |
After a recap of the end of series one, we see Neville on a building site being called away as Brenda his wife is giving birth. Moxey is on the run from the law, Bomber is seen wrestling, Wayne is driving a red 1977 BMW 520, Dennis is drinking in a casino and Barry and Oz are in the Falklands. Two years later, Neville's looking for work on a building site, on the way home he meets Dennis at the traffic lights. Dennis is driving a Jaguar. Dennis drops his boss crook/gangster Ally Fraser off at the airport with his girlfriend Vicky for their villa in Marbella. Neville meets his wife Brenda who is now a nurse with their child Deborah and he his a little wary about her playing mixed doubles with the doctors. Barry now owns a house in Wolverhampton, and is struggling to get it ready in time for after his wedding to girlfriend Hazel. He has an apprentice called Trevor, who prefers to be called Trev. While reminiscing about the lads in Germany he has the idea to call them up to help with the house. Neville calls a hungover Dennis and they meet up in a bar and talk about Barry's request but Dennis doesn't fancy going down to Wolverhampton to fix up his house. Dennis changes his mind as Ally's away for 3 weeks in Spain so they decide to go down in Ally's Jag, once Neville's got the ok from Brenda. Moxey's in an open prison plastering with another inmate. Oz gets strip searched at customs. Wayne calls Barry from a café on the M1 and agrees to give two students a lift. Dennis and Neville meet Barry and Wayne in the pub. While talking about his intended, Hazel, he remembers she been waiting in the restaurant since 8 pm. He rushes off to meet her but ends up being breathalysed. The lads drive back to Barry's and Neville has an accident parking the Jag. Once in the house Bomber notices a window open and Barry thinks he has been burgled. It turns out it was Moxey. Note: The car belonging to Ally Fraser is actually a Daimler, not a Jaguar.
| 15 | "The Return of the Seven: Part 2" | Roger Bamford | Dick Clement and Ian La Frenais | 28 February 1986 |
Barry is fretting about being breathalysed, Wayne has found a Motel so he goes off there with the two student hitchhikers, Bomber and Dennis go with him. Norma, Dennis's sister, calls in the morning and tells Neville about Ally Fraser coming back early. So Dennis has to hurry back to Newcastle. The two girls Wayne was with have left him the bill at the motel reception. Barry goes off to find Hazel and gets mistaken for a computer salesman at a conference. Hazel has gone round to the house and tells the lads they've knocked down the wrong wall. Dennis is in trouble with Ally so he goes home, Norma tells him some right bruiser has been looking for him, it turns out it is Oz. Oz finds out Dennis is working for Ally Fraser and goes with Dennis to meet him in case of any trouble. After a row with Ally, Dennis reveals he was helping Barry fix up his house, this gives Ally an idea to fix up a house he is buying from fellow Ex-pat criminal Kenny Ames. Oz follows big Baz (one of Ally's heavies) into his office thinking Dennis is in trouble. He "chins" Big Baz but he was only going to get some food for Ally and Dennis. Back at the house Barry returns to the house and the lads tell him Hazel's been round and Wayne took her home. At Hazel's she has a heart to heart with Wayne, and Wayne reveals he has split from his wife in Germany, Christa, the typist from the site from series one. Dennis returns with Oz and he tells the lads about the conversions on the house Fraser is buying. Work starts Monday so the lads crack on with Barry's house and complete it in four days. The lads are about to leave and Barry reveals he'll be joining them sooner as Hazel has postponed the wedding.
| 16 | "A Law For The Rich" | Roger Bamford | Dick Clement and Ian La Frenais | 7 March 1986 |
The lads are on their way to Ally's house. They stop off at a service station where they discuss who each of them are in regards to The Magnificent Seven. Ally arrives at the house then meets Kenny Ames's solicitor at a local hotel called the Cross Keys. The lads turn up the house "Thornley Manor". Oz breaks in around the back with Moxey but they are spotted by a local who calls the police. The lads turn up at the local village pub, the Barley Mow, run by haughty landlord Arthur Pringle. On the way back Moxey sees a police car and runs off. When scouting for a bed and breakfast, Dennis picks the Barley Mow and the lads ask him to check the landlord as he didn't like the lads who were in the pub earlier. The following morning the lads make a start on the house and discover Moxey has slept there overnight. There are two plain-clothed policemen in the Barley Mow asking Dennis questions about the house, so he lets Ally know, who advises the lads to start smashing the place up to show that it is undervalued, as the Fraud Squad think a back hand deal has been done with Kenny Ames who is in exile in Spain. Mrs. Bellamy, the local who called the police on them earlier, makes the lads stop work as Thornley Manor is a listed building. Barry finally joins the lads and has Moxey's bed as he has run off again, so Barry avoids paying for his room.
| 17 | "Another Country" | Roger Bamford | Dick Clement and Ian La Frenais | 14 March 1986 |
Dennis makes a call to Ally to inform him about Thornley Manor being a listed building. Moxey winds up in a transport café hitchhiking and a truck driver offers him a lift. Ally is on the golf course in Spain with Kenny and is very annoyed as he thinks Kenny didn't inform him of this before the sale, Kenny persuades him to turn it into an old folk’s home, which would avoid the issues with the house being a listed building. The lads are playing football in the car park of the Barley Mow when an attractive woman, by the name of Carol, arrives. Wayne helps her with her bags and it turns out to be Arthur Pringle's daughter. Dennis's sister, Norma, arrives at the Cross Keys. While enjoying a meal together, the lads show up in the bar. Oz has a row with the upper-class drinkers. The next day Neville is asked by a local land owner to take a look at a barn he wants converting. Barry and Oz go for a drive, then Oz decides to poach some trout but they are almost caught by a gamekeeper but they manage to escape. In the local town Oz and Barry are in a local café and the gamekeeper has followed them. Oz hides the fish in a woman's coat and they are about to get away with it until in the car park the woman puts her hand in her pockets. The landowner that Neville is working for is called into the police station about the poachers. Neville has a word with him and he agrees to drop any charges. Bomber joins Dennis and Norma in the Cross Keys and reveals he has picked up Moxey. When the lads return they see Wayne sat outside with all their bags. When asked why he explains that Arthur caught him in bed with his daughter.
| 18 | "A Home from Home" | Roger Bamford | Stan Hey | 21 March 1986 |
After being kicked out of the Barley Mow the lads can't get any new accommodation as it seems Arthur Pringle has put the word about. Barry suggests they stay in the mansion. Moxey tells the lads he has changed his name to Brendon Mulcahy, or Brendan Mulachy as he claims because he can't pronounce Mulcahy properly. Ally is with Kenny in Spain and is annoyed about the delay with the building work. They agree on the idea of turning Thornley Manor into an old people's home. Oz, Neville, Moxey, Barry go to the supermarket to stock up on food, beer and toilet paper. The lads are at a loose end and Barry suggests brass rubbing but the lads try the Barley Mow. While brass rubbing Barry meets the local vicar who tells him about the ghost at Thornley Manor. Barry can't sleep due to the thought of the ghost, he goes to the toilet and sees what he thinks is a ghost. Ally speaks to the architect who gives him 3 different costings for the building work and Ally picks the cheapest one. The lads return from the pub to find Wayne has bought a TV and video player, after a mix up with the video he bought they try one of the tapes Oz and Bomber found while clearing up in the cellar. They find it is one of Kenny Ames's (the previous owner) sex parties. As they watch the tape of various men with scantily clad women the camera cuts to none other than Arthur Pringle. The lads return to the Barley Mow and let Wayne use this to blackmail Arthur into letting them drink in the pub again.
| 19 | "Cowboys" | Anthony Garner | Stan Hey | 28 March 1986 |
The architect meets Dennis and tells him Ally wants the cheaper option on the re-build. This doesn't go down very well with him as he sees this as a cowboy job. The following night the lads return from the pub only to find there are lights on in the house and the TV is on. Barry feels this proves that the house is haunted but Oz suspects that there is a more earthly explanation. Harry Blackburn, a plumber from Derby, joins the lads who is a big country and western fan and he invites the lads to his local pub that put on a country and western night. At the country and western bar Wayne pulls a woman and Oz gets up to sing and to the astonishment of the other lads he is very good. When the lads return they see lights on in the house again only this time Oz explains that before they left he coated the fridge door handle with super glue. When they go inside it's revealed that the strange goings on have not been the work of a ghost, but an elderly vagrant who has been squatting in the house the whole time the lads have been working on it. Ally comes up with a plan to buy ex-pats homes for quick cash due to a rumour that Spain will soon be expelling all British criminals. Neville goes home for the weekend and Dennis' sister Norma tells Neville about Dennis's debt with Ally Fraser. Upon returning to the Manor, Neville asks Dennis about this and he reveals he owes him £6,000. The lads air their grievance about the quality of the building materials, and after Neville informs the lads of Dennis's predicament, they decide to go on strike. Ally hears about this and sends down some "industrial relations consultants" but the lads fight them and win, Oz and Bomber proving particularly handy.
| 20 | "No Sex Please, We're Brickies" | Roger Bamford and Anthony Garner | Stan Hey | 4 April 1986 |
In this episode the lads go to the Barley Mow to celebrate their victory over Ally's thugs and Wayne lets slip that he didn't pay the import tax on his German registered BMW, unaware that Arthur is listening. Ally works out a compromise on the building costs and goes for the middle option and also agrees to wipe the slate clean on Dennis's debt if he can get the lads to work on his next project in Spain. He tells the lads about the Spanish job and they are all up for it. Wayne sees someone looking over his car and it is an officer from Customs and Excise who impounds the car, with a bill of £800. It is pay day and Wayne, Oz, Bomber and Moxey are going out on the pull. They get all dressed up then realise they don't have a car. So they end up going to the Barley Mow where Oz chats up a mature lady who asks him to do some work on her garage. Dennis and Neville have gone back to Newcastle for the weekend, Dennis tells his sister Norma about the debt with Ally. Oz goes to the mature lady's house to work on her garage but it turns out she doesen't even have a garage, instead she wants him for sex. Oz returns to the lads in the afternoon and regales them with the story. The job is finished and Ally turns up with bonus money and booze for the lads. Oz goes off with Wayne to get his car back and Oz realises the customs man's wife is the mature woman which he has just had sex. While he waits for a receipt Wayne finds out it was Arthur Pringle, the landlord of the Barley Mow who informed on him. So the lads leave him a going away present, they brick up his front door, ring him and sing "Wall meet again, don't know where, don't know when......" down the telephone to him as he opens the door.
| 21 | "Marjorie Doesn't Live Here Any More" | Roger Bamford | Dick Clement and Ian La Frenais | 11 April 1986 |
Dennis, Oz and Neville all return to Newcastle after the job and bring Bomber, Wayne, Moxey and Barry with them awaiting the Spanish job. Oz returns to his old address with Moxey and finds someone else living there. They turn up at Dennis's sister's doorstep and they kip in her living room. Oz meets his son at school and Rod tells him that they are moving to Italy with his mother's Italian boyfriend, Sandro. Oz meets his wife Marjorie and they row about moving to Italy. Wayne is stopping with Neville and Brenda. While Neville is out Wayne has a chat with Brenda and tells her about his wife Christa back in Germany, who is pregnant but doesn't want him back. Barry arrives on Tyneside and turns up at Oz's old flat to the annoyance of the occupant. Neville takes the phone off the hook so he and Brenda can have "an early night" while Wayne is out for the night. However Barry turns up after phoning Dennis as he can't get through to Neville. Barry keeps Brenda up that night chatting about his situation with his fiancée Hazel. Oz plans to snatch his kid, Rod from school, so he goes to watch him play football with Wayne. While there he meets Sandro. Surprisingly, the two men get on well, connecting over their shared interest in football. Wayne gets mixed up as there are two games of football and gets the wrong kid in the number 7 shirt. The lads ask Brenda to see if she can persuade Marjorie to let Oz see Rod. Marjorie gives in and Oz eventually meets Rod. Oz shows Rod the Newcastle shipyard where his late grandfather worked; Rod never met him. As Rod boards the bus, Oz tells him never to forget his roots.
| 22 | "Hasta la Vista" | Anthony Garner | Dick Clement and Ian La Frenais | 18 April 1986 |
The lads are waiting to fly so they a do a bit of clothes shopping. While in the departure lounge Dennis gets a call from Ally and things have been delayed. Ally invites the lads around to his house for some hospitality due to the delay in plans. The night before they go to one of Ally's clubs and Oz pulls a woman whose drunken boyfriend turns up and sees Moxey chatting to her. He gets the wrong end of the stick and starts a fight with Moxey and Oz saves the day. Moxey runs off again as there was an off-duty policeman in the club. Wayne and Barry are in a Chinese restaurant and Wayne tells him about splitting up with his wife Christa. The night they go to Ally's house and Neville is miffed as Dennis has brought his girlfriend and he told Neville no wives. Wayne flirts with Ally's girlfriend Vicky, and Ally sees it. Ally tells them the good news that they are going on Saturday but with one hitch, they must go as tourists due to them not having Spanish work visas. Because they are short handed due to Moxey doing another runner, Ally suggests a man he knows who owes him from his casino. While the lads are having a final drink the extra guy turns up, it turns out to be the angry boyfriend from the nightclub. The lads are on a downer because of the extra bloke, then Moxey returns and the lads raise their glasses to him. At the airport Wayne thinks he'll pull on the plane but it ends up that there are sharing the plane with the Spennymoor and District senior citizens society.
| 23 | "Scoop" | Roger Bamford | Dick Clement and Ian La Frenais | 25 April 1986 |
The lads touchdown in Spain and go looking for some action but because it is not holiday season, they find it almost deserted. So they end up back at the hotel with the old folks. The next day they go off to Ally's villa, no one is in, so they decide to go skinny dipping in the pool. It turns out to be the wrong house as the real owners show up to discover seven naked men in their pool. They get to Ally's house and begin work on the pool, meanwhile the old couple report them to the local police, and the local police make a call at Ally's. The police inspector is on the payroll of a British tabloid journalist, Nick Wheeler, who chats to them in the hotel. He thinks he has the "Sheffield Payroll" gang. The journalist meets with Kenny Ames and asks him about them. Kenny turns up at Ally's and meets the lads. He invites them to his yacht and the journalist has a photographer with him who takes pictures of the lads on board Kenny's yacht. A furious Ally turns up with the paper the following morning and shows them the article about them. Dennis suggests to Ally that he gives them the rest of the week off to appear as tourists. Oz, Moxey and Barry pop into The Office, a bar for the Brits in Marbella, and Barry doesn't want to be glamorised with the rest of the criminals and says so while talking to Terry Leather, a notorious criminal.
| 24 | "Law and Disorder" | Roger Bamford | Stan Hey | 2 May 1986 |
Ally has given the lads two days off work to reinforce the impression that they are just tourists. But Oz, Wayne, Bomber and Barry are accosted on the beach by two journalists who claim that they are aware they aren't villains, and want to clear the air. The lads are in no mood to listen, feeling they've had enough grief already. The same journalists talk to Dennis and Neville (who are staying at the villa) that night, Dennis tells them that they are all on a friends reunion after their work in Germany. The next day, the lads who are staying at the hotel all ponder what to do, Barry suggest hiring two cars and head to Gibraltar, they all agree. But this turns sour when Barry gets clamped. Oz, Bomber and Wayne end up in the Marbella Club where unbeknownst to them, Ally and Vicky are staying, and they have another altercation with the couple from the previous episode. Having cleared the air with the press, the lads return to The Office, but en route they are snapped by another photographer. After Oz angrily snatches his camera, it turns out he's not from the press, but from Scotland Yard Surveillance Squad. Meanwhile, Ally accepts that he recent brush with the law means he may never return to Britain.
| 25 | "For Better or Worse" | Roger Bamford | Dick Clement and Ian La Frenais | 9 May 1986 |
With Hazel having arrived in Spain, Barry gives her an ultimatum and they decide to get married immediately in Spain. Bomber warns Wayne off Ally's girlfriend Vicky, but Oz later makes his own move. Ally tries to work out a way of smuggling his money into Spain, so he uses Dennis to smuggle £25,000 but Dennis finds out and hides the money to give him leverage with Ally. A wedding on Kenny Ames' yacht might prove to be the answer to Ally's problems in getting money into Spain.
| 26 | "Quo Vadis, Pet" | Roger Bamford | Dick Clement and Ian La Frenais | 16 May 1986 |
This last episode has an introduction by Tim Healy, (Dennis) about the death of Gary Holton, (Wayne) and the episode is dedicated to his memory. Barry stops Hazel from phoning home about the wedding then he worries about who he’ll ask to be best man. Oz, Bomber and Moxey are in hotel bar talking about the lottery and Oz says he’d get Moxey a new face due to him being a fugitive from the law. Oz then gets a call from Vicky as she’s lonely, Ally walks in mid phone call and then they have a row about staying in Spain. Ally and Kenny discuss a contact of Kenny’s who’ll ship Ally and his money from his bank in Switzerland, from Tangiers to Spain, and then he’ll meet up with the Wedding party on Kenny’s yacht. During this conversation between Ally and Kenny, Kenny gets a call from Hazel saying the wedding is off again. Ally meets up with Barry and persuades him to go ahead with the wedding. On his return to the villa, Vicky tells Ally she won’t be there when he gets back from Switzerland. They have a big argument and Ally slashes all her designer wardrobe. Ally tells Dennis he’s away for a couple of days. Dennis tells him he’ll keep the money that Ally tried to get him to smuggle into Spain, if anything happens to him or his ex-wife or kids, the lads will all come back for revenge. Oz Goes to see Vicky and sees what Ally has done to the flat and her clothes and wants to smash his face in. Dennis stops him and tells him and Neville, that he has Ally over a barrel with his money. They finally finish the job at Ally’s villa and to celebrate they all jump into the pool. Barry decides to pick all 6 as best men for the wedding. Oz is with Vicky in the apartment when the police arrive asking about the whereabouts of Senõr Fraser. While there the lottery is drawn and the police check their numbers, and so does Oz. It turns out that Oz has won 1,000,000 pesetas (about £35,000). They are all on Kenny’s boat for the wedding when another boat with Ally turns up. Shortly after the police and coastguard turn up to arrest Ally, he instructs Kenny to head for Tangiers. Oz is worried about his lottery winnings but Hazel finds it exciting, and this is where we leave the lads at the end of series 2.

=== Series 3 (2002) ===
| No. | Title | Directed by | Written by | Original release date |
|---|---|---|---|---|
| 27 | "Bridging the Gap" | Paul Seed | Dick Clement and Ian La Frenais | 28 April 2002 |
The first episode begins with a Native American meditating over the Grand Canyon he has a vision of The Angel of the North It cuts to Dennis who is driving a minicab for a local drug dealer. Neville is running his own building company and is worried over the tax man. Moxey is working in a nightclub as a cleaner. Barry is driving around in a Bentley. Neville picks up Dennis at the railway station. Bomber is already at Oz's wake in Middlesbrough. Neville and Dennis are waiting for the Middlesbrough Transporter Bridge when they see Moxey have a motorcycle accident with the motorcycle ending up in the River Tees. They all meet up, except Wayne, and swap stories. Then Oz turns up, to the outrage of the others. He explains about the death of the old Oz and that the new Oz has a plan. They go off to see the Transporter Bridge and Oz fills them in about the plan to dismantle the Middlesbrough Transporter Bridge. Wyman (Noel Clarke) turns up being Wayne's son. He tells the others his dad died of a congenital heart defect. This news shatters the lads but Wyman is welcomed into the group. Oz goes off to meet Geoffrey Grainger, (Bill Nighy) the former disgraced MP who Oz saved from being gang raped while in prison. He is the head of the Haversham consortium who are regenerating the area around the old Transporter Bridge. He told Oz about this while inside. Oz organizes the labour with a gang master called Yorgo. Moxey is asked by the police to get some dirt on Mickey Startup, the gangster who owns the nightclub he works in. Dennis tells the lads he can't be part of Oz's deal as he has no money. Barry has dinner with Grainger to see if the deal is legit. Barry returns home via his business and discovers Kadi(his brother-in-law) is smuggling cocaine in Ladas. Moxey steals all of Mickey Startup's papers and money from his safe and then turns up on Oz's doorstep. All the lads are there apart from Dennis. They go in search of Dennis and he is driving his drug dealer around. Oz knocks the drug dealer out and Dennis re-joins the lads.
| 28 | "Heavy Metal" | Paul Seed | Dick Clement and Ian La Frenais | 5 May 2002 |
Oz's money-making plan reaches fruition and work begins on the deconstruction of the bridge. However, good times are short-lived as fights break out between rival Serbian and Kosovan workers, Startup's hit-man closes in on Moxey, and Oz stumbles upon the sorry truth behind Barry's marriage to Tatiana.
| 29 | "Bridge Over Troubled Water" | Paul Seed | Dick Clement and Ian La Frenais | 12 May 2002 |
Startup's hit-man has gone missing, so he heads up to Middlesbrough himself to find Moxey and his missing cash. Oz is forced to take decisive action over the bridge deal, exploiting his dubious sexual charms to stay one step ahead of the unscrupulous Grainger. Barry becomes suspicious of his business partner Kadi's behaviour and Oz is in for a major shock when he goes to watch his son perform at Club Tabu.
| 30 | "A Bridge Too Far" | Paul Seed | Dick Clement and Ian La Frenais | 19 May 2002 |
With the deal to sell the bridge in tatters, it looks like the lads are going to be left seriously out of pocket, until a Native American, Joe Saugus (Gordon Tootoosis), arrives in Middlesbrough with a view to buy the Transporter Bridge if the lads will reconstruct it across a canyon in the Arizona desert. Meanwhile, Barry faces up to the truth about his business and marriage.
| 31 | " Another Country" | Paul Seed | Dick Clement and Ian La Frenais | 26 May 2002 |
The lads have arrived in the USA to reconstruct the Transporter Bridge across a canyon in the Arizona desert for Joe's Native American nation. Drugs are discovered amongst their luggage and it looks like they could face a lengthy spell in prison.
| 32 | "An Inspector Calls" | Paul Seed | Dick Clement and Ian La Frenais | 2 June 2002 (Note: In parts of the BBC1 North East & Cumbria region, this episode was not shown in full on this date after lightning struck the Pontop Pike transmitter and knocked out transmission. A special repeat scheduled for 6 June saw the first complete broadcast of this episode in the region.) |
Wyman's missing; Barry's facing charges of drug smuggling; Moxey's wanted in connection with a murder in Teesside; Neville falls for a prostitute; and a vital part of the Transporter Bridge is missing. Oz has a liaison with Grainger to discover how he deceived the lads. A police detective from Middlesbrough arrives to save the day.

=== Series 4 (2004) ===
| No. | Title | Directed by | Written by | Original release date |
|---|---|---|---|---|
| 33 | "Britannia Waives the Rules" | Maurice Phillips | Dick Clement and Ian La Frenais | 4 January 2004 |
The lads complete a job in Russia, but lose their earnings when the house is destroyed in an explosion which takes out its owner, a notorious Russian crime lord. Oz runs into an acquaintance who works for Overseas Estates Development (OED), a government run agency which employs skilled workers to work in selected overseas locations. On returning to the UK, the team apply to be on the OED list. Barry is forced to stay in Russia having been arrested for his association with the now deceased crime lord, but is freed when a surprising source vouches for him – his ex-wife Tatiana. Neville does not want to travel abroad anymore – however, while on holiday in Cumbria with his daughters, he is approached by a government agent who can guarantee the lads' inclusion on the OED list provided Neville agrees to act as a covert operative. Moxey, in contrast to Neville, cannot wait to leave the UK. His links to the now imprisoned Mickey Startup, and the fact he is still officially on the run means that he prefers to be overseas. The agency refuse to allow Oz to work for them because of his recent convictions, and Neville has to intervene with his new government contact. Oz falls out with Dennis, believing that he should have done more to help him, and that he (along with the other lads) should have walked away as soon as they were told Oz wasn't allowed to go. Tensions are high between the two best friends as the gang travel to Cuba for their assignment.
| 34 | "Our Men in Havana" | Maurice Phillips | Dick Clement and Ian La Frenais | 11 January 2004 |
Having arrived in Havana, the lads are at loggerheads with their gaffer (Trasker) from the word go as he is annoyed that his preferred work crew were assigned elsewhere. Things get worse when a supposedly random Cuban girl who Wyman dances intimately with at a club turns out to be Trasker's wife. Oz is still resentful towards Dennis, and the tension between them begins to impact the whole group. Oz reluctantly attends an embassy party, and falls for a ballet dancer called Ophelia who he later goes and sees perform. Neville is approached by Tarquin from the embassy at the same party, and Tarquin reveals himself as the undercover contract from whom Neville will receive instructions. Neville is quickly warned that Tarquin is untrustworthy, but so far so good for the lads, as Tarquin's manipulative practices come to their aid when Trasker is sent home; but how long will that continue to work in their favour?
| 35 | "A Gift from Fidel" | Maurice Phillips | Dick Clement and Ian La Frenais | 18 January 2004 |
Things don't go as planned when it comes to collecting a highly prized gift from Fidel Castro.
| 36 | "Moonlighting" | David Innes-Edwards | Dick Clement and Ian La Frenais | 25 January 2004 |
Keen to impress Ofelia, a besotted Oz asks the lads to help him out – by breaking the law.
| 37 | "Dangerous Liaisons" | David Innes-Edwards | Dick Clement and Ian La Frenais | 1 February 2004 |
The pressure grows on secret spy Neville. Oz's relationship with Ofelia faces a major setback.
| 38 | "The End of the Affair" | David Innes-Edwards | Dick Clement and Ian La Frenais | 8 February 2004 |
Oz makes a huge sacrifice, before the lads unite behind Neville as he turns the tables on Tarquin.

=== Christmas specials (2004) ===
| No. | Title | Directed by | Written by | Original release date |
|---|---|---|---|---|
| 39 | "Au Revoir: Part 1" | Sandy Johnson | Dick Clement and Ian La Frenais | 28 December 2004 |
The lads are at the British embassy in an un-named city in central Africa. The embassy is under siege from locals and the staff are preparing to evacuate. While Oz and Hazel are "shagging" there is an explosion and Oz is injured by some shrapnel in his bum. Four months later he rejoins the lads in Vientiane in Laos. Oz meets Neville and Dennis outside the embassy and notices it is Australian. Dennis explains that they're on secondment. He meets the rest of the lads and apart from Bomber who it is said is still in Arizona with his new family. Moxey has a girlfriend, an Australian called Elena. Barry has a heart to heart with Oz and reveals he has reconciled with his ex-wife Tatiana. He has booked them in on the Eastern & Oriental Express. Dennis reads out a letter he received from Bomber to the lads. He says he will not be re-joining them. Then Moxey tells them he is going to emigrate to Australia with his girlfriend. Neville books himself on the orient express to go with Barry, then Barry reveals to the rest of the lads his reconciliation with Tatiana. As a farewell from the Australian embassy, the Aussies take on the Brits in a drinking darts game. Barry meets up with his ex-wife who reveals she is pregnant. The rest of the lads wonder off into Bangkok. Barry meets Neville at the station for the orient express, he tells Neville about Tatiana being pregnant. On the train they bump into Tarquin Pearce from the Cuban embassy. Oz, Dennis, Moxey and Wyman are in a sports bar and it hits Oz that the lads are history as everyone wants to go their own way. On the train Tarquin has dinner with Barry, Tatiana and Neville and explains he is developing a high class hotel but he has a problem with some local bandits. The following morning Oz and the others agree to go to an up market massage parlour. Meanwhile Barry, Tatiana and Neville go on a tour of a temple and bid farewell to Tarquin. While at the temple Barry gets snatched by bandits.
| 40 | "Au Revoir: Part 2" | Sandy Johnson | Dick Clement and Ian La Frenais | 29 December 2004 |
The lads get a call from Neville and he tells them that Barry has been kidnapped. Tatiana gets in a taxi to go to a drug store but is taken to the kidnapper’s middle man. They want £50,000. The lads go to the police with Tarquin. Tatiana returns to meet the lads and Tarquin and she gets a call from the kidnappers. While shopping in a market Moxey and Wyman are approached by a man who works with the kidnappers. He offers to take then to Barry for £550, they agree and head off into the jungle. The lads travel through the jungle by land rover then by elephant. Tarquin meets the kidnapper’s middle man who he is working with. In the morning the lads are grabbed by the kidnappers and taken to the camp, where all the lads are thrown into another hut! Oz and Dennis break out of their hut and find Barry in another hut stoned on opium. They are both caught and tortured. Dennis comes up with a plan after the lads are talking about prisoner of war films. Dennis speaks to Two Dragons (the leader of the bandits) and offers to build a wash house for the villagers. Barry joins them in their hut. While building the wash house Neville sees an opportunity to pinch a satellite phone that the kidnappers are using. The only person they could phone is Neville's wife Brenda. Neville gets her to call the OED for them to speak to the British consulate in Chiang Mai. The lads have a fight to create a diversion so Wyman can get the phone back. As he puts it back there is a text message from Tarquin and the lads realise that he has set them up. The Australians who the lads worked for in Laos come and rescue them, Oz uses the opportunity to knock out Two Dragons, the leader of the kidnappers. As they go to leave with the Australians, Dennis says they should finish the wash house as they've never not finished a job. Meanwhile the middle man Tarquin was arranging the kidnapping with takes him hostage. After a final photo we see the lads have gone their separate ways. Barry and Tatiana are in Droitwich at a pre natal class, Wyman is in a club in Ibiza, Moxey is having a BBQ in Brisbane. Oz, Dennis and Neville are in the office of OED in London. They are offered a new job, in of all places Germany. The final scene of the series is much the same as the first scene back in 1983, Dennis, Oz and Neville on the ferry to Germany, only this time looking at a photo of themselves with Bomber, Barry, Moxey and Wayne in Germany in those days. Dennis asks Neville what Brenda said about him going back to Germany, Neville replies "She said 'Auf Wiedersehen, Pet!" The scene ends with a dedication to Pat Roach, who had died before this episode was made.
