= Tom Hadaway =

English writer (1923–2005)

Tom Hadaway (18 March 1923 – 3 March 2005) was a writer for stage and television, born in North Shields in North East England.

== Early life ==
Hadaway was born on Howdon Road, North Shields on 18 March 1923. After leaving school, aged 14, he worked on the North Shields Fish Quay where the characters of fellow workers made a strong impression on him. Their characteristics and experiences would later be recalled in his writing.

== Career ==
Encouraged by the writer C. P. Taylor, who lived in nearby Newcastle and had heard his natural flair for storytelling on the radio, Hadaway began writing plays based on his experiences and observations of the region. Taylor would become a friend and mentor, advising him to write about the places and characters he knew.

Later in his career he worked on television scripts, most notably God Bless Thee Jackie Maddison (1974) as well as episodes of the drama When the Boat Comes In (1976).

He worked with Amber Films and was a key writer for Newcastle's Live Theatre Company featuring local actors including Tim Healy and Robson Green.

In 2002 he received an Honorary Doctorate of Letters from the University of Sunderland.

His Prison Plays were published in 2004, edited by Val McLane.

In March 2018, on what would have been his 95th birthday, a blue plaque was unveiled at Hadaway's birthplace by Tim Healy.
