= Movie Connections =

- Narrated by: Ashley Jensen
- Country of origin: United Kingdom
- Original language: English
- No. of seasons: 2
- No. of episodes: 16

Production
- Producer: BBC Scotland
- Running time: 40 minutes

Original release
- Network: BBC One
- Release: 10 September 2007 – 25 February 2009

Movie Connections is a BBC One documentary series which looks at the stories behind the production of popular British films, showing how they tie in with the production of other movies through the actors or actresses. The shows feature interviews with some of the cast and crew of the subject film, as well as classic footage.

The series follows Comedy Connections (2003) and Drama Connections (2005), which used the same format to look at the history of popular television comedies and dramas respectively.

The series consist of eight episodes each, all of which are narrated by Ashley Jensen.

== Films examined ==
=== Series one (2007) ===
1. Four Weddings and a Funeral (10 September)
2. The Commitments (17 September)
3. Billy Elliot (24 September)
4. Lock, Stock and Two Smoking Barrels (1 October)
5. Bend It Like Beckham (8 October)
6. Shakespeare in Love (15 October)
7. Brassed Off (22 October)
8. Gregory's Girl (5 November)

=== Series two (2009) ===
1. Monty Python and the Holy Grail (7 January)
2. Summer Holiday (14 January)
3. Sliding Doors (21 January)
4. Trainspotting (26 January)
5. Shirley Valentine (4 February)
6. Buster (11 February)
7. Local Hero (18 February)
8. Calendar Girls (25 February)
