= Sunday for Sammy =

English charity concert series

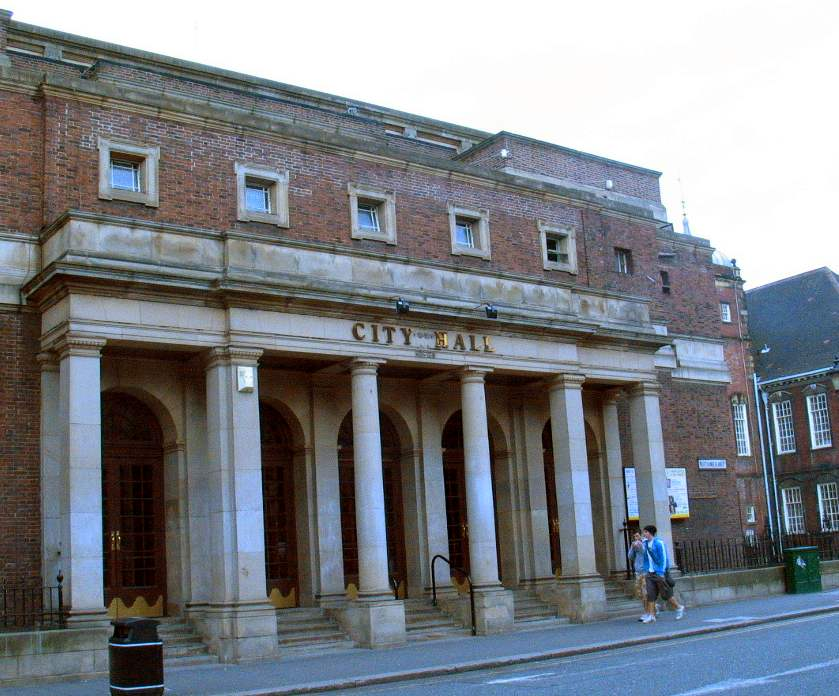
The Sunday for Sammy concerts were hosted at Newcastle City Hall, before moving to Newcastle Arena

Sunday for Sammy is a series of biennial charity concerts held in aid of the Sammy Johnson Memorial Fund, which benefits young performers. The fund was established in memorial to Sammy Johnson, an actor from North East England, who died suddenly in 1998.

The concerts have been held at Newcastle City Hall, with the exception of 2006, when the show was hosted at Sage Gateshead. Due to the popularity of tickets, the 2018 and 2020 events were held at Metro Radio Arena. Following COVID-19, the next event was expected to be held in 2023; however, "due to the cost-of-living crisis" and the high production costs, the charity's trustees decided that the event would not be a good use of the charity's funds.

The show is performed twice on one day, with each being recorded for a DVD release, from which 75% of profits go to the fund. As of 2024, there have been eleven events, with nine filmed for DVD release.

The concerts are hosted by Tim Healy and (until 2008) Jimmy Nail, who were close friends of Sammy Johnson, and features a range of personalities hailing from North East England, including Denise Welch, Billy Mitchell and Brendan Healy. It has featured guest appearances from people such as Ant and Dec and Mark Knopfler. Writers Dick Clement and Ian La Frenais contribute sketches based on their television series Auf Wiedersehen, Pet, which have featured guest appearances from the surviving original 'magnificent seven'. The concerts usually conclude with all of the performers returning to the stage to sing, most commonly Lindisfarne's "Run for Home".

Tribute shows for Sunday for Sammy are also popular. Most recently a competition for sketches was organised by North East-based playwright Ed Waugh.

== Shows ==
Number	Date	DVD number
1	2000	n/a
2	2002	n/a
3	2004	
The first show released commercially on DVD. The ensemble perform Lindisfarne's "Run for Home".
4	2006	
Performed at The Sage Gateshead. The ensemble perform "That's What Friends Are For", also featured youth ensembles Young Sinfonia and the Swing Bridge Singers. A young Matthew Healy, future frontman of the indie rock band The 1975, also performed a solo rendition of the Leonard Cohen song "Hallelujah".
5	10 February 2008	
Tim Healy opens the show with "That's Living Alright". Liam Mower, one of the first actors to play Billy Elliot in the musical in which Healy starred, appeared to dance and perform "Electricity". This was the first Sunday for Sammy concert without Jimmy Nail. Christopher Fairbank and Timothy Spall reprised their roles in an AWP sketch set in the times of Robin Hood.
6	7 February 2010	
A guest appearance from Mark Knopfler, who played extracts from a number of his songs, before playing, on the orders from a specially-recorded video message from Alan Shearer, "Going Home (Theme of the Local Hero)".
7	2012	MWMDVD106
Performances from Gavin Webster and Joe McElderry, who sings "Big River" and "Nessun Dorma". Mike Neville introduces a AWP based around King Arthur. Tim Healy sings "I'd Do Anything for Love (But I Won't Do That)" with Lorraine Crosby, the female vocalist from the original Meat Loaf recording. Healy also performs "With a Little Help From My Friends". The concert concludes with an ensemble performance of "Run for Home".
8	8 February 2014	
Chris Ramsey and Jason Cook from BBC sitcom Hebburn; Tim Healy and Lorraine Crosby sing "Up Where We Belong"; Pete Scott; The concert concludes with an ensemble performance of "Blaydon Races".
9	February 2016	
Features a tribute to the late Brendan Healy, during his traditional slot following the interval.
10	February 2018	
Held at Metro Radio Arena. With Brenda Blethyn, Tim Healy, Denise Welch, Joe McElderry, Kevin Whately, Johnny Vegas, Ryan Molloy, Charlie Hardwick, Chelsea Halfpenny, Stephen Tomkinson, Dave Johns, Jill Halfpenny, Jason Cook, Laura Norton, Christopher Fairbank, Billy Mitchell, Angela Lonsdale, Trevor Horn, Ralph McTell, Julia Tobin, Peter Peverley, Rosie Ramsey
11	February 2020	MWMDVD132
The 20th Anniversary shows were held at Newcastle Arena on 23 February 2020.
