= Children North East =

England charity

Children North East is a registered charity based in Newcastle upon Tyne, England. The focus of the charity is to provide help and funding, through community based projects, to families, children and young people in the region who are experiencing a range of problems and difficulties in their lives. In 2011, the organisation celebrated 120 years old which makes it the oldest independent children's charity in the North East of England.

== History ==
The organisation was founded in 1891 by John H Watson, a local philanthropist and John L Lunn, a wealthy shipping merchant, in the north east city of Newcastle upon Tyne. Watson was involved in organising the missionaries in the impoverished areas of the city and was approached by Lunn in June 1891, with an offer to fund a trip to the coast for some of the street children who would benefit from time away from their dismal existence.

Letter from Lunn to Watson on 15 June 1891:

'Dear Mr Watson, If there is anyone in your district convalescent or feeble to whom a fortnights stay at the seaside would be of benefit, I shall be glad to pay for their lodgings, and, if necessary, their board as well. Are there any street lads in your mission to whom a day at the seaside would be a treat? If so we might arrange a trip. Yours Sincerely, John T. Lunn''

As a result of the letter, one hundred and twenty children were gathered together by Watson and taken to the coast at Monkseaton on 11 July 1891, a trip which was financed in full by Lunn. The trip was so successful that Watson decided to write a letter for publication in the Newcastle Chronicle, appealing to the general public to send funding for further trips to the seaside to help more needy children. The following year, 600 children were sent on trips to the seaside with money donated by the public. In 1893, the association was established and was named as 'The Newcastle Poor Children's Seaside Trips Association.' The committee elected the founders, Lunn and Watson as chairman and hon secretary respectively. Each summer between May and September, groups of children selected from the districts of Newcastle and Gateshead, continued to visit the coast.

Over time, extended trips to the surrounding countryside towns such as Wark, Bellingham, Rothbury and Hexham were arranged to meet the needs of weaker children who needed the clean air and extended rest from the city. Accommodation in the country was provided by generous locals.

In 1894, night shelters were built for boys and girls living on the streets, providing a bed for the night as well as a meal. The 'Street Vendors Club' was established on Percy Street, close to the head office which at the time was located where the Eldon Square Shopping Centre stands today. The purpose of the club was to provide children with the means to earn a living other than by selling things in the street. Within the first week the club had 300 members.

In 1907, following extensive appeals to the public for funding, the 'Stannington Sanatorium' was opened as a treatment centre for sick children suffering with tuberculosis. The organisation grew from strength to strength by building up their charitable profile and taking on extra help and volunteers to hold fundraising events and manage projects, in order to distribute funds to the region's most needy children. In November 1988, the organisation registered their new name, 'Children North East', which better reflected the changing society and the variation of projects which catered for the needs of needy and vulnerable children in a range of circumstances across the region.

== The organisation ==
The aims of today's organisation are very similar to when it was first established in 1891. However, trips to the seaside are no longer part of the charity's agenda and more focus is given to improving the lives of the region's children in the long term. The objectives of the community based projects focus on improving local children's life experience, their relationships with others and building their self-esteem. The improvement of the moral as well as the physical welfare of the region's children is the priority. Whilst poverty is still an issue, the charity aims to address the needs of local children on a far wider basis, within education as well as their home life.

The head office of the organisation is now located in Denhill Park, Newcastle upon Tyne and currently employs 79 full and part-time staff as well as 120 volunteers. A number of fundraising events, a range of projects and the charities website are managed and organised from the head office.

== Fundraising events ==
Fundraising events are organised each year to raise money to support the work of the charity. Annual events include 'The Sandcastle Challenge' which is held in July and unites school children from the area at the beach at South Shields, 'The Sandcastle Ball' which is a fundraising event held on a Summers evening at one of the region's hotels and 'The Annual Golf Tournament' in which teams pay to enter, raising funds, and competing to win. The charity also has a team of participants in the Great North Run each year.

== Projects ==
The projects are wide and varied, but fit into 4 main streams; Support for Families, Support for Young People, Support for Communities and Fatherwork. The organisation's website, www.children-ne.org.uk, provides a detailed description of the projects taking place in the community. These include the WEYES project (The West End Youth Enquiry Service), Families Plus and Fathers Plus which are among a number of other ongoing projects.

== Patrons ==
The actor Tim Healy is the charity's patron.
