= Spender =

British television police procedural drama

- Genre: Police procedural
- Created by: Jimmy Nail; Ian La Frenais
- Written by: Jimmy Nail; Ian La Frenais; Kenneth Ladd; Val McLane
- Directed by: Mary McMurray; Roger Bamford
- Starring: Jimmy Nail; Sammy Johnson; Berwick Kaler; Denise Welch; Tony McAnaney; Paul Greenwood; Peter Guinness
- Theme music composer: Tony McAnaney
- Composer: Tony McAnaney
- Country of origin: United Kingdom
- Original language: English
- No. of series: 3
- No. of episodes: 21

Production
- Producers: Martin McKeand; Paul Raphaël; Peter McAleese
- Cinematography: Nigel Walters
- Editor: Martin Sharpe
- Running time: 50 minutes
- Production company: Big Boy Productions

Original release
- Network: BBC1
- Release: 8 January 1991 – 29 December 1993

Spender is a British television police procedural drama, created by Ian La Frenais and Jimmy Nail, that first broadcast on 8 January 1991 on BBC1. The series, which also starred Nail as the title character, ran for three series between 1991 and 1993, finishing with a feature-length special, The French Collection, broadcast on 29 December 1993. A total of twenty-one episodes were produced. The first and second series were produced by Martin McKeand, while the third and final series was produced by Paul Raphaël and Peter McAleese.

The series, set in Newcastle upon Tyne, focuses on the life and exploits of Detective Sergeant Freddie Spender, who was often chosen to carry out more daring police cases. With his criminal sidekick Stick (Sammy Johnson), Spender was regarded as one of the more remarkable TV detectives of the 1990s. The series featured an extensive back story for the main characters, with a number of episodes dealing with Spender's domestic life, his family and circumstances. Some of the storylines were however seen as somewhat dark; one episode featured the death of Spender's wife at the hands of a ruthless gangster, another on the kidnap of one of his daughters.

Guest stars in the series included Amanda Redman, Rodney Bewes, Frances Tomelty, Julie Peasgood, Jan Graveson, Geoffrey Hughes, Bobby Pattinson, Tom Bell and Ian McElhinney. The series was broadcast on Tuesday evenings in the peak time slot that followed the BBC's flagship Nine O'Clock News. No further series were produced following the feature-length special, despite the popularity of the show, and it being a smash hit for the BBC in terms of ratings with the show regularly pulling in 14 million viewers, and each episode costing upwards of £350,000 to produce. In 1992, a novelisation of the series, written by Nail, was published. The series has never been released on DVD.

== Development ==
Jimmy Nail initially mentioned the idea of a cop show to writer Ian La Frenais, with whom he'd worked on Auf Wiedersehen, Pet, in 1987. The BBC subsequently commissioned a pilot script, written by the latter, which was enthusiastically received; however La Frenais was too busy to work on further episodes. A producer suggested that Nail should try writing a script, which was also positively received by the BBC. Subsequently, a series of eight episodes was commissioned by the network. Not confident he could repeat the formula for remaining episodes in the series on his own, Nail moved to Los Angeles in 1989 to be closer to La Frenais as he worked on material for the series.

The second and third series were produced by Initial.

Ford provided a new Ford Sierra Sapphire RS Cosworth for each series, which served as Spender's car. Stick drove a Volkswagen Beetle. A number of Ford, Vauxhall, BMW and Range Rover cars were also featured in the series.

== Cast ==
- Jimmy Nail as DS Freddie Spender
- Sammy Johnson as Kenneth Norman 'Stick' Oakley
- Berwick Kaler as DS Dan Boyd
- Denise Welch as Frances Spender
- Tony McAnaney as Keith Moreland
- Lynn Harrisson as Kate Spender
- Dawn Winlow as Laura Spender
- Paul Greenwood as Supt. Yelland (Series 1)
- Peter Guinness as DCS Gillespie (Series 2–3)
- Brendan Healy as Eric (Series 2–3)
- Mickey Hutton as 'Spud' Tate (Series 2–3)

== Episodes ==
=== Series 1 (1991) ===
No. overall	No. in series	Title	Directed by	Written by	Original release date
1	1	"Homecoming"	Mary McMurray	Ian La Frenais	8 January 1991
After an undercover operation goes wrong in London, Spender's partner is injured. It is felt that Spender should lie low for a while. He is reluctantly sent back to his native Newcastle for what he thinks is a one-off assignment to try and get evidence against a local businessman, Spender also catches up with his ex wife and kids and also his old mate an ex building society robber 'Stick' who will become his side-kick to help him in his investigations into the murky criminal world.
2	2	"Half a Ton of Heartaches"	Roger Bamford	Jimmy Nail	15 January 1991
Spender goes undercover on an oil rig as a fitters mate after a worker is murdered and his body washed up on the shore. As Spender gets near the truth he finds the bad guys closing in on him, once he has discovered the death is to do with drug smuggling. Spender also finds out that his youngest daughter has been seriously injured in his flat while he was away on the oil rig.
3	3	"Double Jeopardy"	Mary McMurray	Ian La Frenais	22 January 1991
A group of criminals from the south have come north to team up with some local well-known muscle to pull off an armed raid. Meanwhile, Spender finds out that his best mate Keith is struggling to come to terms with his illness.
4	4	"The Candidate"	Richard Standeven	Jimmy Nail	29 January 1991
Spender is put in charge of the security of a female politician during an election because she has been receiving some death threats and poison pen letters. Spender finds that his own life is on the line trying to keep the politician alive, as someone close to her is trying to kill her.
5	5	"Iced"	Roger Bamford	Ian La Frenais	5 February 1991
A young student is killed in a motorbike accident. Spender is the godfather to the girlfriend of the dead young man. Meanwhile a known drug courier is arrested coming back into the country. Spender poses as an old friend from the army days of the courier, now turned informer. With the help of Booney, a female detective, they set about trying to find where and how the drugs are shifted around the North East. Spender finds out that the death of the young student is linked with a drug called 'ice', which is being distributed around the North East by their target.
6	6	"Dance Girl Dance"	Richard Standeven	John Harvey	12 February 1991
Young girls, recruited by a local nightclub for dancing work overseas, have been disappearing. Spender poses as a potential owner and, with Stick's help, sets up a rival club. Spender enlists the help of the sister of one of the missing girls to find out what happened to them.
7	7	"Tough"	Mary McMurray	Jimmy Nail	19 February 1991
Spender tries to find a way to help a reluctant fist-fighter escape from the clutches of his unscrupulous promoter.
8	8	"Well, Well, Well"	Mary McMurray	Jimmy Nail	26 February 1991
Spender tries to help when Stick gets involved in a dodgy deal involving stolen jewellery, and the man he was dealing with is murdered.

=== Series 2 (1992) ===
No. overall	No. in series	Title	Directed by	Written by	Original release date
9	1	"Here We Go Again"	Alan Grint	Jimmy Nail	7 January 1992
Spender is involved in a close protection operation involving members of the government. Meanwhile, Stick and former cellmate Spud get involved in a local vendetta, while Frances has a new man in her life.
10	2	"Fly By Night"	Alan Grint	Ian La Frenais	14 January 1992
Spender goes under cover at a glass factory to check out a suspect for a security van robbery. Meanwhile, Keith's friend Blakey is involved in a war between illegal fly posting outfits.
11	3	"Fee"	Ian Knox	Jimmy Nail	21 January 1992
Spender sets out to help a couple who are in trouble with a local drug dealer, and uncovers corruption in the drugs squad.
12	4	"Family Business"	Ian Knox	Ian La Frenais	28 January 1992
Spender's aunt asks him to find her son, who has been missing for eight months, and has spent most of his life in trouble.
13	5	"The Golden Striker"	Roger Bamford	Kenneth Ladd	4 February 1992
Spender is assigned to track down a footballer who has gone missing shortly after arriving home from Italy.
14	6	"At the End of the Day"	Rager Bamford	Jimmy Nail	11 February 1992
Gillespie puts pressure on Spender to arrest his criminal friends. Frances is on jury duty and is being pressured into giving a not guilty verdict. Spender investigates a series of ram-raids.

=== Series 3 (1993) ===
No. overall	No. in series	Title	Directed by	Written by	Original release date
15	1	"The More Things Change"	Ian Knox	Jimmy Nail	5 January 1993
Spender is assigned to investigate attacks on women in a local park, and investigates a small record bootlegging operation. Stick gets involved with some hot jewellery. Meanwhile, Spender, Stick and Keith all have new women in their lives, and Frances plans to remarry.
16	2	"Kid"	Ian Knox	Val McLane	12 January 1993
Spender investigates the attempted murder of a runaway teenage boy after his daughters see him fall from a clifftop.
17	3	"Puck"	Suri Krishnamma	Jimmy Nail	19 January 1993
Spender investigates a local villain and discovers he is blackmailing a local ice hockey star.
18	4	"Bad Company"	Suri Krishnamma	Stan Hey	26 January 1993
Spender is under investigation by CID as he continues his affair with the wife of a local villain. Gillespie is kidnapped.
19	5	"Best Friends"	Ian Knox	Niall Leonard	2 February 1993
Spender and Boyd investigate a series of car thefts, but Boyd is caught by the gang. Stick opens a jewellery shop, but it is robbed on its first day. Spender discovers that Keith’s girlfriend Emily is only fifteen.
20	6	"Retreat"	Ian Knox	Stan Hey	9 February 1993
Spender goes undercover as a prisoner to investigate the murder of a key witness. Stick flees Newcastle when he falls behind with his rent.
21	7	"The French Collection"	Matt Forrest	Jimmy Nail	29 December 1993
Spender is sent to Marseilles to escort Tommy Thornton back to the UK.
