= Goldie (band) =

British pop/rock band

- Publicity shot from the mid 1970s showing Black front centre and McDonald bottom right

Background information
- Origin: Newcastle-upon-Tyne
- Genres: Rock, prog rock, pop rock
- Years active: 1976-1980
- Label: Bronze Records
- Members: Dave Black; Pete McDonald; Geoff Robson; Tom Knowles; Dom Bon de Sousa Pernes

Goldie were a British pop/rock band. The band was formed by guitarist Dave Black in 1976 with members of his previous project Kestrel and following his departure from the Spiders from Mars. They are best known for the hit single "Making Up Again", which reached Number 7 in the UK Singles Chart in June 1978.

The single, as with most of their material, was written by their guitarist Dave Black and lead vocalist Pete McDonald, and it was released on the Bronze label with catalogue reference BRO 50, the track spent eleven weeks in the chart. Despite releasing follow up singles their lack of subsequent chart success made Goldie a one-hit wonder.

The song is considered a fine example of late 1970s sophisticated pop music, Pete McDonald hinted at its complexity in an interview with the Newcastle Evening Chronicle in March 1978 when he said "It's not typical of what we play on stage. It's too complex."

The band performed and recorded together for four years, and appeared on the TV show Top of the Pops. The group disbanded in 1980. Following the split Black went on to form another band 747 who did not achieve chart success, but did have a successful career in their native North East during the early 1980s. Both Black and McDonald went on to have successful solo careers and Black continued to attract crowds at his many gigs throughout the North of England until his death in July 2015. Geoff Robson, their bass guitarist, appeared on series 25 of Never Mind the Buzzcocks in September 2011.

The North East music scene was brought together in July 2015 following the death of lead guitarist and founding member Dave Black. His funeral in St George's Church, Cullercoats, the village near Whitley Bay where Dave grew up, was packed with many of musician he grew up with on the North East music scene in the 1970s, including Brian Johnson lead singer in AC/DC, and Brendan Healy, who toured with Goldie, and for whom Black later played guitar in The Brendan Healy Band.

== Band members ==
- Dave Black - guitar, vocals (died 18 July 2015; aged 62)
- Pete McDonald - vocals
- Geoff Robson - bass
- Tom Knowles - drums
- Dom Bon de Sousa Pernes - saxophone

== Discography ==
- Making Up Again (1978)
- To Be Alone (1978)
- We'll Make The Same Mistake (1979)
- How Many Times (1979)
