= Christopher Fairbank =

English actor (born 1953)

- Born: 4 October 1953 (age 73); Hertfordshire, England
- Occupation: Actor
- Years active: 1978–present

Christopher E. Fairbank (born 4 October 1953) is an English actor. He is best known in the UK for playing Moxey in the comedy-drama series Auf Wiedersehen, Pet. Fairbank has had roles in Coronation Street, Batman, Doctor Who and Shakespeare & Hathaway: Private Investigators. He has a recurring role in the Guardians of the Galaxy films as The Broker, and in two guest stints in 2024 and 2026, portrayed Eddie Knight in EastEnders.

== Early life ==
Fairbank was born in Hertfordshire on 4 October 1953. Fairbank grew up in Essex and lived in a family village shop. He was educated at a boarding school in Canterbury. His father was a freemason, who a week before he died was approached by the Duke of Kent at Addenbrokes Hospital, the hospital he was staying in, to award him with his 33rd degree in freemasonry which according to Christopher someone could only achieve if they are the Duke of Kent.

Fairbank's first experience in acting was in primary school when he played Mr. Brown for a stage production of Paddington Bear at Clavering County Primary School, in which he performed his first piece of improvisation after the pupil who was playing Paddington forgot his curtain line. This inspired Fairbank to take part in more local theatre productions.

When he was seventeen years old, he was convicted of possession of marijuana after his mother discovered cannabis in his room and was reported by his father. Fairbank was put on probation for two years, and was moved to Liverpool to live in a hostel. He would later be arrested twice during a visit to the Edinburgh fringe in 1975. Christopher lived in Liverpool for two years before he attended Royal Academy of Dramatic Art, where he graduated in April 1974.

== Career ==
=== Early career ===
When he was first starting out, Fairbank had problems with auditioners as they did not like his skin which had been affected by acne. Before his breakout role in Auf Wiedersehen, Pet, Fairbank had small roles in shows such as Z-Cars and had a recurring role in the 1979 series The Old Curiosity Shop, where he appeared in seven out of nine episodes as Kit Nubbles. He appeared in six episodes of Coronation Street between August and October 1981 as Ginger, a mechanic.

=== Auf Wiedersehen, Pet ===
In 1983, Fairbank's manager sent him to Auf Wiedersehen, Pet director Roger Bamford, during his audition he did a Scouse accent and got the part as Albert Arthur Moxey, known better in the show by just his surname, Moxey. He portrayed the character for two series in 1985 and 1986, as well as its two series revival in 2002 and 2004.

The character Moxey is a lovable rogue plasterer from Liverpool who in the first series had a stutter but over the course of the show the condition is cured. His character was a reformed arsonist with mental health problems who at one point absconds from a prison and goes on the run under different aliases. In the finale of the 2004 series he moves to Australia with his partner.

=== Film and television ===
Since then, he has been in many other films such as Batman where he played a mugger named Nic who is interrogated by Batman. In television, he has been in popular shows such as Bergerac, Coronation Street, Doctor Who, Father Brown and Shakespeare & Hathaway: Private Investigators. He has performed as a voice actor in the Aardman films Wallace & Gromit: The Curse of the Were-Rabbit and Flushed Away.

In 2010, he appeared as a detective in Five Daughters, and as Alfred "Freddie" Lennon, John Lennon's father in the biopic Lennon Naked. He has had a recurring role in the Marvel Cinematic Universe as The Broker in the films Guardians of the Galaxy (2014) and Guardians of the Galaxy Vol. 3 (2023).

On 10 December 2023, it was announced that Fairbank had been cast as Eddie Knight in EastEnders. His character first appeared in episode 6,831, aired on 1 January 2024. He and Elizabeth Counsell, who played his character's wife Gloria, were only contracted for a few episodes, as producer Chris Clenshaw only introduced them to talk on the topic of baby farming. They made their last appearance three months and 30 episodes later in episode 6,891, aired on 15 April. Their characters are written off the show with Eddie going to prison for racially aggravated murder and Gloria being killed off with a heart attack.

=== Theatre ===
His theatre debut came in 2013 when he was told by Susan Boyle that he was a good singer, which would lead to him auditiong for a production of A Christmas Carol at the Royal Lyceum Theatre in Edinburgh, Scotland, eventually landing the role of Ebenezer Scrooge. In 2015, he played Azdak in The Caucasian Chalk Circle, which was held at the same venue. In 2025 he played the role of Kemp in the Joe Orton play Entertaining Mr Sloane at the Young Vic.

== Personal life ==
Although he is one of Britain's most prolific actors and known for his versatile work, little information is online about Fairbank, as according to him "I prefer the work to speak for me because that is what I do. I'm an actor and I prefer to be judged solely for my performances".

== Filmography ==
=== Film ===
Year	Title	Role	Notes
1979	Agatha	Luland	As Chris Fairbank
1980	The Awakening	Porter	
1980	Cry Wolf	Sergeant	Short film
1985	Plenty	Spencer	
1988	Hanna's War	Ruven	
1989	Venus Peter	Blind Man	As Christopher Fairbanks
1989	Batman	Nick	
1990	White Hunter Black Heart	Tom Harrison	Also art director
1990	Hamlet	Player Queen	
1992	Alien 3	Thomas Murphy	As Chris Fairbank
1997	The Fifth Element	Mactilburgh	
2001	The Bunker	Sgt. Heydrich	
2002	Anazapta	Steward	
2002	Below	Pappy	
2005	Valiant	Additional Voices (voice)	As Chris Fairbank
2005	Wallace & Gromit: The Curse of the Were-Rabbit	Additional Voices (voice)	
2005	Goal!	Foghorn	
2006	Cargo	Ralph	
2006	Almost Heaven	Teapot Ted	
2006	Flushed Away	Thimblenose Ted, Cockroach, Passerby (voice)	
2007	Five Days: Revised Final Episode	DS Mal Curling	
2008	MindFlesh	Verdain	
2009	Goal III: Taking on the World	Foghorn	
2009	Edward's Turmoil	Grandpa	Short film
2011	Little Deaths	X	Segment: "Mutant Tool"
2011	Pirates of the Caribbean: On Stranger Tides	Ezekiel	
2012	Orthodox	Goldberg	Short film
2013	Jack the Giant Slayer	Uncle	
2014	Guardians of the Galaxy	The Broker	
2014	Hercules	Gryza	As Chris Fairbank
2015	Dragonheart 3: The Sorcerer's Curse	Potter	
2015	Writers Retreat	Nigel	
2015	Orthodox	Joseph Goldberg	
2016	Lady Macbeth	Boris	
2017	Papillon	Jean Castili	
2018	Walk like a Panther	Lesley Beck	
2018	The Fight	Frank Dunn	
2019	Tayna pechati drakona	Grey	
2020	The Show	Patsy Bleaker	
2020	Deus Otiosus: The Idle God	Deus	Short film
2021	All My Friends Hate Me	Norman	
2021	Śmierć Zygielbojma	Woolf	
2022	Guardians of the Galaxy: Cosmic Rewind	The Broker	Short film
2022	Survive This	John	Short film
2023	Guardians of the Galaxy Vol. 3	The Broker	
2025	100 Nights of Hero	Beaked Brother Charles	

=== Television ===
Year	Title	Role	Notes
1978	Z-Cars	Z-Cars	Episode: "A Woman's Place"
1978	Plain Murder	Oldroyd	TV movie
1979	The Professionals	Billy	Episode: "The Purging of CI5"; as Chris Fairbank
1979–1980	The Old Curiosity Shop	Kit Nubbles	7 episodes
1980	Noah's Castle	Cliff	6 episodes
1980	Little Lord Fauntleroy	Man filling in ditch	TV movies; uncredited
1980	Maria Marten or Murder in the Red Barn	Tom Corder	3 episodes; as Chris Fairbank
1980–1982	BBC2 Playhouse	Billy, Jerry	2 episodes
1981	Coronation Street	Ginger	8 episodes
1982	Sapphire & Steel	Johnny Jack	Serial: "Assignment Six"
1983–2004	Auf Wiedersehen, Pet	Albert Moxey	39 episodes
1985	Murder with Mirrors	Sergeant Lake	TV movie
1987	Bergerac	Sydney Sterrat	Episode: "Root and Branch"
1987	The Two Mrs. Grenvilles	Horst Berger	Episodes: "#1.1", "#1.2"
1987	Casualty	Gerald Bryant	Episode: "A Drop of the Hard Stuff"
1988	Rockliffe's Babies	Dover	Episode: "Easy Meat"
1988	South of the Border	Dennis	Episode: "#1.1"
1989	The Bill	Charles	Episode: "Grace of God"
1990	Hands of a Murderer	Jeremy Stubb	TV movie
1992	Spender	Joe Phelan	Episode: "Fly by Night"
1992	Framed	Sydney Jefferson	Episode: "#1.1"
1993	Stay Lucky	Leech	Episode: "Down to Earth"
1993	Sweating Bullets	Patrick	Episode: "Deal of a Lifetime"
1993	Prime Suspect	Chief Insp. David Lyall	Episode: "Keeper of Souls: Part 2"; as Chris Fairbank
1994	Royce	Kupchak	TV movie
1994	A Pinch of Snuff	Det Sgt Edgar Wield	3 episodes
1994	Lovejoy	Foxy Norris	Episode: "Day of Reckoning"
1994	Finney	Bobo Jnr.	6 episodes
1994–1995	Space Precinct	Breon, Burl Flak	2 episodes
1994–1996	Crocodile Shoes	Alan Clarke	8 episodes
1995	Inspector Morse	George Daley	Episode: "The Way Through the Woods"; as Chris Fairbank
1996	Into the Fire	Joyce	3 episodes
1997	True Tilda	Gavel	
1997	Silent Witness	Chris Palmer	Episode: "Friends Like These"
1997	Wokenwell	Stew Saunter	Episode: "#1.5"
1997	Underworld	Haynesie	5 episodes
1998	Invasion: Earth	Wg. Cdr. Friday	4 episodes; as Chris Fairbank
1999	The Scarlet Pimpernel	Fumier	3 episodes
2000	London's Burning	Tony	Episode: "#12.5"
2000	City Central	Mark Dixon	Episode: "History"
2000	In the Beginning	Idol Worshipper	Episodes: "Part I", "Part II"
2001	In a Land of Plenty	Bob	Episode: "#1.10"
2002	Paradise Heights	John Askins	1 episode
2003	In Deep	Harbinson	Episode: "Character Assassins"
2003	Comic Relief 2003: The Big Hair Do	Albert Arthur Moxey	TV special
2003	Spooks	Gordon Blaney	1 episode; uncredited
2005	The Rotters' Club	Roll-up Reg	1 episode
2005	A Waste of Shame	Physician	TV movie
2006	New Tricks	Tommy Gerrard	Episode: "Diamond Geezers"
2006	The Line of Beauty	Barry Groom	3 episodes
2007	Five Days	DS Mal Curling	2 episodes
2007	Diamond Geezer	Barry	Episode: "Old School Lies"
2007	Midsomer Murders	Ronnie Tyler	Episode: "Death in a Chocolate Box"
2008	Ashes to Ashes	David Bonds	1 episode
2008	Never Better	Doug	6 episodes
2008	Tess of the d'Urbervilles	Groby	4 episodes
2008	Merlin	Voice of the Black Knight (voice)	Episode: "Excalibur"
2009	Law & Order: UK	Jeff McFadden	1 episode
2010	This is Jinsy	Letley Orridge	Episode: "Bandy Dog Red"
2010	Five Daughters	DCI John Quinton	3 episodes
2010	Lennon Naked	Freddie Lennon	TV movie
2011	Hidden	George Venn	3 episodes
2012	Kidnap and Ransom	Chris Taylor	3 episodes
2012	Inspector George Gently	Billy Mallam	1 episode
2013	Borgen	Vassily Andrejev	Episode: "Fortidens sønner"
2013	Family Tree	Neville St. Aubrey	Episode: "The Box"
2013	Doc Martin	Malcolm Raynor	Episode: "Hazardous Exposure"
2014	Jamaica Inn	Harry	3 episodes
2014	Doctor Who	Fenton	Episode: "Flatline"
2015	Wolf Hall	Walter Cromwell	Episodes: "Three Card Trick", "Crows"
2015	Wallander	Sten Norlander	Episode: "The Troubled Man"
2015–2016	Dickensian	Silas Wegg	15 episodes
2016	The Secret Agent	Yundt	Episode: "#1.1"
2017	Taboo	Ibboston	3 episodes
2018	Vera	Robert Naresby	1 episode
2018	The Woman in White	Mr. Brown	2 episodes
2019	Grantchester	Eli Roper	Episode: "#4.5"
2019	Hatton Garden	Billy Lincoln	2 episodes
2020	Outlander	Aaron Beardsley	Episode: "Free Will"
2022	Shakespeare & Hathaway: Private Investigators	Don Bergius	Episode: "Die We Must"
2022	The Essex Serpent	Cracknell	2 episodes
2022	Sherwood	Bill Raggett	
2022	Andor	Ulaf	3 episodes
2024, 2026	EastEnders	Eddie Knight	31 episodes

=== Video games ===
Year	Title	Role	Notes
2002	Prisoner of War	Colonel Roger Harding	
2003	I.G.I.-2: Covert Strike	David Jone	
2004	The Getaway: Black Monday	Additional Voices	As Chris Fairbank
2006	Rule of Rose	Gregory M. Wilson	As Chris Fairbank
2006	Killzone: Liberation	General Armin Metrac	As Chris Fairbank
2006	Medieval II: Total War		As Chris Fairbank
2007	Heavenly Sword	Additional Voices	
2007	Hellgate: London		As Chris Fairbank
2008	Conflict: Denied Ops		
2008	Viking: Battle for Asgard		As Chris Fairbank
2008	Age of Conan		
2008	Fable II		
2009	Demon's Souls	Old King Doran, Yurt the Silent Chief	
2009	Killzone 2	Additional Helghast Voices	As Chris Fairbank
2009	Wheelman		As Chris Fairbank
2011	The Last Story	Narrator (voice)	As Chris Fairbank
2011	Killzone 3	Helghast Soldiers (voice)	
2011	Renegade Ops	Inferno (English version, voice)	
2012	The Secret World	Khalid El-Sayad (voice)	
2013	Divinity: Dragon Commander	Falstaff (voice)	
2013	Puppeteer	General Tiger (voice)	
2017	Warhammer 40,000: Dawn of War III	Inquisitor Holt, Space Marines (voice)	As Chris Fairbanks
2022	Lego Star Wars: The Skywalker Saga		
2022	Warhammer 40,000: Chaos Gate - Daemonhunters	Brother Purifier Ectar (voice)	

=== Theatre ===
Year	Title	Role	Company	Director |	Notes
2013	A Christmas Carol	Ebenezer Scrooge	Royal Lyceum Theatre		
2015	The Caucasian Chalk Circle	Azdak	Lyceum Theatre, Edinburgh	Mark Thomson	adaptation by Alistair Beaton
2025	Entertaining Mr Sloane	Kemp	Young Vic	Mark Thomson	by Joe Orton
