= Comedy Connections =

British TV series (2003–2008)

- Narrated by: Julia Sawalha; Doon Mackichan
- Country of origin: United Kingdom
- Original language: English
- No. of seasons: 6
- No. of episodes: 47

Production
- Executive producers: Mike Bolland (Series 1-2); Gary Chippington (Series 3); Alan Tyler (Series 4-); Toby Stevens (Director)
- Running time: 30 minutes (series 1 to 3); 40 minutes (series 4 to 6)

Original release
- Network: BBC One
- Release: 9 June 2003 – 8 November 2008

Comedy Connections is a BBC One documentary series produced by BBC Scotland that aired from 2003 to 2008. The show looked at the stories behind the production of some of Britain's comedy television programmes, showing how they tied in with the production of other comedy shows (hence "connections"). The show featured interviews with some of the cast and crew of the subject programme, as well as footage from the series.

Comedy Connections mostly documented BBC comedies and sitcoms, although two programmes have been from ITV (three counting Men Behaving Badly which moved from ITV to the BBC after two series) and two from Channel 4.

The first series consists of six episodes while the rest of the series consist of eight episodes each. The first two series were narrated by Julia Sawalha and the rest of the series by Doon Mackichan.

== Series summary ==
Series	Episodes	Originally released	
Series	Episodes	First released	Last released
1	6	9 June 2003	14 July 2003
2	8	21 June 2004	30 August 2004
3	8	21 February 2005	11 April 2005
4	8	6 March 2006	8 May 2006
5	8	12 January 2007	2 March 2007
6	8	18 July 2008	4 September 2008
Special		8 November 2008	

== Episodes ==
The first two series were narrated by Julia Sawalha and the third series onwards by Doon Mackichan.

=== Series 1 (2003) ===
Overall #	Ep #	Title	Airdate	Notes
1	1	Porridge	9 June 2003	
2	2	The Good Life	16 June 2003	
3	3	Are You Being Served?	23 June 2003	
4	4	Men Behaving Badly	30 June 2003	
5	5	Butterflies	7 July 2003	
6	6	Only Fools and Horses	14 July 2003	

=== Series 2 (2004) ===
Overall #	Ep #	Title	Air date	Notes
7	1	The Goodies	21 June 2004	
8	2	Birds of a Feather	28 June 2004	
9	3	Father Ted	12 July 2004	Featured as a special feature on the DVD box-set.
10	4	The Fall and Rise of Reginald Perrin	18 July 2004	Featured as a special feature on the DVD box-set.
11	5	Keeping Up Appearances	26 July 2004	Featured as a special feature on the US Collectors Edition DVD box-set, Australian Life lessons from Onslow DVD and Full Bouquet DVD box-set Australian releases.
12	6	The Young Ones	2 August 2004	
13	7	Hi-de-Hi!	9 August 2004	
14	8	Red Dwarf	30 August 2004	This episode was the last to be narrated by Julia Sawalha and was included as a special feature on the Red Dwarf Series 8 DVD.

=== Series 3 (2005) ===
Overall #	Ep #	Title	Airdate	Notes
15	1	Monty Python's Flying Circus	21 February 2005	Doon Mackichan becomes narrator from this episode
16	2	Spitting Image	28 February 2005	
17	3	Three of a Kind	7 March 2005	
18	4	Harry Enfield's Television Programme	14 March 2005	
19	5	Goodness Gracious Me	21 March 2005	
20	6	Not the Nine O'Clock News	28 March 2005	
21	7	A Bit of Fry & Laurie	4 April 2005	
22	8	The Two Ronnies	11 April 2005	

=== Series 4 (2006) ===
Overall #	Ep #	Title	Airdate	Notes
23	1	The Fast Show	6 March 2006	Featured as a special feature on the DVD box-set.
24	2	dinnerladies	13 March 2006	
25	3	Drop the Dead Donkey	20 March 2006	
26	4	Shooting Stars	3 April 2006	
27	5	To the Manor Born	10 April 2006	
28	6	'Allo 'Allo!	24 April 2006	
29	7	That Was the Week That Was	1 May 2006	
30	8	Ever Decreasing Circles	8 May 2006	

=== Series 5 (2007) ===
Overall #	Ep #	Title	Airdate	Notes
31	1	One Foot in the Grave	12 January 2007	
32	2	Bread	19 January 2007	
33	3	It Ain't Half Hot Mum	26 January 2007	
34	4	The New Statesman	2 February 2007	
35	5	Don't Wait Up	9 February 2007	
36	6	The Office	16 February 2007	Featured as a special feature on the 10th Anniversary DVD box-set.
37	7	Just Good Friends	23 February 2007	
38	8	Alas Smith and Jones	2 March 2007	

=== Series 6 (2008) ===
Overall #	Ep #	Title	Airdate	Notes
39	1	Till Death Us Do Part	18 July 2008	
40	2	Yes Minister/Yes, Prime Minister	25 July 2008	
41	3	The Liver Birds	1 August 2008	
42	4	Ripping Yarns	8 August 2008	
43	5	Rab C. Nesbitt	15 August 2008	
44	6	Sorry!	22 August 2008	
45	7	Dad's Army	29 August 2008	
46	8	Little Britain	4 September 2008	

=== Special ===
Overall #	Title	Airdate	Notes
47	Geoffrey Perkins	8 November 2008	The only special episode based on a person

== Spin-offs based on other TV generations ==
In 2005, the BBC broadcast Drama Connections, which used the same format, looked at the history of popular British television dramas. However, only one series was made and shown.

In 2007, the BBC broadcast Movie Connections, focusing on popular British films. A second series was broadcast in early 2009.

In 2010, ITV aired a similar programme called "Drama Trails", narrated by James Nesbitt.

== Other show based on the Comedy Connections format ==
In 2008, ITV launched their own documentary series under the title Comedy Classics mostly documenting ITV's sitcoms and comedies.

=== Series 1 (2008) ===
- On the Buses (9 September 2008)
- Rising Damp (23 September 2008)
- Doctor in the House (7 October 2008)
- Brass (14 October 2008)
- Duty Free (18 November 2008)
- The New Statesman (2 December 2008)

== See also ==
- Britain's Best Sitcom (2004)
