= Joe Fagin =

British pop singer-songwriter (1939–2023)

Background information
- Born: December 1939; Liverpool, England
- Died: 5 September 2023 (aged 83)
- Genres: Pop, rock, soft rock, country rock
- Occupation: Singer-songwriter
- Instrument(s): Vocals, guitar

Joe Fagin (December 1939 – 5 September 2023) was an English pop/rock singer-songwriter. He was best known for the 1984 chart hit "Breakin' Away / That's Livin' Alright", and for singing a version of "As Time Goes By" for the 1990s BBC sitcom of the same name starring Judi Dench and Geoffrey Palmer.

== Musical career ==
=== Early years ===
In the early 1960s, Fagin was a guitarist with a group called the Strangers, who played gigs at The Cavern Club in Liverpool, sometimes with the Beatles, and at the Star-Club in Hamburg. He then played in France with a band called the Playboys.

By the 1970s, Fagin had returned to England and worked in advertising, writing jingles. He also worked as a session musician.

=== Chart successes and TV themes ===
In 1982, Fagin had his only U.S. Billboard Hot 100 charting single, "Younger Days". It was released there on Millennium Records and peaked at No. 80. He was musical director for Jim Davidson, including his 1983 Falklands tour. In January 1984, the single "Breakin' Away / That's Livin' Alright", which were the opening and closing theme songs to the first series of the comedy-drama Auf Wiedersehen, Pet, reached number 3 on the UK Singles Chart.

In 1985, he was part of the charity supergroup the Crowd, who released the charity single "You'll Never Walk Alone" for the Bradford City stadium fire which reached number one in the UK.

"Get It Right" and "Back with the Boys Again", the two songs for the second series of Auf Wiedersehen, Pet, were also released as a single, reaching number 53 in 1986.

Fagin sang the version of "As Time Goes By" used as the theme of the sitcom of the same name.

=== Later years ===
Fagin released a greatest hits album in 1996, which included a cover of the Beatles song "She's Leaving Home".

"Breakin' Away" / "That's Livin' Alright" was re-released when Auf Wiedersehen, Pet was repeated on Channel 4 in 1996.

A reworked version of "That's Living Alright" was released on 5 June 2006 for the World Cup. However, "That's England Alright" was an unofficial song, since Embrace were chosen to record the official song for the World Cup, "World at Your Feet".

== Personal life and death ==
Fagin was born in Kirkdale, Liverpool in 1940, and trained as an electrician before beginning his music career. In adulthood, he was a longtime resident of Brixton.

Fagin and his wife, Valerie, had five children. He died on 5 September 2023, at the age of 83.
