= Drama Connections =

- Narrated by: Meera Syal
- Country of origin: United Kingdom
- Original language: English
- No. of episodes: 8

Production
- Running time: 30 minutes

Original release
- Network: BBC One
- Release: 6 September – 9 November 2005

Drama Connections is a BBC One documentary series which looks at the stories behind the production of some of Britain's most popular drama television programmes, showing how they tie in with the production of other drama shows (hence the name). The shows feature interviews with some of the cast and crew of the subject programme, as well as classic footage from the series.

The series is a spin-off from Comedy Connections, which began two years earlier and used the same format to look at the history of popular television comedies, and was followed by Movie Connections in 2007.

== Shows examined ==
=== Series One (2005) ===
Narrated by Meera Syal

1. Auf Wiedersehen, Pet (6 September)
2. Pride and Prejudice (13 September)
3. Tenko (27 September)
4. Minder (11 October)
5. House of Cards (18 October)
6. Prime Suspect (25 October)
7. The Singing Detective (1 November)
8. I, Claudius (9 November)

The I, Claudius episode was originally scheduled for 4 October 2005.
