= Breakin' Away / That's Livin' Alright =

Single by Joe Fagin
- A-side: "Breakin' Away / That's Livin' Alright"
- Released: 1983
- Genre: Rock
- Length: 3:02
- Label: Towerbell Records
- Songwriter(s): David Mackay; Ian La Frenais ("Breakin' Away"); Ken Ashby ("That's Livin' Alright")
- Producer(s): David Mackay

Joe Fagin singles chronology
"Younger Days" (1982)	"Breakin' Away / That's Livin' Alright" (1983)	"Money Money" (1984)

"Breakin' Away" / "That's Livin' Alright" is a double A-side single by English singer Joe Fagin. The songs were produced and arranged by David Mackay.

Mackay co-wrote "Breakin' Away" with Ian La Frenais, and "That's Livin' Alright" with Ken Ashby. They wrote the songs as the opening and closing theme music for Auf Wiedersehen, Pet, an English television comedy-drama that premiered in 1983. Ian La Frenais co-wrote Auf Wiedersehen, Pet with Dick Clement.

"That's Livin' Alright" peaked at No. 3 on the UK Singles Chart in January 1984. Later that year, Friends Records (Netherlands) and Mariann Grammofon (Sweden) reissued the song as an A-side 7" single titled "That's Living Alright".

For England's national football team's 2006 FIFA World Cup campaign, Fagin performed "That's England Alright", a variation of "That's Livin' Alright" produced by Clive Langer, with lyrics by Jimmy Lawless.

== Track listing ==
All music is composed by David Mackay.

No.	Title	Lyrics	Length
1.	"Breakin' Away"	David Mackay, Ian La Frenais	3:02
2.	"That's Livin' Alright"	David Mackay, Ken Ashby	2:55
Total length:			05:57
