= Peter Birch (actor) =

British actor

Peter Birch (31 August 1952 – 13 September 2017) was a British actor born in Harrogate into a military family which travelled worldwide. He was educated at the Duke of York's Royal Military School, Bristol University and Bristol Old Vic Theatre School. His notable roles included appearances as Herr Ulrich in the comedy drama series Auf Wiedersehen, Pet, consultant Jack Hathaway in the drama series Casualty (1996–1997) and Arthur Eliott in The House of Eliott. In 1983, he appeared in the film .
