= Auf Wiedersehen, Pet =

British television comedy drama series

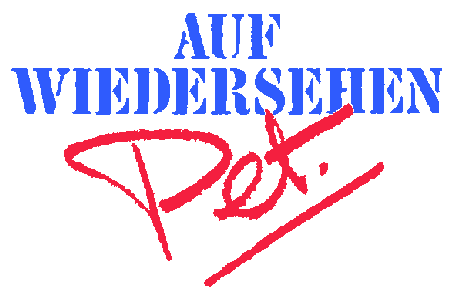
- Created by: Franc Roddam
- Written by: Ian La Frenais; Dick Clement; Stan Hey (1983–1986); Bernie Cooper (1984); Francis Megahy (1984)
- Directed by: Roger Bamford (1983–1986); Baz Taylor (1983–1984); Anthony Garner (1986); Paul Seed (2002); David Innes Edwards (2004); Maurice Phillips (2004); Sandy Johnson (2004)
- Starring: Tim Healy; Kevin Whately; Jimmy Nail; Timothy Spall; Christopher Fairbank; Pat Roach; Gary Holton; Noel Clarke
- Country of origin: United Kingdom
- Original language: English
- No. of series: 4
- No. of episodes: 40 (list of episodes)

Production
- Executive producers: Allan McKeown (1983–1986); Franc Roddam (2002–2004); Laura Mackie (2002–2004)
- Producers: Martin McKeand (1983–1986); Roger Bamford (1986); Chrissy Skinns (2003); Joy Spink (2002–2004)
- Cinematography: Tim Palmer (2004)
- Editors: Dave King (2002); Les Healey (2004)
- Running time: 50 minutes (1983–1986); 60 minutes (2002–2004)
- Production companies: WitzEnd Productions (1983–1986); Central Independent Television (1983–1986); Ziji Productions (2002–2004)

Original release
- Network: ITV
- Release: 11 November 1983 – 16 May 1986
- Network: BBC One
- Release: 28 April 2002 – 29 December 2004

Auf Wiedersehen, Pet (German pronunciation: [ʔaʊf ˈviːdɐˌzeːən ˈpɛt]) is a British comedy drama television programme about seven British construction workers who leave the United Kingdom to search for employment overseas. In the first series, the men live and work on a building site in Düsseldorf. The series was created by Franc Roddam after an idea from Mick Connell, a bricklayer from Stockton-on-Tees, and mostly written by Dick Clement and Ian La Frenais, who also wrote The Likely Lads, Whatever Happened to the Likely Lads? and Porridge. It starred Tim Healy, Kevin Whately, Jimmy Nail, Timothy Spall, Christopher Fairbank, Pat Roach and Gary Holton, with Noel Clarke replacing Holton for series three and four and the two-part finale. The series were broadcast on ITV in 1983–1984 and 1986. After a sixteen-year gap, two series and a Christmas special were shown on BBC One in 2002 and 2004.

In 2000, series 1, set in Germany, was ranked number 46 on the 100 Greatest British Television Programmes in a list compiled by the British Film Institute. In 2015, the 1980s series was voted ITV's Favourite TV Programme of all Time in a Radio Times readers' poll in order to celebrate the 60th anniversary of the station. The show was the subject of the first episode of the BBC documentary series Drama Connections in 2005.

== Series 1: 1983–1984 ==
The first series, co-produced by Witzend Productions and Central Television for ITV in 1983, is the story of seven out-of-work construction workers from various parts of England who are forced to look for work in West Germany as a result of the recession and high unemployment of the early 1980s, although its initial emphasis is on three bricklayers from Newcastle upon Tyne making the journey to Germany, with the others being introduced along the way. (The title refers to their farewells to their wives and girlfriends – "Auf Wiedersehen" being German for "Farewell" or "Goodbye", or more literally "See you later", and "Pet" being a North-East English term of endearment.)

External videos
- Oz's ignorance needles Dennis

They find work on a German building site in Düsseldorf but, despite promises of hostel accommodation, are forced to live in a small hut that reminds them of a World War II POW camp. The rest of the series is driven by the interactions and growing friendships between the various characters. Barry (Timothy Spall), a "spark" from the Black Country, is an obsessive bore; Neville (Kevin Whately), one of the Geordie "brickies", is an insecure young newlywed; fellow Geordie Oz (Jimmy Nail), another bricklayer, is aggressive and jingoistic; and London "chippy" Wayne (Gary Holton) is a womaniser. Dennis (Tim Healy) is another Geordie bricklayer who, being older, more experienced and generally more mature than the others, becomes the de facto leader of the group. Bristolian "brickie" and wrestler Bomber (Pat Roach) being the oldest is usually the calmest and sense of reason in the group; Scouse ex-con plasterer Moxey (Fairbank) is a jittery, recidivist arsonist. Over the course of 13 episodes the "Magnificent Seven" enjoy comic, dramatic, and romantic adventures, until a change in German tax laws forces them to return home.

The "building site" used for most of the filming was a set created on the backlot of the former ATV Elstree Studios at Borehamwood in Hertfordshire (then owned by Central). After its sale to the BBC in 1984, the "Albert Square" set of EastEnders was built there. Such was the attention to detail that the producers imported thousands of bricks from West Germany as these were slightly bigger than those used on English building sites.

The show was one of the first to use lightweight video cameras, including the Philips LDK 14S, on location in drama production. Previously used in electronic news-gathering they were more versatile and cheaper to use than studio-based cameras. Interior scenes (such as those in the bar) were shot in studios at Borehamwood. Some location filming was conducted in Hamburg, despite the series being set in Düsseldorf. In these scenes, most of the cars' registration numbers begin with HH denoting Hamburg (HH = Hansestadt Hamburg).

The location sequences in Hamburg and Düsseldorf actually only lasted 10 days. The Intercontinental hotel which Dennis, Wayne and Barry visit in episode 7, titled "Private Lives", was the same hotel in which the cast and crew stayed while filming there.

In the last episode of the series, "When The Boat Goes Out", the hut on the site where the gang live accidentally catches fire and burns down. The ruins shown on the end credits were the actual ruins of the hut that was used for filming.

The first series was placed at number 46 in the British Film Institute's 100 Greatest British Television Programmes list compiled in 2000.

== Series 2: 1986 ==
The second series of 13 episodes in 1986 saw the boys reunited, initially to help Barry complete extensive building work on his new home in Wolverhampton. Dennis is working for a crooked businessman, Ally Fraser (played by Bill Paterson), to whom he owes money. Dennis encourages the rest of the gang to help renovate a country manor house owned by Fraser, Thornely Manor, but they end up falling foul of the locals. Fraser then invites the boys to Spain to complete his swimming pool at his Spanish villa. Once in Spain, the gang are mistaken for criminals themselves and the series ends with them fleeing the Spanish police in a motor yacht, together with Barry's new wife, who had only expected a wedding at sea.

The second series had several on-set problems. Actor Gary Holton died before some of the final indoor scenes were filmed, and the scripts had to be reworked to explain Wayne's absence from these indoor scenes. Examples of this include various characters enquiring about Wayne's whereabouts, only to be told that he was chatting up a girl in the next room or that he had gone away for the day. A double was used in other scenes, such as one where Bomber manhandles Wayne away from Ally's girlfriend in a nightclub. The transmission of the final episode of Series 2 (Quo Vadis Pet) saw an introduction by Tim Healy dedicating the episode to Holton.

In his autobiography, Nail said he was glad to be done with filming, not just because of Holton's death but because he felt the second series lacked the gritty edge of the first series, something Dick Clement and Ian La Frenais later said they agreed with. On the audio commentary for series two, Clement said the series was much more contrived in getting and keeping the gang together, and La Frenais said he felt the gang weren't trapped together enough like they were in Germany in the hut. In particular, he felt the Spanish episodes were too luxurious for the gang: instead of sleeping rough, having arguments, and clashing with the Spanish locals, they were often seen relaxing in summer clothes, and occasionally had female partners tagging along, which reduced the impact of the series.

Despite these concerns, the ratings remained high throughout. The episode titled "Marjorie Doesn't Live Here Anymore", which Clement and La Frenais described as their favourite in the second series because it was "drab and grey looking", and "added some meat to Oz's character", was not only the most watched episode of the show's run but drew in the highest audience percentage out of all the channels on the night of its screening, with sixteen million viewers.

Location scenes in the UK were shot around the villages of Caunton, Nottinghamshire, Redmile, Leicestershire and Denton, Lincolnshire. Roundhill Primary School, Beeston, Nottinghamshire was used as the location for 'Walker Street Middle School'. Some scenes were also filmed in West Bridgford, Nottinghamshire. Location shooting in Newcastle lasted for four days at the end of August 1985. Studio scenes were filmed at Central's new studios in Nottingham, replacing those at Borehamwood.

In 1988, ITV decided to show repeat episodes of Auf Wiedersehen, Pet against EastEnders, the BBC's then twice-weekly soap that had grown considerably in popularity since its launch in 1985. The episodes had originally been shown in a late evening slot and hence were very adult in content; ITV wanted to show them during family viewing time, and also in a 30-minute slot. Consequently, they cut each 50-minute episode into two 25-minute ones, thus turning the 26 episodes of the first two series into 52. The shows had to be further edited to remove adult language and sexual references to make them suitable for the desired family-viewing timeslot, and hence the plots often became confusing as key scenes were removed and much of the humour was lost. From 5 April 1988, the edited shows began an ITV network run, slotted on Tuesdays and Thursdays at 7.30pm in direct competition with EastEnders on BBC One. There were viewer complaints about the editing, and after a few weeks Thames and TVS both opted out of the run and instead showed the original uncut episodes at 10.30pm on Mondays. The majority of ITV regions stayed with the edited run until its natural end in September.

== Educating Oz Sketch ==
The Dennis and Oz characters were reunited for a one-off educational sketch for Tyne Tees in 1986. Made at the height of the AIDS epidemic, it consists of Northern Life presenter Paul Frost and Peter Jones, director of the Haemophilia Centre in Newcastle, discussing HIV/AIDS transmission and prevention in a TV studio, but cuts back and forth to a skit set in a pub, where Dennis and Oz are watching the broadcast, and are themselves discussing the issues over a pint of beer. In the conversation, Dennis becomes increasingly frustrated at Oz's typically ignorant views towards sexual fidelity, safe sex practices, homosexuality and drug abuse. Eventually Jones enters the pub for real and then explains the issues directly to Oz, who eventually takes heed.

== Series 3: 2002 ==
Sketches written and performed for the Sunday for Sammy charity concerts inspired Clement and La Frenais to revive the series. In 2002, the show was revived, this time as a six-part series produced by Ziji Productions for BBC One and aired from 28 April to 2 June 2002. The original writers and all of the surviving cast returned, joined by Noel Clarke as Wayne's son Wyman. The characters all appeared to have moved on: Moxey was no longer a wanted criminal; Oz had given up drinking; Barry ran a seemingly successful business exporting out-of-date food and Lada cars back to Russia (in reality smuggling drugs into the country, a fact Barry was unaware of); Neville and his wife Brenda ran a building company called Nevenda Homes supplying pre-built homes from Scandinavia to DIY home builders. Dennis was now a taxi driver whose biggest fare was on Tuesdays and Fridays driving a drug dealer around the area. The series' storyline revolves around a plan by corrupt politician Jeffrey Grainger (played by Bill Nighy), whom Oz had met in prison, to dismantle the Middlesbrough Transporter Bridge (a real-life industrial landmark) and sell it for reconstruction in the Far East. Persuading Oz to get the old gang back together to dismantle the bridge, he then plans to cheat them out of their share of the profits, until a Native American, Joe Saugus (played by Gordon Tootoosis), from Arizona, arrives to buy the bridge for the benefit of his tribe's casino after seeing an advert placed online by Oz. The lads fly to his reservation to reconstruct the bridge.

Each episode except the first featured a re-cap of the previous episode's events in a voiceover from Dennis, a feature not continued in the fourth series.

The special-effects depicting the dismantling of the bridge were so realistic that many people believed it was really being removed, forcing the BBC to add a caption to the final episode reassuring them that it was still there. Middlesbrough Council also issued a press release stating that the bridge remained in situ.

Despite some initial scepticism that the revival would not work, the show was an immediate hit. It won the National Television Award for Best Drama, and a British Comedy Award for Best Comedy Drama. In a later television documentary, original executive producer Allan McKeown stated that he had been deeply disapproving of the series' revival and requested that it not be titled Auf Wiedersehen, Pet. However, this was refused and he fell out with La Frenais as a result, though they later reconciled.

== Comic Relief sketch ==
Some of the cast made an appearance on Comic Relief's Red Nose Day 2003, in which they find a suitcase full of money in a Miami hotel room and assume it belongs to a drug dealer who wants to shoot them; it actually belongs to U2 who invite them to their penthouse.

== Series 4: 2004 ==
A fourth series of six episodes was aired on BBC One from 4 January to 8 February 2004. The characters now work as building subcontractors for the British Embassy after a building job in Moscow goes badly wrong and are given a tip off from a friend of Oz who tells them about specialised embassy work. The team are posted to Havana to completely refurbish the British ambassador's new residence. They also carry out some unofficial building work for Oz's Cuban girlfriend's family.

Neville is reluctantly recruited as a spy for British Intelligence before they leave the UK and is duped into working for Tarquin Pearce, the press liaison officer at the Embassy, Oz falls in love with prima ballerina Ofelia Ortiz, Barry finds himself in prison on the edge of a nervous breakdown, Moxey becomes a guinea pig trainer and Dennis ends up in a relationship with Wyman's mother.

Despite extensive negotiations between the BBC and the Cuban government, it was not possible to obtain permission to film in Cuba, so the series was filmed in the Dominican Republic.

== Au Revoir: The two-part special ==
Two one-hour episodes were shot in Bangkok and Chiang Mai in July - August 2004, and broadcast on BBC One on 27 and 28 December. (The episodes had no on-screen titles, but were listed as "Au Revoir" on the official BBC episode guide.) Shooting in Bangkok took place partly in the red-light district Soi Cowboy. Pat Roach, although suffering from cancer, had hoped to appear in the two-part special, but was not well enough and died in July. Instead, Dennis reads a letter from Bomber to the rest of the group while they are dining in a restaurant, where he explains his reasons for not having joined them. The group lift their glasses and drink a toast: "To Bomber!".

The story sees the remaining six working in a British Embassy somewhere in central Africa that is about to be overrun by rioters. Most of them escape uninjured, except for Oz who sustains a painful injury to the rectum protecting a female staff member (while they are having sex) from a bomb.

The boys then move on to Laos and later Thailand, where Barry's Russian ex-wife, Tatiana, turns up to announce that she is carrying his child following a brief "reconciliation" back in the UK. After working for the Australian embassy, Neville accompanies Barry and Tatiana for a journey upon the Eastern & Oriental Express in which they meet, by coincidence, Tarquin Pearce. During a stopover on this trip, Barry is kidnapped and held by guerrillas in a village in the jungle. When the others find out and follow they are also captured. They end up being imprisoned in a bamboo hut but are treated kindly by the local villagers. Eventually, Dennis has an idea (inspired by the film The Bridge on the River Kwai) to build a washhouse for the villagers to keep their minds occupied during their ordeal. After obtaining the guerrilla leader's satellite phone whilst he is asleep, Neville manages to call for help to Brenda, and as a result the army and the Australian embassy locate them. It turns out that the man who arranged their kidnapping was Neville's corrupt handler, Tarquin Pearce (from Series 4). Deprived of their hostages, the guerrillas decide to take Tarquin hostage instead.

In the final scenes Dennis, Neville and Oz ask the embassy to give them an assignment in a nice peaceful country, and return to Germany once more, and the trio are on the ferry from England -just as they were in the opening scene of the first episode of Series 1. Neville is asked what Brenda said to him when he told her he was heading off to Germany; he replies that she said "Auf Wiedersehen... Pet." Following a dedication to Pat Roach, the closing credits of the final episode are accompanied by the opening theme tune from Series 1, and Dennis produces a photograph that he found in his home, showing the original 7 as they were, in Germany, a throwback to the first episode of Auf Wiedersehen, Pet.

== Characters ==
=== Main cast ===
Dennis Longridge Patterson
Dennis (Tim Healy) is the reluctant, co-opted leader of the "Magnificent Seven". When introduced, he is in the middle of divorcing his wife Vera. He later has an affair with a German on-site secretary named Dagmar, played by Brigitte Kahn. In series two, he is working for a Newcastle upon Tyne gangster, Ally Fraser, to whom he has fallen in debt. Dennis has two children and can sometimes be short-tempered, but is basically a thoughtful man of high moral standards and has good people skills. At the opening of the third series, he is driving a mini-cab for a living and supplementing his income, much to his own shame, by working as a drug-dealer's driver.
Neville Hope
Neville (Kevin Whately) is often under the thumb of his wife, Brenda. Honest and hard-working, he constantly worries about the welfare of his wife and three children, and his heart is in Newcastle. He married young and has no regrets, although by the third series he is suffering from a mid-life crisis. In series four Neville comes of age working secretly for British Intelligence in Cuba.
Leonard Jeffrey "Oz" Osborne
In the original series, Oz (Jimmy Nail) was a loud, belligerent, abrasive, heavy-drinking Geordie lout who showed no fidelity towards his wife or any concern for his son. He had a xenophobic attitude to Germans, and later to Turks and Spaniards. His major passions in life were drinking and supporting Newcastle United football club. At the end of the second series, he wins the Spanish lottery and spends much of his new-found wealth on presents for his friends, but has squandered all his money by the beginning of the third series, in which he re-unites his five surviving pals at his own phoney funeral as a ruse to reunite the entire team.
Barry Spencer Taylor
Barry (Timothy Spall) is a bright, well-meaning West Midlander from the Black Country. (He mentions connections with West Bromwich and Wolverhampton and has a poster of Wolverhampton Wanderers F.C. on the wall of his office.) He is an electrician with a large, often stilted vocabulary and a motorbike, and is also dull, bumbling and bashful. His inadvertent tendency to bore others and to look on the bleak side of things is mocked by his mates, but they retain some affection for him. He has been married twice, first to a local girl named Hazel (played by Melanie Hill), who left him for another woman, which is found out in the third series. He then later marries the glamorous Russian Tatiana played by Branka Katić. Both marriages end in divorce, but, at the end of the special two-part series, he is reconciled with Tatiana, especially now that she is expecting his child a result of an encounter back in the UK.
Albert Arthur Moxey
Moxey (Christopher Fairbank) is the only character not introduced in the first episode. He is a Scouse plasterer with bad acne and, originally, a stutter, although he has clearly had it cured by the time of the third series. Despite his friendly exterior, Moxey has a dark side: he is a convicted - albeit reformed - arsonist and does try to explain that it is more of a mental illness and that he always tries to ensure that no-one is in the building to be burned (Series three). At the beginning of the second series, he absconds from an open prison, and is thereafter on the run, under the aliases "Brendan Mulcahy" and "Francis Fogarty". During series three, it emerges that he is now free from prison but that the local police need Moxey's help to gather information against Moxey's corrupt employer, Mickey Startup. He emigrates to Australia in the final episode of the special two part series with his new Australian girlfriend.
Brian "Bomber" Busbridge
Bomber (Pat Roach) is an easy-going 6'5" West Country brickie, heavily built and extremely strong, with a bushy beard. He occasionally works as a wrestler in professional wrestling promotions. He follows Bristol City F.C. although he is seen wearing a Bristol Rovers blue and white quartered shirt in series 4. One of the older brickies, he is quiet but friendly, well liked by his workmates, and is often the voice of reason and good sense. When the lads find themselves in trouble, they often turn to Bomber for help, even Oz. He is affectionate with his wife and teenage daughter but has an unfortunate habit of spending his earnings on gambling and prostitutes.
Wayne Winston Norris
Wayne (Gary Holton) describes himself as a Jack the Lad. A Londoner, he is a carpenter (or "chippy") by trade and has an obsession for women which often lands him and his friends in trouble. Initially without transport, he relied on friends for lifts but by series 2 he has bought a red BMW 520. At the end of the first series, Wayne marries Christa, (played by Lysette Anthony), a secretary at the building site. The actor Gary Holton died in 1985 after overdosing on drugs and before the filming of the second series finished. Wayne's absence in the second series is often explained in dialogue with phrases like "He's gone to town to look for girls". The series was not filmed in chronological order, so he is present in the final episode yet absent during earlier scenes. The last episode is dedicated to Gary Holton.
Wyman Ian Norris
Wyman (Noel Clarke) is Wayne's son and is introduced in series three at the "funeral for Oz", where they find out that Wayne died from a congenital heart problem a few years previously. Wyman is a DJ but then decides to join the gang to try to make some money on the bridge job, and to find out more about his father, whom he never knew. In later episodes, when the gang work for the OED, Wyman works as a general labourer.

=== Supporting cast ===
==== Wives, girlfriends and exes ====
- Julia Tobin as Brenda Elizabeth Hope: Wife of Neville (Series 1–4 & Special)
- Lysette Anthony as Christa Norris: Girlfriend of Wayne. Later wife, then ex-wife (Series 1 & mentions in Series 2)
- Caroline Hutchison as Vera Patterson: First wife, later ex-wife of Dennis (Series 1)
- Brigitte Kahn as Dagmar: Girlfriend of Dennis (Series 1)
- Sheila Reid as Patsy Busbridge: Wife of Bomber (Series 1)
- Su Elliot as Marjorie Osborne: Wife, later ex-wife of Oz (Series 1 & 2)
- Maya Woolfe as Uli (Series 1): A German woman who Oz falls in love with. Oz tells her he has his own construction business to impress her, and she tells him that she is a beauty consultant, but actually works at a massage parlour for her Turkish boyfriend, as Bomber discovers.
- Melanie Hill as Hazel Taylor: first "awful wedded wife" of Barry (Series 2)
- Madelaine Newton as Christine Chadwick: Girlfriend of Dennis (Series 2). An ex-wife was mentioned in series 3, but she was not specifically named as Christine and so was probably a reference to Vera.
- Lesley Saint John as Vicky: Girlfriend of Ally Fraser and then Oz (Series 2)
- Branka Katić as Tatiana Taylor: 2nd wife of Barry (Series 3–4 & Special)
- Georgina Lightning as Lainie Proudfoot: Girlfriend, later common-law wife, of Bomber (Series 3)
- Josefina Gabrielle as Ofelia Ortiz: Ex-girlfriend of Oz (Series 4)
- Zoë Eeles as Tina: Ex-girlfriend of Wyman Norris (Series 4): was the assistant of Tarquin Pearce and a love interest for Wyman Norris. It is speculated that she has had a sexual relationship with Tarquin. Tina and Wyman's romance ended when the lads completed their work in Cuba.

==== Series 1 ====
- Michael Sheard as Herr Gerhardt Grünwald: The site manager. His first name is only mentioned in the novel adaptations.
- Peter Birch as Herr Hans Ulrich: Grünwald's charge-hand. His first name is only mentioned in the novel adaptations.
- Michael Elphick as Magowan: A violent alcoholic thug who was always looking for trouble, yet was never fired for his antics as he was one of the best bricklayers on site. Most of the lads feared him, except Oz, who got on well with him, and Bomber, who was too big for Magowan to intimidate. When he was evicted from the hostel for assaulting staff, Oz invited Magowan to stay in the hut, much to the dismay of the other lads. By the time the lads had left Germany, Magowan had finally been imprisoned for his aggressive behaviour.
- Heinz Bernard as Herr Pfister: The agent who signed up the lads to work in Düsseldorf and pays their wages. Fell afoul of Magowan one time after arriving late due to car problems, ending up with a bloodied nose and covered in gravel.
- Lucinda Edmonds as Tracy Busbridge: Bomber's sixteen year old daughter who runs away from home and shows up at the building site, unaware that her father has gone back to England to find her.
- Ray Winstone as Colin Latham: was a soldier who went on the run following a rough time with some of his fellow soldiers. He met the lads when they visited the German countryside, and he went to work with them in Düsseldorf. Dennis and Neville later persuaded him to return to the army, and he remained in touch with Neville via letters.
- Des Young as Hedley Irwin: A steelworker from Darlington whom Dennis and Neville meet in hospital. Hedley tells them he has lived in Germany since the war and was in the army before being cashiered for marrying a German woman. He dies in hospital, and Dennis and Neville think Hedley should be buried in England.
- Norah Fulton as Mabel Hilton: Hedley's sister, married to Bob (James Ottoway). Wayne visits her and tells her that Hedley has passed on. She reveals that Hedley was court-martialled for selling headlamps to the Russians, and that he was married before he left England.
- Ray Knight as the barman: The barman at the pub where the lads spend most of their spare time.

==== Series 2 ====
- Bill Paterson as Alasdair 'Ally' Fraser (Series 2): Dennis's boss. Fraser is a businessman in the Newcastle area, with businesses including a sauna, casino and a nightclub. Fraser is widely regarded as a villain by the Geordie characters and it becomes known at the end of the series when he is residing in Marbella that he is wanted by the police back in the UK.
- Val McLane as Norma: is Dennis Patterson's older sister. She let Dennis live at her house when he divorced his wife Vera. She disapproved of her brother's association with Ally Fraser. She was also close to Brenda and Neville Hope. She wasn't happy when Moxy and Oz began sleeping in her front room. She was not seen nor mentioned after Series 2 in the series per se, however Val McClane appeared in character as Norma at the 2006 Sunday for Sammy charity variety show at The Sage, Gateshead. The character of Norma was quickly added to the scripts shortly after filming on the second series began to replace Dennis' wife Vera, when actress Caroline Hutchison (who was originally set to reprise her role and had attended script read-throughs and rehearsals) was diagnosed with cancer and was subsequently unable to appear.
- James Booth as Kenny Ames: The former owner of Thornley Manor. Ames is living in exile in Marbella as he is wanted by the police for his criminal activities, which include a pornography empire. Ames is an associate of Ally Fraser.
- Bryan Pringle as Arthur Pringle: the snobbish, grumpy landlord of the lads' local when they were staying in Derbyshire. He was often irritated by the lads, especially Oz and Wayne. He seems to dislike Wayne the most, due to Wayne seducing his daughter Carol, and as punishment, he bans Wayne and the rest of the lads from his pub, but after it is revealed that he once attended a sex party hosted by Kenny Ames, he is blackmailed into lifting the ban.
- Catherine Rabett as Carol Pringle
- Kevin Lloyd as Harry Blackburn: A plumber and Country & Western enthusiast from Derby. He is always dressed in cowboy gear and drives a Nissan Patrol
- Ying Tong John as Big Baz: Ally Fraser's minder. Although he appears to be hard man, he has been beaten by both Bomber and Oz, with Bomber breaking his nose and hand and Oz stunning him.
- John Bowler as Howard Radcliffe: Architect on the Thornley Manor refurbishment.
- James Bate as Malcolm Hallwood. Ally Fraser's solicitor. In early drafts of the scripts, the character was called Malcolm Harbottle.
- Simon Smith as Trevor: Barry's apprentice.
- Barry Hollinshead as Rodney Osborne: Oz's ten-year-old son.
- Eric Mason as Terry Leather. The character was based, in part, on Ronnie Knight. Leather is a member of the criminal fraternity living in exile in Marbella.
- Stephen Tiller as Nick Wheeler: A hack journalist who thinks the lads are the "Sheffield Payroll" gang, and after speaking to Signor Fuentes and Kenny Ames, sends his report back to the English press, much to the ire of Ally Fraser.
- Kenny Ireland and Bernard Martin as Sid Payne and Ronnie Williams: A pair of journalists trying to rubbish Nick Wheeler's story. An altercation at the beach with Oz, Wayne and Bomber doesn't get them anywhere. They get into Ally's villa, where Dennis tells them they are on a reunion from their time in Dusseldorf.
- Patrick Godfrey and Georgine Anderson as Geoffrey and Pauline Oxlade: A retired couple, neighbours of Ally Fraser. The Lads mistake their villa for Fraser's and go for a skinny dip in their pool.
- Ricardo Montez as Signor Fuentes: The Spanish policeman who investigates the lads when they mistakenly dive into a swimming pool belonging to the Oxlades. Fuentes later appears in the final episode to investigate Ally Fraser's abuse of Vicky. Montez then reappears in Series 4 as the grandfather of Ofelia Ortiz who idolises Fidel Castro.
- Joseph Long as Carlos: The barman at the Bella Vista Hotel. The lads' drinking into the early hours forcing Carlos to remain at the bar convinces his wife he has another woman. By the final episode, his wife has left him.
- Roger Rowland as Rev.Ian Burton, the vicar who befriends Barry during his brass rubbing excursion at the local parish church.
- Stephen Greif as Prince Stefano, an Italian aristocrat who invites Hazel and a reluctant Brenda aboard his luxury yacht in Marbella.

==== Series 3 ====
- Bill Nighy as Jeffrey Grainger: A disgraced politician who met Oz in prison. Grainger is a member of the consortium responsible for the demolition of the Middlesbrough Transporter Bridge. Grainger is shown to make media appearances to promote his autobiography in which he claims he is a reformed character. However, it is clear that his business dealings are dishonest.
- Emily Bruni as Sarah: Grainger's personal assistant and later love interest of Oz.
- Liz White as Lorraine: Neville's secretary whom he fantasizes over during his mid-life crisis.
- Michael Angelis as Mickey Startup: Moxey's employer at his nightclub. Startup is a Liverpudlian criminal, involved in human trafficking and sexual slavery.
- Zelda Tinska as Irena: A young woman brought into the country illegally with her two brothers and several others. She is separated from her brothers by Mickey Startup who wants her to work in his brothel. She escapes to search for her brothers who are working on the demolition of the bridge.
- John Kazek as Yorgo: An eastern European gangmaster who supplies illegal labour for the bridge demolition.
- Gordon Tootoosis as Joe Saugus: A Native American chief who travels to the UK to procure the bridge, to be rebuilt on his reservation to bring trade to his casino.
- Aleksandar Mikich as Dhori: Irena's brother.
- Dragan Mićanović as Kadi: Originally introduced as Barry's brother-in-law and business partner, it is revealed he is in fact Tatiana's lover and he has been using the business as a front for a drug smuggling operation.
- Mark Stobbart as Rodney Osborne: Now grown up and reunited again with Oz. Oz is pleased to discover Rod is a professional singer, but is shocked to learn he is a drag artist and is homosexual.
- Branka Katic as Tatiana

==== Series 4 ====
- Javier Alcina as Raúl Ortiz
- Sandra James-Young as Chrissie: Wyman's mother
- Caroline Harker as Pru Scott-Johns
- Clive Russell as Gary Turnbull
- Alexander Hanson as Tarquin Pearce
- David Cheung as Michael Goy
- Hector Then as Neville's Minder

== Music ==
The opening and closing credits for the first two series were each accompanied by songs performed by Joe Fagin. In series one, "Breakin' Away", written by David Mackay and Ian La Frenais, accompanied the opening credits. Ken Ashby collaborated with Mackay on "That's Livin' Alright", a song that closed each episode. The songs were released as a 7" single, and reached number three in the UK Singles Chart in January 1984. It was reissued in 1995 when the show was repeated on Channel 4. With new lyrics by Jimmy Lawless, Fagin released a special version of "That's Livin' Alright" for England's national football team's 2006 FIFA World Cup campaign. "That's England Alright" was released on 5 June 2006.

Mackay and La Frenais also collaborated on "Get it Right", the song used for the opening credits of series two. Like the first series, Ken Ashby collaborated with Mackay for series two's closing credits song, "Back With the Boys Again". The two tracks were released together as a double-sided single, but only reached number 53 in the UK charts in April 1986.

The tradition of using two separate songs was broken when the BBC revived the show. Instrumental music opened each episode of the third series. However, the closing credits were accompanied by Mark Knopfler's song "Why Aye Man", taken from his album The Ragpicker's Dream. Incidental music was used for the fourth series and for the special. However, when the character of Dennis reveals a photograph of all of the original group taken in Germany, "Breakin' Away" begins and continues over the final credits of the show. A CD is now available entitled 'The Best of Auf Wiedersehen, Pet One & Two' and contains 29 tracks of vocal music and instrumentals.

== Commercial availability and repeat broadcasts ==
Auf Wiedersehen, Pet is available on DVD in the UK and US as boxsets and single discs with three episodes on each. The show was largely repeated on ITV1 and ITV4 but the show has not been re-run on these channels since 2008. The programme was shown on Men & Motors for a while, but the channel has since closed.

In June 2012, Digital Channel Yesterday picked up the rights to repeat the first three series of the show; these were then shown at 10 am and 4 pm on Weekdays. Yesterday had to edit the third series' episodes to fit into their timing schedules; therefore instead of them being 60 minutes in length they were reduced to 45 minutes. This was not apparent with the repeats of the first two series. In January 2013, Yesterday bought the fourth series but, again due to timing, these were also edited from 60 to 45 minutes, meaning several parts of the storyline been cut. From July 2013, Drama picked up the rights to rerun the series as part of its schedules. In January 2017, it was repeated on Yesterday again.

In January 2021, series 1 and 2 were added to the UK’s BritBox and series 3 and 4 were added to BBC iPlayer. In April 2024, the rights to repeat series 1 and 2 were returned to ITV4, as well as made available to stream on ITVX. Series 3 and 4 are no longer available on iPlayer.

== Home releases ==
- The Complete First Series was released in a carry-case boxed set on 27 May 2002 by Carlton.
- The Complete Second Series was released in a box set on 8 July 2002 by Carlton.
- The Complete Series 1 & 2 box set was released on 7 October 2002 by Carlton.
- The Complete Brand New Series was released on DVD & VHS on 18 November 2002 by VCI.
- The Complete Fourth Series was released on DVD & VHS on 9 February 2004 by VCI.
- The Special was released on DVD on 10 January 2005 by VCI.
- The Complete Series 1 & 2 was re-issued by ITV Studios Home Entertainment on 1 September 2008.
