= Tim Healy (actor) =

British actor (born 1952)

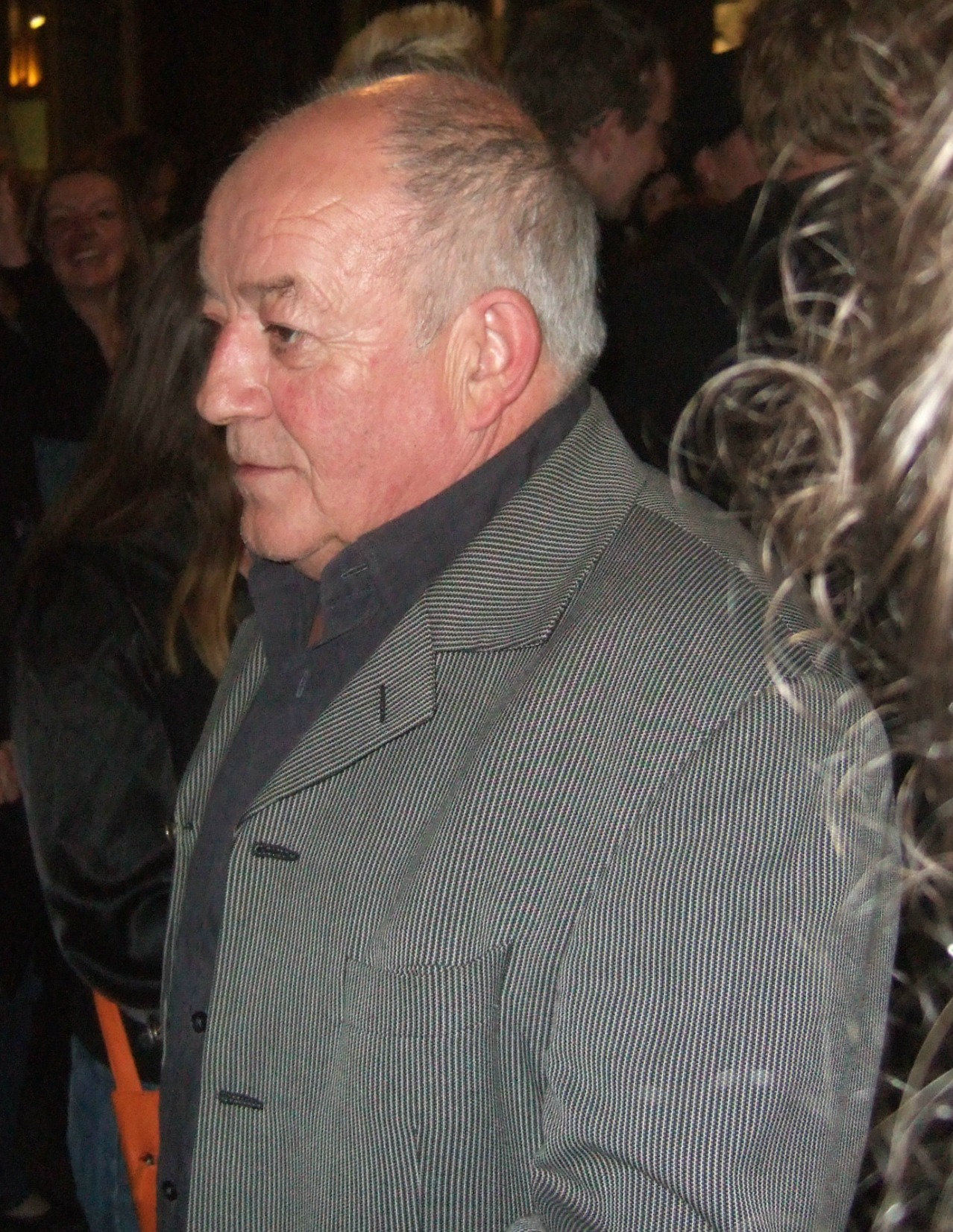
- Healy in 2007
- Born: Timothy Malcolm Healy; 29 January 1952 (age 74); Newcastle upon Tyne, England
- Occupation: Actor
- Years active: 1976–2023
- Spouses: Denise Welch (m. 1988; div. 2012) Joan Anderton (m. 2015)
- Children: 2, including Matty Healy

Timothy Malcolm Healy (born 29 January 1952) is an English actor. He played Dennis Patterson in the comedy-drama series Auf Wiedersehen, Pet (1983–2004), Lesley Conroy in the sitcom Benidorm (2009–2018), and Gastric in the comedy series Still Open All Hours (2014–2019).

== Early life ==
Timothy Malcolm Healy was born in the Benwell area of Newcastle upon Tyne on 29 January 1952, the son of Sadie (née Wilson) and Timothy Malcolm Healy Sr.

He grew up in Ouston, County Durham, west of Birtley, Tyne and Wear, in former Chester-le-Street (district). He attended Pelton Secondary Modern School in Pelton, County Durham.

He worked as a welder in a factory and joined the British Army, serving part-time in the 4th Battalion, Parachute Regiment. In 1973 he successfully responded to an advert for the Northern Arts School, obtaining a student grant and moving into acting. He was an early member of the Live Theatre Company, a touring company that put on drama productions in community halls and working men's clubs.

== Career ==
In 1982, Healy appeared in A Captain's Tale, depicting the triumph of West Auckland F.C. in the Sir Thomas Lipton Cup. In 1983, Healy was brought to public attention for his role in Auf Wiedersehen, Pet a TV comedy drama series about British builders working in Germany.

In 1984 Healy appeared in the Minder episode "A Star is Gorn", in which he played George, an enforcer for Cyril Ash, a crooked music agent.

During the mid-1980s, Healy played Barney Bodger, the blundering handyman in the Children's ITV series Tickle on the Tum, becoming a favourite with young viewers.

In the early-1990s, he appeared as a cockney ex-pat in the BBC series Boys From The Bush and played a binman in Common as Muck. In 1994, he appeared in one episode of the fourth series of Heartbeat, he played Cedric Shanks. In 2001, Healy appeared in the surreal BBC situation comedy Breeze Block, playing the head of a strange family. Healy had high hopes for the series, but was reportedly upset when it was only screened on the digital channel BBC Choice (later relaunched as BBC Three) and never broadcast on BBC One or BBC Two. He starred as a folk musician in the first episode of comedy series, Phoenix Nights. His band, "Half a Shilling", sang a song called "Send the Buggers Back", supposedly about a pair of Holy Communion shoes, but clearly intended as a racist anthem. He played Jackie Elliot in the West End musical Billy Elliot.

Healy appeared in the film Purely Belter as the abusive father of delinquent teenager Gerry and appeared in Coronation Street as Paul Jones, the father of barman Sean Tully. Healy previously appeared on the show in 1976 as a bingo caller. In 2002, Healy appeared as DS Philip Carter in an episode of Silent Witness. 2003, Healy appeared as Inspector Colin Duggan in an episode of the BBC drama Murder in Mind. In 2009, Healy appeared in the BBC drama Waterloo Road as a Security Guard, Dave Miller, a love interest for Steph Haydock, played by his wife at the time, Denise Welch. In 2013, Healy appeared as Eric in the Sky Living Sitcom The Spa for one series.

When Healy's ex wife, Denise Welch, was a guest on The Paul O'Grady Show, an apparently aged man came on the show to talk about a subject. He sounded unwell while Welch was speaking, and to her and everyone's surprise, he revealed himself to be Healy. Healy appeared in the third series of the ITV comedy Benidorm playing a cross dresser called Lesley. He later became a regular in the fourth series in 2011.

Healy has also had a role in Vic Reeves and Bob Mortimer's show Catterick as a helpful man with a chronically cold wife. In November 2013, he filmed a cameo in the first episode of the second series of the BBC sitcom Hebburn.

In September 2009, Healy became the voice of The Greener Company – a wood-burning stove company based in Lymm, Cheshire. Working in conjunction with The Greener Company and Smooth FM, Healy plays the role of David – The Wood-Burning Stove fitter for The Greener Company. David is a character in a series of radio commercials used to promote the company.

He played Gastric in Still Open All Hours (2014–2019).

== Personal life ==
Healy married actress Denise Welch in 1988. They have two sons; their older son, Matty, is the lead singer of the band The 1975. They divorced in 2012.

Healy married Joan Anderton in 2015.

He is an avid supporter of Newcastle United.

== Philanthropy ==
Healy often shows support for the children's charity, Children North East, which is based in Newcastle, by making appearances at events and showing support at their community-based projects. The charity raise funds for youth projects, such as WEYES project, in the west end area where Healy grew up.

He co-founded the Sammy Johnson Memorial Fund, established to support young talent in North East England. He hosts the biennial Sunday for Sammy concerts in aid of the fund.

== Filmography ==
=== Television ===
Year	Title	Role	Notes
1976	Coronation Street	Bingo caller	1 episode
1976	Crown Court	Matthew Cole	1 episode
1977	When The Boat Comes In	Reilly (Rivet Catcher)	1 episode
1977	Emmerdale	Steven	3 episodes
1977	Here I Stand	Guy	1 episode
1982	The World Cup: A Captain's Tale	Charlie Hogg	Television film
1983–2004	Auf Wiedersehen, Pet	Dennis Patterson	
1984	Minder	George	Episode: "A Star is Gorn"
1984–1988	Tickle on the Tum	Barney Bodger	
1987	A Perfect Spy	Syd Lemon	
1988–1990	A Kind of Living	Brian Thompson	
1989	Casualty	Ken Gardner	Episode: "Victim of Circumstances"
1991–1992	Boys from the Bush	Reg Toomer	
1993	Cracker	Mr Lang	2 episodes
1994	Heartbeat	Cedric Shanks	Episode: "Turn of the Tide"
1994	Frank Stubbs Promotes	Sandy	1 episode
1994	Common As Muck	Foxy	
1996	Soldier Soldier	Mr Osbourne	1 episode
1997	The Student Prince	Mr Grimes	Television film
1997	King Leek	Matthew Cromer	Television film
1997–1998	The Grand	Jacob Collins	
1998–2000	Heartburn Hotel	Harry Springer	Sitcom
1999	Bostock's Cup	Bertie Masson	
2000	A Dinner of Herbs	Mr Mulcaster	
2001	Phoenix Nights	Mike Fiddler	Series 1 Episode 1
2001	The Lost World	McArdle	2 episodes
2002	Silent Witness	DS Philip Carter	1 episode
2002	The Jury	Eddie Fannon	3 episodes
2002	Breeze Block	Ralph Breeze	
2003	Murder in Mind	Colin Duggan	Episode: "Cornershop"
2003	Magic Grandad	Magic Grandad	
2004	Catterick	Ian	
2004	Dalziel and Pascoe	Mike Pitman	Episode: "Great Escapes"
2005	Dead Man Weds	Paul King	
2005	The Last Detective	Harvey Troupe	1 episode
2006	Coronation Street	Brian Tully	4 episodes
2007	Dream Team	John Jackson / Dave	1 episode
2008	Inspector George Gently	Old Jim Hardyment	S1:E3 Bomber's Moon
2009	Waterloo Road	Security Dave	5 episodes
2009–2018	Benidorm	Les / Lesley Conroy	
2013	The Spa	Eric	1 series
2013	Hebburn	Stuart	Episode: "Welcome Home"
2014–2019	Still Open All Hours	Gastric	
2015	People Behaving Badly	Narrator	
2021	Wonderful World of Trucking	Narrator	

=== Film ===
Year	Title	Role	Notes
1996	The Snow Queen's Revenge	Eric (voice)	
1998	Shadow Run	Daltrey	
2000	Purely Belter	Mr McCarten	
2004	School for Seduction	Derek	
2008	Sunday for Sammy	Dennis	
2008	Alberts Speech	Eric	Short
2009	Faintheart	Geoff	
2011	United	Tommy Skinner	
2011	Man in Fear	Sargent Brown	Short
2021	You Are Not Alone	Narrator	Short
