= Roger Whittaker discography =

- Studio albums: 41
- Live albums: 11
- Compilation albums: 16
- Singles: 87
- Foreign studio albums: 48
- Foreign compilation albums: 27
- Box sets: 10
- French-language singles: 20
- German-language singles: 40

This is the discography of British folk and pop singer Roger Whittaker.

== Albums ==
=== Studio albums ===
==== UK and US studio albums ====
Title	Album details	Peak chart positions									Certifications
Title	Album details	UK	CAN	DEN	FIN	GER	NL	NOR	NZ	US	Certifications
Whistle Stop!	Released: December 1968; Label: Columbia; Formats: LP	—	—	8 (Note: Charted in 1973 when released as Alle Go'e X 12.)	1	—	—	—	—	—	
This Is Roger Whittaker	Released: July 1969; Label: Columbia; Formats: LP	—	—	—	16	—	—	—	—	—	
I Don't Believe in If Anymore	Released: June 1970; Label: Columbia; Formats: LP	23	70	2	—	—	—	—	—	—	
New World in the Morning	Released: April 1970; Label: RCA; Formats: LP; US album	—	—	—	—	—	—	—	—	—	
New World in the Morning	Released: March 1971; Label: Columbia; Formats: LP; UK release contains different tracks	45	—	—	—	—	—	5 (Note: Charted in Norway in 1976.)	—	—	UK: Gold
A Special Kind of Man	Released: April 1971; Label: RCA; Formats: LP; US album	—	95	—	—	—	—	—	—	—	
Roger Whittaker Sings...	Released: December 1971; Label: Columbia; Formats: LP	—	—	5	7	—	—	—	—	—	
Loose and Fiery	Released: March 1972; Label: RCA; Formats: LP; US album	—	—	—	—	—	—	—	—	—	
For My Friends...	Released: 1972; Label: Columbia; Formats: LP	—	—	—	—	—	—	—	—	—	
In Orbit	Released: April 1974; Label: Columbia; Formats: LP, MC	—	—	11	—	—	—	—	—	—	
The Magical World of Roger Whittaker	Released: January 1975; Label: Music for Pleasure, RCA; Formats: LP, 8-track	—	—	—	—	—	—	—	—	—	
Ride a Country Road	Released: July 1975; Label: EMI; Formats: LP, MC	—	—	—	—	24	—	—	—	—	
Reflections of Love	Released: August 1976; Label: EMI, RCA; Formats: LP, MC, 8-track	—	—	—	—	26	—	2	—	—	
A Time for Peace (The Roger Whittaker Christmas Album)	Released: November 1976; Label: EMI, RCA; Formats: LP, MC, 8-track; Released in the US in 1978	—	—	—	—	—	—	18	—	—	CAN: Platinum
Folk Songs of Our Islands Vol: 1	Released: November 1977; Label: EMI, RCA; Formats: LP, MC, 8-track; Released in the US as Folk Songs of Our Time	89 (Note: Charted in 1986 when re-released as The Skye Boat Song and Other Great Songs of Our Islands with the additional tracks "The Skye Boat Song" and "Dirty Old Town".)	—	—	—	—	—	—	—	—	
Roger Whittaker Sings the Hits	Released: 3 November 1978; Label: Columbia; Formats: LP, MC	52	—	—	—	—	—	—	7	—	NZ: Platinum
Imagine	Released: November 1978; Label: RCA; Formats: LP, MC, 8-track; US album	—	—	—	—	—	—	—	—	—	CAN: Gold
Love Lasts Forever	Released: February 1979; Label: Columbia; Formats: LP, MC	—	—	—	—	—	—	—	—	—	
When I Need You	Released: March 1979; Label: RCA; Formats: LP, MC, 8-track; US album	—	—	—	—	—	—	—	—	115	
Mirrors of My Mind	Released: October 1979; Label: RCA; Formats: LP, MC, 8-track; US album	—	65	—	—	—	—	—	—	157	
Voyager	Released: January 1980; Label: Columbia, RCA; Formats: LP, MC, 8-track	—	—	—	—	—	—	—	—	154	
Wishes	Released: February 1980; Label: Columbia; Formats: LP, MC	—	—	—	—	—	—	—	—	—	
With Love	Released: October 1980; Label: Columbia, RCA; Formats: LP, MC, 8-track	—	84	—	—	—	—	—	—	175	
Changes	Released: September 1981; Label: Columbia, RCA; Formats: LP, MC, 8-track	—	—	—	—	—	—	—	—	—	
The Wind Beneath My Wings	Released: May 1982; Label: RCA; Formats: LP, MC, 8-track; US album	—	—	—	—	—	—	—	—	—	
My Favourite Love Songs	Released: May 1983; Label: EMI, Suffolk Marketing; Formats: LP, MC, 8-track; Released in the US as All Time Heart-Touching Favorites	—	92 (Note: Charted in Canada when released in 1985 as Songs from the Heart.)	—	—	—	45	—	18	—	CAN: Gold
Roger Whittaker in Kenya	Released: January 1984; Label: Tembo; Formats: LP, MC	—	—	—	—	—	—	—	—	—	
Take a Little – Give a Little	Released: November 1984; Label: Tembo, RCA; Formats: LP, MC	—	—	—	—	—	—	—	—	—	
Tidings of Comfort and Joy	Released: November 1984; Label: Tembo; Formats: 2xLP, MC; Released in the US as World's Most Beautiful Christmas Songs	—	—	—	—	—	—	—	—	—	CAN: Platinum
The Genius of Love	Released: March 1986; Label: Tembo, RCA; Formats: LP, MC	—	—	—	—	—	—	—	—	—	
Best Loved Ballads	Released: June 1987; Label: Heartland Music; Formats: 2xLP, 2xMC; US album	—	—	—	—	—	—	—	—	—	
Living and Loving	Released: 12 September 1988; Label: Tembo, Capitol Nashville; Formats: CD, LP, MC	—	—	—	—	—	—	—	—	—	
I'd Fall in Love Tonight	Released: July 1989; Label: Universal; Formats: CD, LP, MC; US album	—	—	—	—	—	—	—	—	—	
Love Will Be Our Home	Released: 6 November 1989; Label: Word, A&M; Formats: CD, LP, MC	—	—	—	—	—	—	—	—	—	
You Deserve the Best	Released: October 1990; Label: RCA, Capitol Nashville; Formats: CD, LP, MC	—	—	—	—	—	—	—	—	—	
Celebration	Released: September 1992; Label: Tembo, RCA; Formats: CD	—	—	—	—	—	—	—	—	—	
Danny Boy & Other Irish Favorites	Released: 15 February 1994; Label: RCA; Formats: CD, MC	—	—	—	—	—	—	—	—	—	
What a Wonderful World	Released: 12 April 1994; Label: RCA; Formats: CD, MC	—	—	—	—	—	—	—	—	—	
The Christmas Song	Released: 14 September 1995; Label: RCA; Formats: CD, MC	—	—	—	—	—	—	—	—	—	
On Broadway	Released: September 1995; Label: RCA; Formats: CD, MC	—	—	—	—	—	—	—	—	—	
Awakening	Released: August 1999; Label: RCA; Formats: CD	—	—	—	—	—	—	—	—	—	
"—" denotes releases that did not chart or were not released in that territory.

==== Foreign English-language studio albums ====
Title	Album details	Peak chart positions						Certifications
Title	Album details	AUT	CAN	DEN	GER	NOR	NZ	Certifications
If I Were a Rich Man	Released: 1967; Label: Columbia; Formats: LP; Released in Belgium	—	—	—	—	—	—	
Roger Whittaker... Again	Released: 1972; Label: Philips; Formats: LP, MC; Released in the Netherlands and Scandinavia	—	—	2	—	—	—	
All of My Life	Released: 1974; Label: Philips; Formats: LP, MC; Released in Norway	—	—	—	—	—	—	
An Image to My Mind	Released: 1974; Label: Philips; Formats: LP, MC; Released in Germany, Scandinavia, New Zealand and South Africa	—	—	5	—	—	39	
The Last Farwell	Released: 1974; Label: Philips; Formats: LP, MC; Released in the Netherlands and Scandinavia	—	—	—	—	1	—	
Travelling with Roger Whittaker	Released: April 1975; Label: RCA; Formats: LP, MC, 8-track; Released in Canada	—	8	—	—	—	—	CAN: Gold
The Last Farewell	Released: 1975; Label: AVES; Formats: LP, MC; Released in Germany and Austria	6	—	—	28	—	—	
Image to My Mind	Released: 1977; Label: AVES; Formats: LP, MC; Released in Germany and Austria	—	—	—	—	—	—	
Feelings	Released: 1979; Label: AVES; Formats: LP, MC; Released in Germany and Austria	—	—	—	—	—	—	
You Are My Miracle	Released: 1980; Label: AVES; Formats: LP, MC; Released in Germany and Austria	—	—	—	—	—	—	
Sentimental Journey	Released: 1984; Label: Avon; Formats: LP, MC; Released in Germany	—	—	—	—	—	—	
Bitter & Sweet (Songs for Love and Tears)	Released: 1988; Label: Avon; Formats: CD, LP, MC; Released in Germany	—	—	—	—	—	—	
Moments in My Life	Released: April 2004; Label: BMG; Formats: CD	—	—	—	—	—	—	
"—" denotes releases that did not chart or were not released in that territory.

==== French-language studio albums ====
Title	Album details	Peak chart positions
Title	Album details	CAN (QUE)
Mon pays bleu / Mistral	Released: July 1970; Label: RCA; Formats: LP, 8-track; Released in Canada	1
Un monde est né	Released: 1970; Label: Philips; Formats: LP; Released in France	—
C'est ça ma vie...	Released: June 1971; Label: RCA; Formats: LP, 8-track; Released in Canada	1
La ballade de l'amour et Mammy Blue	Released: October 1972; Label: RCA; Formats: LP, 8-track; Released in Canada	—
Hello! Bonjour! Happy Day!	Released: May 1974; Label: RCA; Formats: LP, 8-track; Released in Canada	3
Stop in Paris	Released: 1975; Label: RCA; Formats: LP; Released in France	—
12 nouvelles chansons	Released: 1975; Label: RCA; Formats: LP, 8-track; Released in Canada	—
Dans le bleu, dans le ciel	Released: 1976; Label: RCA; Formats: LP, MC, 8-track; Released in Canada	—
À nos amours	Released: 1977; Label: RCA, EMI; Formats: LP, MC, 8-track; Released in Canada; Also released in the UK the following year	—
Le temps des amours	Released: 1981; Label: RCA; Formats: LP; Released in Canada	11
"—" denotes releases that did not chart or were not released in that territory.

==== German-language studio albums ====
Title	Album details	Peak chart positions				Certifications
Title	Album details	AUT	GER	NL	SWI	Certifications
Mein deutsches Album	Released: 1979; Label: AVES; Formats: LP, MC	—	24	—	—	
Zum Weinen ist immer noch Zeit	Released: 1982; Label: AVES; Formats: LP, MC	—	26	—	—	
Typisch Roger Whittaker	Released: 1983; Label: AVES; Formats: LP, MC	6	10	—	—	GER: Platinum
Weihnachten mit Roger Whittaker	Released: 1983; Label: Avon; Formats: LP, MC	—	3	—	—	GER: 2× Platinum
Ein Glück, daß es dich gibt	Released: 1984; Label: Avon; Formats: LP, MC	2	2	—	14	GER: 2× Platinum
Du gehörst zu mir	Released: 1985; Label: Avon; Formats: CD, LP, MC	6	2	—	13	GER: Platinum
Heut bin ich arm – heut bin ich reich	Released: 1987; Label: Avon; Formats: CD, LP, MC	—	15	—	—	GER: Gold
Du bist nicht allein	Released: 1988; Label: Avon; Formats: CD, LP, MC	14	7	95	—	GER: Gold
Festliche Weihnacht	Released: 1988; Label: Avon; Formats: CD, LP, MC	—	—	—	—	GER: Gold
Nur wir zwei	Released: February 1990; Label: Intercord; Formats: CD, LP, MC	—	30	—	—	
Alle Wege führen zu dir	Released: September 1990; Label: Intercord; Formats: CD, LP, MC	14	31	—	—	AUT: Gold; GER: Gold
Mein Herz schlägt nur für dich	Released: October 1991; Label: Intercord; Formats: CD, LP, MC	22	42	—	—	
Stimme des Herzens	Released: September 1992; Label: Intercord; Formats: CD, LP, MC	27	13	—	—	AUT: Gold; GER: Gold
Geschenk des Himmels	Released: October 1993; Label: Intercord; Formats: CD, LP, MC	—	31	—	—	
Sehnsucht nach Liebe	Released: August 1994; Label: Ariola; Formats: CD, MC	—	41	—	—	
Ein schöner Tag mit Dir	Released: November 1995; Label: Ariola; Formats: CD, MC	—	33	—	—	
Einfach Leben	Released: 7 October 1996; Label: Ariola; Formats: CD, MC	38	37	—	—	
Zurück zur Liebe	Released: 6 April 1998; Label: Ariola; Formats: CD, MC	—	35	—	—	
Wunderbar geborgen	Released: 16 October 2000; Label: Ariola; Formats: CD, MC	—	39	—	—	GER: Gold
Mehr denn je	Released: 21 October 2002; Label: Ariola; Formats: CD	70	—	—	—	
Der weihnachtliche Liedermarkt	Released: 17 November 2003; Label: Ariola; Formats: CD	—	—	—	—	
Mein schönster Traum	Released: 13 September 2004; Label: Ariola; Formats: CD	58	57	—	—	
Liebe endet nie	Released: 28 March 2008; Label: Ariola/Sony Music; Formats: CD	35	44	—	—	
So viele Jahre mit Euch	Released: 12 March 2010; Label: Ariola/Sony Music; Formats: CD	45	81	—	—	
Wunder	Released: 14 September 2012; Label: Ariola/Sony Music; Formats: CD	—	70	—	—	
"—" denotes releases that did not chart.

=== Live albums ===
Title	Album details	Peak chart positions								Certifications
Title	Album details	CAN	CAN (QUE)	DEN	GER	NOR	SWE	NZ	US	Certifications
Dynamic	Released: October 1967; Label: Columbia; Formats: LP	—	—	—	—	14 (Note: Charted in 1976 when released in Norway as Mexican Whistler.)	—	—	—	
Got to Head On Down the Road (Live at Lansdowne)	Released: July 1973; Label: Columbia; Formats: LP, MC	—	—	3	—	15	—	—	—	
En spectacle au Québec	Released: November 1973; Label: RCA; Formats: LP, MC, 8-track; Released in Canada; released in Europe as Live at the Palais des Arts	—	11	23	—	—	—	—	—	
Live with Saffron	Released: 1975; Label: Philips, EMI; Formats: 2xLP, MC; Also released as Live in Canada; was released in the US as Live in Concert in 1981	—	—	—	—	—	22	—	177	
In Concert	Released: April 1976; Label: AVES; Formats: 2xLP, MC; Originally Germany and Austria release; not released in the UK until 1981	—	—	—	42	—	—	—	—	
En spectacle	Released: 1977; Label: RCA; Formats: LP, 8-track; Released in Canada	—	—	—	—	—	—	—	—	
Live in Vienna	Released: October 1979; Label: EMI; Formats: LP, 2xLP, MC	28	—	—	—	—	—	38	—	CAN: Gold
Live at the Opera House	Released: February 1986; Label: RCA; Formats: LP; Released in Australasia	—	—	—	—	—	—	—	—	
In Concert – Die Stimme für Millionen	Released: 30 October 1989; Label: Intercord; Formats: 2xCD, 2xLP, 2xMC; Released in Germany	—	—	—	—	—	—	—	—	
Live from the Tivoli	Released: December 1990; Label: Tembo; Formats: CD, MC; Released in Canada	—	—	—	—	—	—	—	—	
Live in Berlin	Released: January 2004; Label: Ariola; Formats: CD; Released in Germany	—	—	—	83	—	—	—	—	
"—" denotes releases that did not chart or were not released in that territory.

=== Compilation albums ===
==== UK and US compilation albums ====
Title	Album details	Peak chart positions					Certifications
Title	Album details	UK	DEN	NOR	NZ	US	Certifications
"The Last Farewell" and Other Hits	Released: April 1975; Label: RCA; Formats: LP, MC, 8-track; Released in the US	—	—	—	—	31	US: Gold
The Very Best of Roger Whittaker	Released: August 1975; Label: Columbia; Formats: LP, MC	5	—	6	1	—	UK: Gold
The Second Album of the Very Best of Roger Whittaker	Released: May 1976; Label: EMI; Formats: LP, MC	27	—	—	3	—	UK: Silver
All My Best	Released: December 1976; Label: Tee Vee; Formats: LP, 2xLP, 8-track; Released in the US	—	—	—	—	—	CAN: Platinum
The Best of Roger Whittaker	Released: April 1977; Label: RCA; Formats: LP, MC, 8-track; Released in the US	—	—	—	—	—	CAN: Platinum; US: Gold
20 All Time Greats	Released: July 1979; Label: Polydor; Formats: LP, MC	24	—	—	—	—	UK: Gold
The Roger Whittaker Album	Released: January 1981; Label: K-tel; Formats: LP, MC	18	—	—	—	—	
Butterfly	Released: 1982; Label: Pickwick; Formats: LP	—	—	—	—	—	UK: Gold
His Finest Collection	Released: May 1987; Label: Tembo; Formats: CD, LP, MC	15	—	—	—	—	UK: Gold
Home Lovin' Man	Released: 11 September 1989; Label: Tembo; Formats: CD, LP, MC	20	—	—	—	—	UK: Silver
Celebration	Released: 7 September 1992; Label: Tembo/RCA; Formats: CD	—	—	—	—	—	CAN: Gold
A Perfect Day – His Greatest Hits & More	Released: April 1996; Label: RCA; Formats: CD, MC	74	4	—	—	—	
The Very Best of Roger Whittaker	Released: 27 May 1996; Label: Spectrum Music; Formats: CD; Also released as The World of Roger Whittaker	—	—	—	—	—	UK: Gold
Now & Then – Greatest Hits 1964–2004	Released: 26 January 2004; Label: BMG; Formats: CD	21	—	—	—	—	UK: Silver
The Golden Age of Roger Whittaker – 50 Years of Classic Hits	Released: 12 January 2009; Label: Universal; Formats: CD	11	—	6	1	—	UK: Gold
The Very Best Of	Released: 14 April 2014; Label: Spectrum Music; Formats: CD	—	—	—	—	—	
"—" denotes releases that did not chart or were not released in that territory.

==== Foreign compilation albums ====
Title	Album details	Peak chart positions										Certifications
Title	Album details	AUT	CAN	CAN (QUE)	DEN	FIN	GER	NL	NOR	NZ	SWI	Certifications
Attention!	Released: 1973; Label: Fontana; Formats: LP, MC; Released in Europe; Also released as If I Were a Rich Man	—	—	—	15	—	—	—	—	—	—	
Greatest Hits	Released: September 1975; Label: RCA; Formats: LP, MC, 8-track; Released in Canada	—	35	—	—	—	—	—	—	—	—	CAN: 5× Platinum
The Best of Roger Whittaker	Released: May 1976; Label: AVES; Formats: LP, MC; Released in Germany and Austria	3	—	—	—	—	1	—	—	—	—	GER: Gold
The Best of Roger Whittaker 2	Released: August 1976; Label: AVES; Formats: LP, MC; Released in Germany and Austria	—	—	—	—	—	12	—	—	—	—	GER: Gold
The Best of Roger Whittaker 3	Released: March 1977; Label: AVES; Formats: LP, MC; Released in Germany and Austria	15	—	—	—	—	19	—	—	—	—	
Seine 20 schönsten Lieder	Released: November 1978; Label: K-tel; Formats: LP, MC; Released in Germany, Austria and Switzerland	8	—	—	—	—	4	—	—	—	—	
The Best of Roger Whittaker	Released: 1979; Label: Philips; Formats: LP, MC; Released in Finland	—	—	—	—	21	—	—	—	—	—	
The Best of Roger Whittaker	Released: 1980; Label: Common Wealth; Formats: LP, MC; Released in the Netherlands	—	—	—	—	—	—	1	—	—	—	
Feelings	Released: 1981; Label: RCA; Formats: 2xLP, 2xMC; Released in Australasia	—	—	—	—	—	—	—	—	5	—	
Meine schönsten Lieder	Released: December 1981; Label: AVES; Formats: LP, MC; Released in Austria	5	—	—	—	—	—	—	—	—	—	
Hits	Released: September 1986; Label: Avon; Formats: CD, LP, MC; Released in Germany and Austria	23	—	—	—	—	4	—	—	—	—	GER: Platinum
Seine größten Erfolge	Released: July 1991; Label: Intercord; Formats: CD, LP, MC; Released in Germany and Austria	11	—	—	—	—	—	—	—	—	—	AUT: Gold
The Very Best Of	Released: 1991; Label: Philips; Formats: 2xCD, 2xLP, 2xMC; Released in Scandinavia	—	—	—	1	—	—	—	10	—	—	
24 Golden Hits	Released: March 1993; Label: Mercury; Formats: CD; Released in the Netherlands	—	—	—	—	—	—	8	—	—	—	
Goldene Erinnerungen	Released: 1993; Label: BMG; Formats: CD; Released in Germany and Austria	—	—	—	—	—	—	—	—	—	—	AUT: Gold
Das Beste von der Stimme des Herzens	Released: April 1994; Label: Ariola; Formats: 2xCD, 2xMC; Released in Germany and Austria	—	—	—	—	—	27	—	—	—	—	
Schön war die Zeit	Released: July 1994; Label: BMG; Formats: CD, MC; Released in Germany and Austria	—	—	—	—	—	—	—	—	—	—	AUT: Gold
Alles Roger!	Released: March 1996; Label: Ariola; Formats: CD, MC; Released in Germany and Austria	37	—	—	—	—	6	—	—	—	—	GER: Gold
Alles Roger 2	Released: April 1999; Label: Ariola; Formats: CD, MC; Released in Germany and Austria	—	—	—	—	—	89	—	—	—	—	
Største Hits	Released: 2000; Label: Universal; Formats: CD; Released in Norway	—	—	—	—	—	—	—	21	—	—	
From Roger Whittaker with Love	Released: January 2001; Label: BMG; Formats: 2xCD; Released in Denmark	—	—	—	4	—	—	—	—	—	—	DEN: Gold
Alles Roger 3	Released: March 2002; Label: Ariola; Formats: CD; Released in Germany and Austria	—	—	—	—	—	94	—	—	—	—	
Mon pays bleu – Les grands succès	Released: August 2002; Label: Tricycle; Formats: CD; Released in Canada	—	—	27	—	—	—	—	—	—	—	
Einfach leben -– Dankeschön für all die Jahre	Released: 17 March 2006; Label: Ariola/Sony Music; Formats: 2xCD; Released in Germany, Austria and Switzerland	8	—	—	—	—	16	—	—	—	72	GER: Platinum
The Danish Collection	Released: November 2007; Label: Universal; Formats: 2xCD; Released in Denmark	—	—	—	27	—	—	—	—	—	—	
Danke Deutschland – Meine größten Hits	Released: 25 March 2011; Label: Ariola/Sony Music; Formats: 2xCD; Released in Germany	—	—	—	—	—	46	—	—	—	—	
Alles Roger – Alles Hits	Released: 18 March 2016; Label: Sony Music; Formats: 2xCD; Released in Germany, Austria and Switzerland	—	—	—	—	—	—	—	—	—	—	
"—" denotes releases that did not chart or were not released in that territory.

=== Box sets ===
Title	Album details
The World of Roger Whittaker	Released: 1980; Label: RCA; Formats: 5xLP; Released in US
The Best of Roger Whittaker	Released: 1984; Label: Reader's Digest; Formats: 4xLP, 3xMC
The Best of Roger Whittaker	Released: 1987; Label: Reader's Digest; Formats: 5xLP; Released in the US and Canada
The Best of Roger Whittaker – 72 of His Greatest Hits	Released: 1987; Label: Reader's Digest; Formats: 6xLP; Released in Canada and Australia
Zeit für Gefühle	Released: 1993; Label: Reader's Digest; Formats: 4xMC; Released in Germany
Leben mit dir	Released: 2002; Label: Reader's Digest; Formats: 4xMC; Released in Germany
Original Album Classics	Released: 12 September 2014; Label: Ariola; Formats: 5xCD; Released in Germany
Mein Geschenk an Dich – Sein gesamtes deutsches Lebenswerk	Released: 14 October 2016; Label: Sony Music; Formats: 30xCD; Released in Germany
Original Album Classics Vol 2	Released: 16 March 2018; Label: Ariola; Formats: 5xCD; Released in Germany
Die grosse Dankeschön Edition	Released: 2018; Label: Sony Music; Formats: 10xCD; Released in Germany

== Singles ==
Title	Year	Peak chart positions									
Title	Year	UK	AUS	CAN	CAN AC	GER	IRE	NL	NZ	US	US AC
"The Charge of the Light Brigade"	1962	—	—	—	—	—	—	—	—	—	—
"Steel Men"	1962	— (Note: "Steel Men" did not enter the canonical Record Retailer Top 50, but did peak at number 29 on the New Musical Express Top 30.)	—	—	—	—	—	—	—	—	—
"Butterfly"	1962	—	—	—	—	—	—	—	—	—	—
"The Sinner"	1963	—	—	—	—	—	—	—	—	—	—
"Mud Puddle"	1964	—	—	—	—	—	—	—	—	—	—
"Jenny's Gone"	1964	—	—	—	—	—	—	—	—	—	—
"Chang-Alip"	1966	—	—	—	—	—	—	—	—	—	—
"Mexican Whistler"	1966	—	29	—	—	—	—	10	—	—	—
"If I Were a Rich Man" (Note: "If I Were a Rich Man" was only released as a single in the Netherlands, Belgium and Sweden.)	1967	—	—	—	—	—	—	4	—	—	—
"Handful of Dreams"	1967	—	—	—	—	—	—	—	—	—	—
"Little Shepherd" (Note: "Little Shepherd" was only released as a single in the Netherlands and Belgium.)	1967	—	—	—	—	—	—	—	—	—	—
"Early One Morning"	1968	—	—	—	—	—	—	—	—	—	—
"Talk to the Trees"	1968	—	—	—	—	—	—	—	—	—	—
"Emily"	1968	—	—	—	—	—	—	—	—	—	—
"Russian Whistler"	1968	—	—	—	—	—	—	—	—	—	—
"Mistral"	1969	—	—	—	—	—	—	—	—	—	—
"Durham Town (The Leavin')"	1969	12	80	—	—	—	17	—	—	—	—
"I Don't Believe in If Anymore"	1970	8	—	—	2	—	4	2	4	—	26
"New World in the Morning"	1970	17	85	—	—	—	1	24	17	—	12
"Why"	1971	47	—	88	2	—	—	—	—	—	40
"What Love Is"	1971	—	—	—	3	—	—	—	—	—	—
"Candy Cloud" (Note: "Candy Cloud" was only released as a single in Scandinavia and New Zealand.)	1971	—	—	—	—	—	—	—	—	—	—
"Mamy Blue"	1971	31	53	—	27	—	—	—	—	—	—
"I Dreamed a Dream"	1972	—	—	—	—	—	—	—	—	—	—
"Got to Head On Down the Road"	1973	—	—	—	—	—	—	—	—	—	—
"Hello Good Morning Happy Day"	1973	—	—	—	—	—	—	—	—	—	—
"Gone Away"	1973	—	—	—	—	—	—	—	—	—	—
"Every Time Is Going to Be the Last Time"	1974	—	—	—	—	—	—	—	—	—	—
"Image to My Mind" (Note: "Image to My Mind" was only released as a single in Norway.)	1974	—	—	—	—	—	—	—	—	—	—
"The Last Farewell"	1974	2	3	9	3	19	2	10	3	19	1
"Google Eye"	1975	—	—	—	—	—	—	—	—	—	—
"I Don't Believe in If Anymore" (re-release)	1975	—	50	—	8	—	—	—	—	—	10
"The First Hello, the Last Goodbye"	1975	54	100	—	16	—	—	—	26	—	16
"Durham Town (The Leavin')" (re-release) (Note: "Durham Town (The Leavin')" was re-released in the US and Canada in 1975.)	1975	—	—	—	8	—	—	—	—	—	23
"River Lady (A Little Goodbye)"	1976	—	—	—	—	4	—	—	31	—	—
"Summer Days"	1976	—	—	—	—	—	—	—	—	—	—
"Indian Lady" (Note: "Indian Lady" was only released as a single in Germany and Austria.)	1976	—	—	—	—	43	—	—	—	—	—
"Before She Breaks My Heart" (Note: "Before She Breaks My Heart" was only released as a single in the US, Canada, Scandinavia, the Netherlands and Australia.)	1976	—	—	—	—	—	—	—	—	—	39
"Canada Is" (Note: "Canada Is" was only released as a single in Canada.)	1977	—	—	—	—	—	—	—	—	—	—
"A Time for Peace"	1977	—	—	—	—	—	—	—	—	—	—
"From the People to the People" (Note: "From the People to the People" was only released as a single in Germany and Canada.)	1977	—	—	—	8	—	—	—	—	—	—
"Seagull"	1977	—	—	—	43	—	—	—	—	—	—
"The Last Song" (Note: "The Last Song" was only released as a single in Germany.)	1978	—	—	—	38	—	—	—	—	—	—
"If I Knew Just What to Say"	1978	—	—	—	—	—	—	—	—	—	47
"Everybody Is Looking for an Answer" (Note: "Everybody Is Looking for an Answer" was only released as a single in Germany.)	1978	—	—	—	—	—	—	—	—	—	—
"Calypso"	1978	—	—	—	—	—	—	—	—	—	—
"Imagine" (Note: "Imagine" was only released as a single in Canada.)	1978	—	—	—	—	—	—	—	—	—	—
"Call My Name"	1979	—	—	—	—	—	—	—	—	—	—
"Family"	1979	—	—	—	—	—	—	—	—	—	—
"You Are My Miracle"	1979	—	—	—	1	—	—	—	—	—	35
"Oh Life"	1980	—	—	—	—	—	—	—	—	—	—
"I Was Born" (Note: "I Was Born" was only released as a single in the US and Canada.)	1980	—	—	—	5	—	—	—	—	—	—
"I Am but a Small Voice" (Note: "I Am but a Small Voice" was only released as a single in the US, Canada, Germany and the Netherlands.)	1980	—	—	—	—	—	—	45	—	—	—
"Tall Dark Stranger"	1981	—	—	—	—	—	—	—	—	—	—
"How Does It Feel" (Note: "How Does It Feel" was only released as a single in the US and Canada.)	1981	—	—	—	—	—	—	—	—	—	—
"So Good, So Bad, So Soon"	1981	—	—	—	—	—	—	—	—	—	—
"Smooth Sailing" (Note: "Smooth Sailing" was only released as a single in the US.)	1981	—	—	—	—	—	—	—	—	—	—
"Changes"	1982	—	—	—	—	—	—	—	—	—	—
"Canada Is" (re-release)	1982	—	—	—	22	—	—	—	—	—	—
"Albany"	1982	—	—	—	13	—	—	—	—	—	—
"Too Beautiful to Cry" (Note: "Too Beautiful to Cry" was only released as a single in the US and Canada/)	1982	—	—	—	1	—	—	—	—	—	—
"Stranger on the Shore"	1983	95	—	—	4	—	—	—	—	—	—
"I Love You Because" (Note: "I Love You Because" was only released as a single in the US.)	1983	—	—	—	—	—	—	—	—	—	—
"I'm Back"	1983	—	—	—	—	—	—	—	—	—	—
"There Goes My Everything" (Note: "There Goes My Everything" was only released as a single in the US.)	1984	—	—	—	—	—	—	—	—	—	—
"Bitter and Sweet"	1984	145	—	—	15	—	—	—	—	—	—
"Take a Little – Give a Little"	1984	—	—	—	—	—	—	—	—	—	—
"Happy Everything"	1984	—	—	—	—	—	—	—	—	—	—
"My Silver Eagle" (Note: "My Silver Eagle" was only released as a single in the US.)	1985	—	—	—	—	—	—	—	—	—	—
"Gypsy"	1985	—	—	—	—	—	—	—	—	—	—
"The Genius of Love"	1986	137	—	—	13	—	—	—	—	—	—
"The Candle"	1986	—	—	—	—	—	—	—	—	—	—
"The Skye Boat Song" (with Des O'Connor)	1986	10	96	—	16	—	16	—	—	—	—
"Shenandoah" (with the Royal Philharmonic Orchestra)	1987	138	—	—	—	—	—	—	—	—	—
"Welcome Home"	1987	124	—	—	—	—	—	—	—	—	—
"Memory" (Note: "Memory" was only released as a single in Canada.)	1987	—	—	—	21	—	—	—	—	—	—
"The Twelfth of Never"	1987	—	—	—	—	—	—	—	—	—	—
"One More Chance"	1988	—	—	—	22	—	—	—	—	—	—
"I Love You"	1988	—	—	—	—	—	—	—	—	—	—
"Just Across the Rio Grande" (Note: "Just Across the Rio Grande" was only released as a single in the US and Canada.)	1989	—	—	—	—	—	—	—	—	—	—
"Where Good Love Goes"	1989	—	—	—	—	—	—	—	—	—	—
"Love Still Means You to Me" (Note: "Love Still Means You to Me" was only released as a single in the US and Canada.)	1989	—	—	—	25	—	—	—	—	—	—
"But She Loves Me"	1991	—	—	—	—	—	—	—	—	—	—
"Play Me a Song (To Make Me Smile)"	1992	198	—	—	—	—	—	—	—	—	—
"I Will Always Love You" (Note: "I Will Always Love You" was only released as a single in Europe.)	1994	—	—	—	—	—	—	—	—	—	—
"A Perfect Day" (with Jessica Whittaker)	1996	—	—	—	—	—	—	—	—	—	—
"Two Hundred Thousand Souls" (Note: "Two Hundred Thousand Souls" was only released as a single in Germany.)	2005	—	—	—	—	—	—	—	—	—	—
"—" denotes releases that did not chart or were not released in that territory.

=== French-language singles ===
Title	Year	Peak chart positions	
Title	Year	BE (WA)	CAN (QUE)
"Quel monde merveilleux" ("What a Wonderful World")	1968	38	—
"Plus haut sur la montagne"	1969	—	—
"Mon pays bleu" ("Durham Town")	1970	—	1
"Après la guerre (qu'on va gagner)" ("I Don't Believe in If Anymore")	1970	—	4
"Un éléphant sur mon balcon" ("Sugar My Tea")	1970	—	2
"L'oasis" ("Paradise")	1971	—	30
"Mammy Blue"	1971	—	1
"La colombe" ("I Believe")	1972	—	—
"La ballade de l'amour"	1972	—	4
"L'été est mort ce soir"	1972	—	14
"Une rose pour Isabelle"	1972	—	5
"Hello! Bonjour! Happy Day!"	1974	—	4
"Les yeux bleus"	1974	—	11
"Bonne nuit Maman"	1975	—	—
"Le dernier adieu" ("The Last Farewell")	1975	—	3
"Laisse-moi t'aimer"	1976	—	1
"Verse le vin Leita"	1977	—	18
"Isabelle & Caroline"	1978	—	27
"Tu es ma mélodie"	1981	—	13
"Le temps des amours"	1981	—	26
"—" denotes releases that did not chart or were not released in that territory.

=== German-language singles ===
Title	Year	Peak chart positions		
Title	Year	AUT	GER	SWI
"Was hat er dir denn getan" ("I Don't Believe in If Anymore")	1971	—	—	—
"Du warst mein schönster Traum" ("The Last Farewell")	1975	—	—	—
"Das alte Schiff" ("River Lady")	1976	—	—	—
"Indian Lady"	1976	—	—	—
"Guten Abend, gut' Nacht"	1976	—	—	—
"Zueinander-Miteinander" ("From the People to the People")	1977	—	—	—
"Jeder neue Morgen ist ein Abenteuer"	1979	—	—	—
"Goodbye ist Goodbye"	1979	—	—	—
"Calypso"	1980	—	—	—
"Kinder der ganzen Welt"	1980	—	—	—
"Albany"	1982	12	3	6
"Summer Sunshine City (Ein Paradies am Meer)"	1982	—	—	—
"Wenn es Dich noch gibt"	1983	5	14	—
"Tanz heut Nacht mit mir"	1983	—	45	—
"Abschied ist ein scharfes Schwert"	1984	4	9	23
"Eloisa"	1984	—	27	—
"Ich denk' oft an Mary"	1985	—	—	—
"Leben mit dir"	1985	27	28	—
"Fernweh"	1986	—	67	—
"Ein bißchen Aroma"	1986	—	55	—
"Paradies"	1987	—	—	—
"Laß mich bei dir sein"	1987	—	—	—
"Tango mit dir"	1988	—	—	—
"Aba Haidschi Bumbaidschi"	1988	—	—	—
"Du bist nicht allein"	1988	—	—	—
"Das Lied von Aragon"	1989	—	—	—
"Bleib heut bei mir" (with Cindy Berger)	1989	—	—	—
"Schön war die Zeit"	1990	—	—	—
"Was ist dabei, wenn wir zwei uns lieben"	1990	—	—	—
"7 Jahre, 7 Meere"	1991	—	—	—
"Doch tanzen will ich nur mit dir allein"	1991	—	—	—
"Sag' ihr"	1991	—	—	—
"Drei kleine Worte"	1991	—	—	—
"Du wirst alle Jahre schöner"	1992	—	58	—
"Tauch hinab in die Nacht"	1993	—	—	—
"Bring mir noch einmal die Jahre zurück"	1993	—	—	—
"Es soll so bleiben"	1994	—	—	—
"Die Sehnsucht nach Liebe"	1994	—	—	—
"Einfach leben"	1996	—	—	—
"Zurück zur Liebe"	1998	—	—	—
"—" denotes releases that did not chart or were not released in that territory.
