= From the North =

From the North may refer to:

== Music ==
- From the North (Raised Fist album)
- "From the North", song by Roger Whittaker from Celebration (Roger Whittaker album) 1993
- "From the North", song by Paul Mounsey and Runrig
