= Watch Your Step =

Watch Your Step may refer to:

== Albums ==
- Watch Your Step (Raised Fist album), 2001
- Watch Your Step (Ted Hawkins album) or the title song, 1982
- Watch Your Step, by Gonzalez, 1980

== Songs ==
- "Watch Your Step" (Bobby Parker song), 1961
- "Watch Your Step" (Elvis Costello song), 1981
- "Watch Your Step", by Disclosure from Energy, 2020

== Other uses ==
- Watch Your Step (film), a 1922 American silent comedy film
- Watch Your Step (musical), a 1914 Irving Berlin musical
