= Anthems (Raised Fist album) =

Studio album by Raised Fist
- Released: November 15, 2019
- Studio: Top Floor Studios, Oral Majority Recordings
- Genre: Hardcore punk, metalcore
- Length: 29:20
- Label: Epitaph
- Producer: Roberto Laghi, Jakob Herrmann

Raised Fist chronology
From the North (2015)	Anthems (2019)

Anthems is the seventh album by Swedish hardcore punk band Raised Fist, released on 15 November 2019.

== Track listing ==
No.	Title	Length
1.	"Venomous"	2:41
2.	"Seventh"	2:59
3.	"Anthem"	2:37
4.	"Murder"	2:39
5.	"Into This World"	3:33
6.	"Shadows"	2:44
7.	"Oblivious"	3:24
8.	"Polarized"	2:34
9.	"We Are Here"	2:47
10.	"Unsinkable II"	3:22
Total length:		29:20

== Charts ==
Chart (2019)	Peak position
Sweden Albums Top 60 (Sverigetopplistan)	13
Finnish Charts	19

== Credits ==
Raised Fist

- Alexander "Alle" Hagman – vocals
- Jimmy Tikkanen – guitar
- Daniel Holmberg – guitar
- Andreas "Josse" Johansson – bass
- Robert Wiiand – drums

Production

- Roberto Laghi – Producing, mixing
- Jakob Herrmann – Co-producing, engineering
