= Stronger Than Ever =

Stronger Than Ever may refer to:

== Albums ==
- Stronger Than Ever (album), by Grave Digger, or the title song, 1986
- Stronger Than Ever (EP), by Raised Fist, or the title song, 1996
- Stronger Than Ever, by Killer, 1983
- Stronger Than Ever, by Rose Royce, 1982

== Songs ==
- "Stronger Than Ever" (Raleigh Ritchie song), 2014
- "Stronger Than Ever", by Christina Aguilera from Bionic, 2010

== Other uses ==
- Stronger Than Ever, a Thoroughbred racehorse, winner of the 2018 Silverbulletday Stakes
