= I Don't Believe in If Anymore =

1970 single by Roger Whittaker

- Cover of the single released in the Netherlands

Single by Roger Whittaker

from the album I Don't Believe in If Anymore
- B-side: "Lullaby for My Love (Berceuse pour Mon Amour)"
- Released: 13 March 1970
- Genre: Pop
- Length: 3:18
- Label: Columbia; RCA Victor
- Songwriter: Roger Whittaker
- Producer: Denis Preston

Roger Whittaker singles chronology
"Durham Town (The Leavin')" (1969)	"I Don't Believe in If Anymore" (1970)	"New World in the Morning" (1970)

"I Don't Believe in If Anymore" is a song by British singer-songwriter Roger Whittaker, released as a single in March 1970. It peaked at number 8 on the UK Singles Chart. After the success of "The Last Farewell" in 1975, the song was re-released.

== Track listings ==
7": Columbia / DB 8664 (1970)

1. "I Don't Believe in If Anymore" – 3:18
2. "Lullaby for My Love (Berceuse pour Mon Amour)" – 2:36

7": RCA Victor / 74-0355 (1970, US & Canada)

1. "I Don't Believe in If Anymore" – 3:30
2. "I Should Have Taken My Time" – 2:55

7": RCA Victor / PB-10356 (1975, US & Canada)

1. "I Don't Believe in If Anymore" – 3:18
2. "New World in the Morning" – 2:26

7": EMI / EMI-10898 (1975, Australia)

1. "I Don't Believe in If Anymore" – 3:15
2. "Emily" – 3:30

== Charts ==
Chart (1970–71)	Peak position
Belgium (Ultratop 50 Flanders)	2
Belgium (Ultratop 50 Wallonia)	31
Canada Adult Contemporary (RPM)	2
Ireland (IRMA)	4
Netherlands (Dutch Top 40)	2
Netherlands (Single Top 100)	2
New Zealand (Listener)	4
South Africa (Springbok Radio)	2
UK Singles (Official Charts)	8
US Adult Contemporary (Billboard)	26

Chart (1975)	Peak position
Australia (Kent Music Report)	50
Canada Adult Contemporary (RPM)	8
US Adult Contemporary (Billboard)	10
