= Sweet Baby =

Sweet Baby may refer to:

- Sweet Baby (band)
- Sweet Baby J'ai
- "Sweet Baby" (George Duke & Stanley Clarke song), 1981
- "Sweet Baby" (Ted Hawkins song), 1982
- "Sweet Baby" (Macy Gray song), 2001
- "Sweet Baby" (Erreway song), 2002
- "Sweet Baby" (Scandal), the pilot episode of the television series Scandal
- "Sweet Baby", a song by Irving Berlin
- Sweet Baby Inc., a Canadian narrative development and consultation studio

== See also ==
- Sweet Baby James
