= McCabe's Guitar Shop =

Musical instrument store and live music venue in Santa Monica, California, USA

Coordinates: 34°1′33″N 118°27′27″W

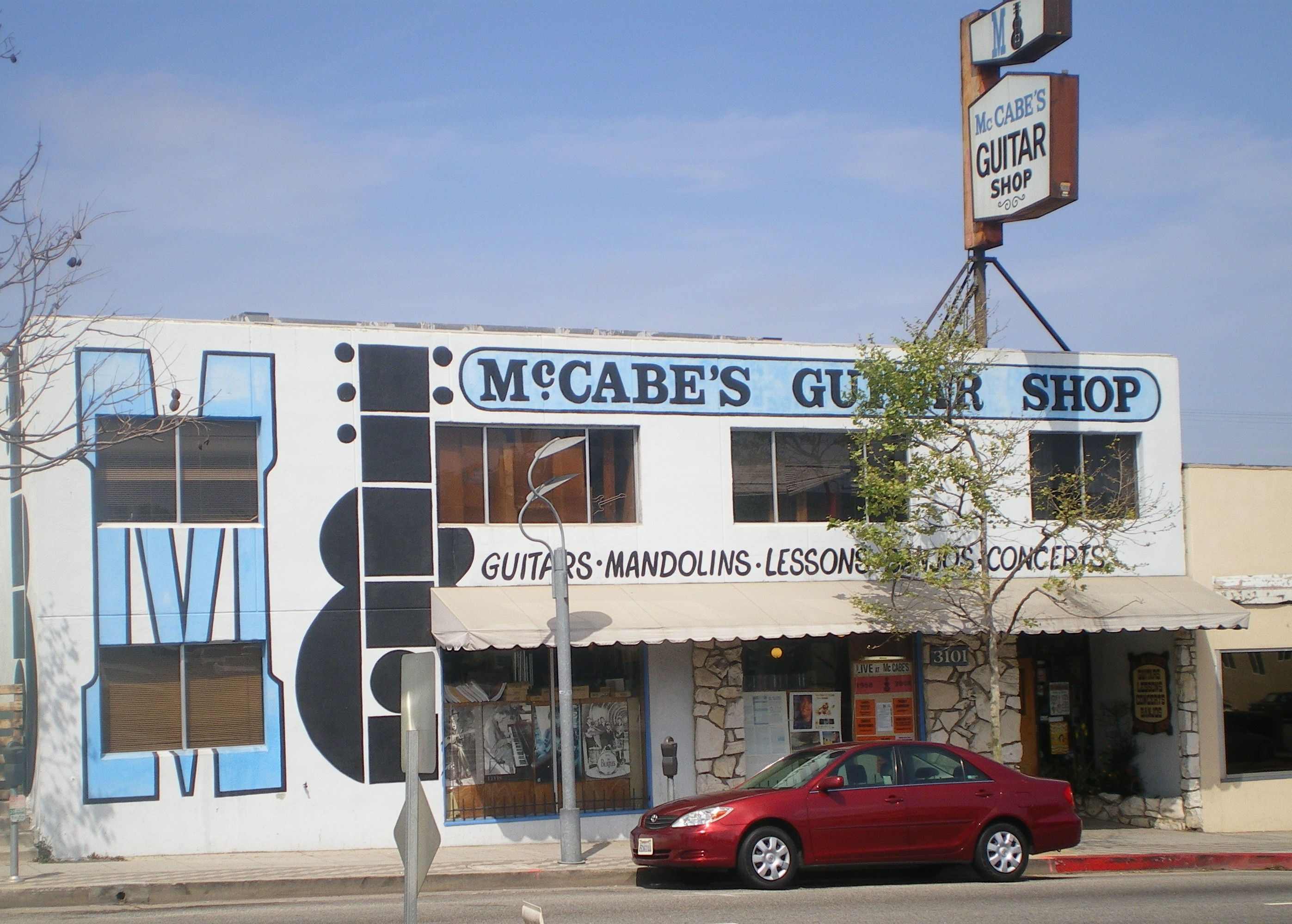
- The store in 2008
- Industry: Musical instruments
- Founded: 1958 (68 years ago)
- Founders: Gerald McCabe
- Headquarters: 3101 Pico Boulevard, Santa Monica, California, U.S.
- Website: https://www.mccabes.com

McCabe's Guitar Shop is a musical instrument store and live music venue on Pico Boulevard in Santa Monica, California, United States. Opened in 1958 by Gerald L. McCabe, a well-known furniture designer. McCabe's specializes in acoustic and folk instruments, including guitars, banjos, mandolins, dulcimers, fiddles, ukuleles, psaltries, bouzoukis, sitars, ouds, and ethnic percussion. Since 1969, McCabe's has also been a noted forum for folk concerts.

== Concerts at McCabe's ==
The decor at McCabe's is stripped down, with concerts being given in a back room with folding chairs and walls covered with vintage guitars, banjos, ukuleles and other instruments. A poll by Los Angeles Magazine in 2008 ranked McCabe's as one of the 32 greatest things about Los Angeles, with McCabe's defeating the Hollywood Bowl in a direct face-off. In The Guide prepared by the Los Angeles Times, McCabe's is described as "an achingly intimate room" with a "bare-bones setting" featuring "the best guitar music west of the 405 Freeway." The Guide continues: "Legends, traveling minstrels and local talent—they all seem to pass through McCabe's at some point. They may be there to get their guitars fixed; the club has a day job as one of the oldest stringed instrument stores in the city." Frommer's describes the McCabe's experience as "intimate in the extreme; the gig would have to be in your living room to get any cozier." The Metromix guide to Los Angeles calls McCabe's "a mild-mannered guitar/stringed instrument shop by day" that "opens up as a world-class concert venue by night." At full capacity the concert room holds 150.

The first concert was held in 1969, a benefit concert to help Elizabeth Cotton with travel fare to get her back home after a concert engagement elsewhere was cancelled, leaving her stranded in the area. That first concert was organized by Mike Seeger and the line-up featured Bryndle, Karla Bonoff, Andrew Gold, and Kenny Edwards. The opening act was Jackson Browne.

McCabe's is owned by Robert and Esperanza Riskin. Robert is the son of actress Fay Wray and screenwriter Robert Riskin ("It Happened One Night"). The Riskins retired from running the store in 2020, citing COVID. McCabe's Guitar Shop is now run by the Riskins' daughter Nora McGraw and her husband Walt McGraw. Concerts returned to McCabe's in 2022 after the COVID hiatus.

== Live at McCabe's: Live albums recorded at McCabe's ==
In the mid-1970s Takoma Records had offices two doors east of McCabe's and built a recording studio, with audio and video cables going from the sound booth at McCabes to the control room of the studio, which allowed easy recording of concerts. These master live recordings now reside within the McCabe's Guitar Shop Collection at the University of North Carolina at Chapel Hill's Southern Folklife Collection. Numerous artists have also recorded live albums at McCabe's (some of which were recorded using Takoma Studios from the mid-1970s to early 1980s) including:

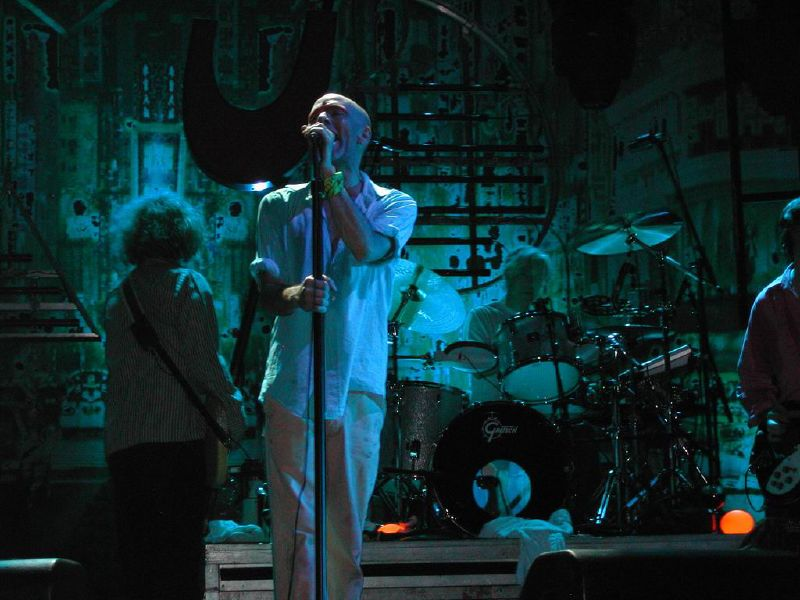
R.E.M.

- Norman Blake: Live at McCabe's released in 1976
- Mike Bloomfield: I'm With You Always recorded in 1977 (Benchmark Recordings)
- Byron Berline: Live at McCabe's released in 1978
- Maria Muldaur: Gospel Nights (with the Chambers Brothers) (1980, Takoma Records)
- Ted Hawkins: The Final Tour (1998, Evidence Music)
- Townes Van Zandt: Live at McCabe's recorded in 1995
- Ralph Stanley: Live at McCabe's Guitar Shop 2-11-01
- Tom Paxton: Live at McCabe's Guitar Shop recorded in 1991
- Henry Rollins: Live at McCabe's recorded June 1990
- Robin Williamson: Merry Band's Farewell Concert at McCabe's recorded in 1979
- Nancy Wilson (from Heart): Live at McCabe's Guitar Shop released in 1999
- Freedy Johnston: Live at McCabe's Guitar Shop released in 1998

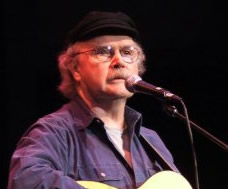
Tom Paxton

- John Stewart: Deep in the Neon: Live at McCabe's released in 1991
- Chris Smither: Chris Smither Live at McCabe's Guitar Shop 3/14/03
- David Hatfield: David Hatfield Live at McCabe's released in 2003
- Lyle Ritz & Herb Ohta: A Night of Ukulele Jazz Live at McCabe's recorded in 2000
- Paul Siebel: Live at McCabe's released in 1981
- Batdorf & Rodney: Live at McCabe's 1975
- Gene Clark & Carla Olson: Silhouetted In Light recorded February 3, 1990 (Demon Records)
- John P. Hammond: John Hammond Live released in 1983 (Rounder Records)

Pianist George Winston recorded a song, "Blues in G," at McCabe's in 1975. It was later released as a bonus track of the expanded edition of his first album, Piano Solos.

A bootleg recording was also made of R.E.M.: Live at McCabe's Guitar Shop in 1987, some of which have appeared as legitimate B-sides.

Bruce Springsteen joined John Wesley Harding onstage at a show to help sing Springsteen's "Wreck on the Highway," which later turned up on a Harding release.

Numerous audience tapes circulate of McCabe's performances, and several soundboards, including a set by T Bone Burnett in December 1993 that featured the Williams Brothers, Maria McKee and a cover of Dolly Parton's "I Will Always Love You." It also featured "My Life and the Women Who Lived It." Days later, Burnett performed at Rockpalast in Europe and claimed that "My Life and..." was written on the flight to Europe. That was clearly not true.

John Hiatt sang many of his songs from Bring the Family at several McCabe's shows just prior to recording that album. Those songs included "Memphis in the Meantime," "Your Dad Did" and "Lipstick Sunset," among others. McCabe's booker at the time, John Chelew, produced Bring the Family, which was recorded in four days and became Hiatt's best-known album.

== Gerald McCabe ==
Gerald McCabe was born in Long Beach, California, in 1927. He graduated from Long Beach Polytechnic High School, and served in the U.S. Navy during World War II. He studied at UCLA, earning a bachelor's degree, then at Cal State Long Beach, where he earned a master's.

McCabe established his guitar shop in 1958. After deciding to focus on furniture design, he sold the business in 1986.

He was diagnosed with Alzheimer's disease in 2004, shortly after which he moved to Eugene, Oregon, to be nearer his daughters. He married four times, each ending in divorce.

McCabe died in 2010, aged 82, after suffering a cardiac arrest.
