= If You Love Me =

If You Love Me may refer to:

== Albums ==
- If You Love Me, by Dorothy Squires, 2008
- If You Love me, by Nana Mouskouri, 1974
- If You Love Me by Richard Galliano, 2007
- If You Love Me / Si tu m'ami: 18th-Century Italian Songs by Cecilia Bartoli and György Fischer, 1992

== Songs ==
- "If You Love Me (Really Love Me)", the English language version of the Édith Piaf song "Hymne à l'amour"
- "If You Love Me" (Brownstone song), 1994
- "If You Love Me" (Lizzo song), 2022
- "If You Love Me" (Mint Condition song), 1999
- "If You Love Me" (Ted Hawkins song), 1992
- "If You Love Me", 2012 single by Lil' Kim
- "If You Love Me", 1982 single by Ron François
- "If You Love Me", 2022 song by Stan Walker from All In
- "If You Love Me (Let Me Know)", 1974 single by Olivia Newton-John
- "If You Love Me?", a 2007 song by Mary J. Blige from Growing Pains

== See also ==
- If Ye Love Me, a four-part motet or anthem by Thomas Tallis, first published in 1565
- If You Really Love Me, a 1971 song by Stevie Wonder
