= Just Say Noël =

Compilation album by various artists
- Released: October 29, 1996
- Genre: Christmas music
- Label: Geffen

Professional ratings
Review scores
Source	Rating
Allmusic	2.5/5 stars
Village Voice	(choice cut)

Just Say Noël is a Christmas compilation album on Geffen Records. It includes cover songs ("Santa Doesn't Cop Out On Dope" and "Millie Pulled a Pistol On Santa") as well as traditional Christmas songs (e.g. "Amazing Grace"). A new recording of "Christmas Is Quiet" by the Wild Colonials was released as a digital only single in late 2008.

== Track listing ==
1. "The Little Drum Machine Boy" – Beck
2. "Christmastime" – Aimee Mann with Michael Penn
3. "Santa Doesn't Cop Out On Dope" – Sonic Youth
4. "Christmas" – The Posies
5. "Millie Pulled A Pistol On Santa" – The Roots
6. "Merry Christmas Baby" – Southern Culture on the Skids
7. "Christmas" – Remy Zero
8. "Gloria" – Elastica
9. "Christmas Is Quiet" – Wild Colonials
10. "Thanks For Christmas" – XTC
11. "The Closing Of The Year" – The Musical Cast Of Toys featuring Wendy and Lisa
12. "Amazing Grace" – Ted Hawkins
