= Sound of the Republic =

Studio album by Raised Fist
- Released: April 10, 2006
- Genre: Hardcore punk, metalcore
- Length: 37:17
- Label: Burning Heart Records

Raised Fist chronology
Dedication (2002)	Sound of the Republic (2006)	Veil of Ignorance (2009)

Sound of the Republic is the fourth studio album by Swedish hardcore punk band Raised Fist.

== Track listing ==
1. You Ignore Them All – 3:32
2. Perfectly Broken – 3:11
3. Sunlight – 3:01
4. Sound of the Republic – 2:52
5. Killing It – 3:27
6. Back – 2:35
7. Hertz Island Escapades – 2:40
8. Some of These Times – 3:36
9. Nation of Incomplete – 2:23
10. And Then They Run – 3:38
11. Bleed Under My Pen – 2:27
12. Time Will Let You Go; All Alone, I Break – 3:55

=== Previously-Unreleased Version of Time Will Let You Go ===
A rare, early version of Time Will Let You Go was released on the second disc of Burning Heart's Heartattack Vol. 1 Compilation. In contrast to the hard rock version heard on Sound of the Republic, the Heartattack version is a tekno-metal-hardcore version which is much more listener-friendly than the version found on Sound of the Republic. The Heartattack version also is part of a collection of demo recordings which secured Raised Fist a recording contract. The Heartattack version is listed on the CD packaging and disc art as simply Time Will Let You Go instead of Time Will Let You Go; All Alone, I Break as seen on Sound of the Republic.

== Musicians ==
- Marco Eronen – guitar
- Daniel Holmberg – guitar
- Matte Modin – drums
- Andreas "Josse" Johansson – bass
- Alexander "Alle" Hagman – vocals
