= You're Not Like Me =

EP by Raised Fist
- Released: June 6, 1994
- Genre: Hardcore, Punk
- Length: 13:39
- Label: Burning Heart Records

Raised Fist chronology
You're Not Like Me (1994)	Stronger Than Ever (1996)

"You're Not Like Me" is the debut EP by the Swedish hardcore punk band Raised Fist, released on June 6, 1994, through Burning Heart Records.

== Track listing ==
1. Too Late to Change 1:57
2. Respect 2:00
3. To Make Up My Mind 1:25
4. Give Yourself a Chance 2:09
5. Break Free 2:50
6. Stand Up and Fight 3:16

== Musicians ==
- Petri "Pecka" Rönnberg - Guitar
- "Peson" - Guitar
- Peter "Pita" Karlsson – Drums
- Andreas "Josse" Johansson - Bass
- Alexander "Alle" Hagman - Vocals
