= Nick Shaw =

Nick Shaw is an independent film maker and background artist.

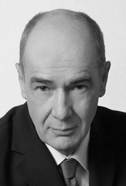
Nick Shaw 2008

He is known for his direction, writing and Film editing of the independent, fair trade film, Bananas Unpeeled, highlighting the plight of plantation workers in Central America and the Caribbean, with an introduction by political activist and comedian, Mark Thomas.

In 1988, he was commissioned by the Arts Council of England to produce a feature documentary on the singer-songwriter, Ted Hawkins. Although the documentary was never released, some of the footage appears in the 1996 film Ted Hawkins: Amazing Grace.

Recently he has worked on Dean Spanley, Princess Ka'iulani, Malice in Wonderland, and Series III of Kingdom. In 2010 he worked on Hugo for Martin Scorsese. Filming in 3D at Shepperton Studios took over six months to complete, and will be released in December 2011. Also in 2010 he appears in the Ealing Film Studios comedy Burke and Hare, as a barman for director John Landis.

He has worked for various NGO's. Both with Greenpeace during the farm trial evaluations of genetically modified crops, and with Christian Aid, gathering testimonial evidence to complaints from the local diocese in Central America.

Earlier in his life, he was a freelance stills photographer, commissioned on board various Soviet cruise ships, including MS Azerbaihzan and SS Maxim Gorkiy. He later worked in New York City as a freelance stills photographer.
