= From the North (Raised Fist album) =

Studio album by Raised Fist
- Released: January 19, 2015
- Recorded: 7 April – July 2014
- Genre: Hardcore punk, metalcore, crust punk
- Length: 32:18
- Label: Epitaph
- Producer: Roberto Laghi, Jakob Herrmann

Raised Fist chronology
Veil of Ignorance (2009)	From the North (2015)	Anthems (2019)

From the North is the sixth album by Swedish hardcore punk band Raised Fist, released on January 19, 2015.

== Track listing ==
No.	Title	Length
1.	"Flow"	2:57
2.	"Chaos"	2:38
3.	"Man & Earth"	3:52
4.	"In Circles"	2:43
5.	"We Will Live Forever"	3:13
6.	"Sanctions"	2:18
7.	"Ready to Defy"	3:23
8.	"Depression"	3:06
9.	"Gates"	2:11
10.	"Until the End"	2:57
11.	"Unsinkable"	3:00
Total length:		32:18

== Charts ==
Chart (2015)	Peak position
Australian Albums (ARIA)	93
Finnish Charts	14

== Credits ==
Raised Fist

- Alexander "Alle" Hagman – vocals
- Jimmy Tikkanen – guitar
- Daniel Holmberg – guitar
- Andreas "Josse" Johansson – bass
- Matte Modin – drums

Production

- Roberto Laghi – Producing, mixing
- Jakob Herrmann – Co-producing, engineering
