= The Next Hundred Years =

Studio album by Ted Hawkins
- Released: March 29, 1994
- Recorded: 1994
- Studio: Zeitgeist, Los Angeles; additional recording at The Complex, Los Angeles
- Genre: Soul blues
- Length: 36:06
- Label: DGC
- Producer: Tony Berg

Ted Hawkins chronology
I Love You Too (1989)	The Next Hundred Years (1994)	Songs from Venice Beach (1995)

The Next Hundred Years is a 1994 album by Ted Hawkins. It was the last album released during Hawkins's lifetime.

== Critical reception ==
Professional ratings
Review scores
Source	Rating
AllMusic	2.5/5 stars
Robert Christgau	(1-star Honorable Mention)
The Encyclopedia of Popular Music	3/5 stars

AllMusic reviewer Bill Dahl called the album "a far weaker outing than what came before, largely due to a plodding band unwisely inserted behind Hawkins that tends to distract rather than enhance his impassioned vocals and rich acoustic guitar strumming." The Los Angeles Times called The Next Hundred Years "an album of strange and wonderful beauty." The Washington Post listed it as one of 1994's best albums.

== Track listing ==
All tracks composed by Ted Hawkins; except where indicated

1. "Strange Conversation"
2. "Big Things"
3. "There Stands the Glass" (Russ Hall, Mary Jean Shurtz, Michael Pierce)
4. "Biloxi" (Jesse Winchester)
5. "Groovy Little Things"
6. "The Good and the Bad"
7. "Afraid"
8. "Green-Eyed Girl"
9. "Ladder of Success"
10. "Long as I Can See the Light" (John Fogerty)

== Personnel ==
- Ted Hawkins – guitar, vocals

Additional musicians

- Chris Bruce – guitar
- Tony Berg – keyboards, guitar
- Jim Keltner – drums, percussion
- Greg Leisz – steel guitar
- Pat Mastelotto – drums, percussion
- Kevin McCormick – bass guitar
- Bill Payne – keyboards
- John Pierce – bass guitar
- Guy Pratt – bass guitar
- Martin Tillman – cello
- Patrick Warren – keyboards
- Greg Wells – drums, percussion

Technical personnel

- Tony Berg – production
- Bob Ludwig – mastering at Gateway Mastering, Portland, Maine, United States
- Pat McCarthy – mixing
- John Paterno – recording
- Susan Rogers – recording

Artwork

- Jeff Sedlik – photography
- Robin Sloane – creative direction
- Janet Wolsborn – art direction

== Chart positions ==
Chart (1994)	Peak position
Australian Albums (ARIA)	20
