= Bananas Unpeeled =

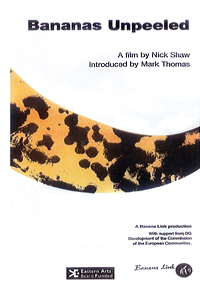
- Directed by: Nick Shaw
- Starring: Mark Thomas
- Release date: 13 December 2000 (UK)
- Running time: 26 minutes
- Budget: £50,000 (estimated)

Bananas Unpeeled is a 26-minute film shot in Latin America and the Caribbean, investigating the social and environmental issues faced by plantation workers and small farmers in the Caribbean. It examines fair trade policies and labeling as a positive alternative for workers on plantations where harsh working conditions and environmental damage are the norm.

The film was made by independent film-maker Nick Shaw and introduced by the political activist and comedian Mark Thomas.

This educational resource (the film and corresponding teacher action booklet) was quickly taken up by leading British NGO's (OXFAM, People & Planet). Used extensively by schools, universities, trade union organisations, etc., it helped with the introduction of the "fair trade banana" into Great Britain. The Co-Op UK supermarket chain was the first to introduce Fair trade Bananas into their stores. To date, several other supermarket chains have followed this example (e.g. Waitrose, Sainsbury's).

The story behind the making of the film is mentioned in the 2008 book Fighting the Banana Wars and other Fairtrade Battles by Harriet Lamb, C.B.E., director of the Fairtrade Foundation (UK).
