= Veil of Ignorance (album) =

Studio album by Raised Fist
- Released: September 7, 2009
- Recorded: 13 April – 26 May 2009
- Genre: Hardcore punk
- Length: 41:40
- Label: Burning Heart
- Producer: Daniel Bergstrand, Raised Fist, Örjan Örnkloo, Erik Sjölander

Raised Fist chronology
Sound of the Republic (2006)	Veil of Ignorance (2009)	From the North (2015)

Veil of Ignorance is the fifth studio album by Swedish hardcore punk band, Raised Fist. It was released in September 2009 on Burning Heart Records. In December 2012, The Pirate Bay featured the music video for "Friends and Traitors" on its website.

== Track listing ==
- All songs written by Raised Fist
1. "Friends and Traitors" – 3:13
2. "They Can't Keep Us Down" – 2:09
3. "Wounds" – 2:59
4. "Afraid" – 2:10
5. "Slipping Into Coma" – 2:39
6. "City of Cold" – 3:13
7. "Volcano Is Me" – 3:39
8. "Disbelief" – 2:41
9. "My Last Day" – 3:00
10. "I Have to Pretend" – 2:38
11. "Words and Phrases" – 4:24
12. "Keeping It to Yourself" – 1:36
13. "Never Negotiate" – 3:11
14. "Out" – 4:01

== Charts ==
Chart (2009)	Peak position
Finnish Albums Chart	29
Swedish Albums Chart	22

== Credits ==
- Alexander "Alle" Hagman – vocals
- Marco Eronen – guitar
- Daniel Holmberg – guitar
- Andreas "Josse" Johansson – bass
- Matte Modin – drums
- Produced by Daniel Bergstrand, Raised Fist, Örjan Örnkloo, and Erik Sjölander
- Recorded at Studio DugOut and Misty Studios between 13 April and 26 May 2009
