= Durham Town (The Leavin') =

1969 song

Single by Roger Whittaker

from the album This is...Roger Whittaker
- B-side: "Storm"
- Released: October 1969
- Genre: Vocal pop Contemporary folk
- Length: 3:08
- Label: Columbia (UK); RCA Victor (US)
- Songwriter: Roger Whittaker
- Producer: Denis Preston

Roger Whittaker singles chronology
"Mistral" (1969)	"Durham Town (The Leavin')" (1969)	"I Don't Believe in If Anymore" (1970)

"Durham Town (The Leavin')" is a song, written and sung by Roger Whittaker, released as a single in 1969. It spent 18 weeks on the UK Singles Chart, peaking at No. 12. In 1976, the song reached No. 8 on Canada's RPM "Pop Music Playlist", while reaching No. 23 on Billboard's Easy Listening chart. The song was also recorded in French translation under the title "Mon pays bleu".

== Background ==
Whittaker's original intent, to set the song in Newcastle, was abandoned in favour of nearby Durham because Whittaker agreed with his producer that "Durham" sounded better. While focusing the song on Newcastle, Whittaker had set its second verse "on the banks of the river Tyne", and as Whittaker had little to no familiarity with his chosen locale for the song, he retained the verse with its Tyneside setting for the song's finalized version set in Durham. While the Tyne flows eastwards through Newcastle, it is the Wear, 20 miles (32 km) to the south, which flows through Durham.

== Releases ==
Under its original title "The Leaver", the song first appeared on Whittaker's 1969 album release This is...Roger Whittaker, recorded with producer Denis Preston at Preston's studio in Lansdowne House. The track—renamed "Durham Town (The Leavin')"—was issued as a single in October 1969. Whittaker later recalled: "I just didn't have any faith in that song at all. Far from promoting the single in Britain, I went off to Finland for a cabaret season and television appearances."

Whittaker returned to Britain in November to find the song ascending the UK Singles Chart towards a No. 12 peak in January 1970. On the Irish Singles Chart it was afforded a chart peak of No. 17. In Australia, the single—titled "The Leavin' (Durham Town)"—attracted enough regional success to chart nationally at No. 80.

In 1970, the song was included on the North American RCA Victor release of Whittaker's album New World in the Morning, whose title cut was coupled with "Durham Town" to form Whittaker's first US single. Whittaker recorded a French rendering of the song for the French and Canadian markets, entitled "Mon Pays Bleu (Durham Town)".

The wake of the success Whittaker enjoyed with "The Last Farewell" in the summer of 1975 resulted in the reissue of "Durham Town" in the US and Canada, where the track became an Easy Listening hit. The song was also included on the album The Last Farewell & Other Hits, issued by RCA Victor in 1975.

== Cover versions ==
The song has also been recorded by Anne and Laura Brand on the 1970 album The Pride O' The North, by Val Doonican as "Leaving (Durham Town)" on the 1971 album Just A Sittin' And A Rockin' , and by Finnish singer Robin as "Jäähyväiset" (1970).

In 2016, the French version ("Mon pays bleu") was recorded and released as a single by the Canadian singer Natasha St-Pier. The cover appeared as the title track of a tribute album to Whittaker produced by the Quebec singer Mario Pelchat, and was also released as a single.

== Chart performance ==
Chart (1969–1970)	Peak position
Ireland (IRMA)	17
UK Singles Chart	12

Chart (1976)	Peak position
Canada - RPM Pop Music Playlist	8
US - Billboard Easy Listening	23
