= Live at McCabe's (Townes Van Zandt album) =

Live album by Townes Van Zandt
- Released: November 27, 2001
- Recorded: February 10, 1995
- Label: Return to Sender
- Producer: Townes Van Zandt

Townes Van Zandt chronology
Texas Rain: The Texas Hill Country Recordings (2001)	Live at McCabe's (2001)	A Gentle Evening with Townes Van Zandt (2002)

Professional ratings
Review scores
Source	Rating
Allmusic	3/5 stars

Live at McCabe's is a live album recorded by singer-songwriter Townes Van Zandt in 1995 and released in 2001. It was recorded at McCabe's Guitar Shop in Santa Monica, California and is a limited edition. Only 2000 copies were printed.

Van Zandt is joined on stage by slide guitarist Kelly Joe Phelps.

== Track listing ==
All songs written by Townes Van Zandt unless otherwise noted.

1. "The Hole" – 6:43
2. "Pueblo Waltz" – 3:41
3. "Pancho and Lefty" – 5:32
4. "Short Haired Woman Blues" (Lightnin' Hopkins) – 7:49
5. "Shrimp Song" (Roy C. Bennett, Sid Tepper) – 4:14
6. "Snowin' on Raton" – 7:20
7. "Katie Belle Blue" – 3:20
8. "Dollar Bill Blues" – 3:37
9. "A Song For" – 5:30
10. "Banks of the Ohio" (Traditional) – 5:25
11. "Wabash Cannonball" (Traditional) – 4:47
12. "Marie" – 5:45

== Personnel ==
- Townes Van Zandt – vocals, guitar
- Kelly Joe Phelps – Dobro

== Production notes ==
- Produced by Townes Van Zandt
- Harold F. Eggers Jr. – executive producer
- Olaf Meyer – artwork
