= Happy Hour (Ted Hawkins album) =

Studio album by Ted Hawkins
- Released: 1986
- Studio: Music Lab, Los Angeles
- Genre: Blues
- Label: Windows on the World, Rounder
- Producer: Bruce Bromberg, Dennis Walker

Ted Hawkins chronology
Watch Your Step (1982)	Happy Hour (1986)	On the Boardwalk (The Venice Beach Tapes) (1986)

Professional ratings
Review scores
Source	Rating
AllMusic	4.5/5 stars
Christgau's Record Guide: The '80s	B
The Encyclopedia of Popular Music	3/5 stars
Tom Hull – on the Web	B+

Happy Hour is an album by Ted Hawkins. It was released in 1986.

== Critical reception ==
AllMusic wrote that "Hawkins blended soul and urban blues stylings with country and rural blues inflections and rhythms, making another first-rate release." Trouser Press praised Hawkins's "sturdy emotional delivery."

== Track listing ==
All tracks composed by Theodore Hawkins, Jnr.; except where indicated

1. "Bad Dog"
2. "Happy Hour" (Dave Mackechnie, Steve Gillette)
3. "Don't Make Me Explain It"
4. "The Constitution"
5. "My Last Goodbye"
6. "You Pushed My Head Away"
7. "Revenge of Scorpio"
8. "California Song"
9. "Cold & Bitter Tears"
10. "Gypsy Woman" (Curtis Mayfield)
11. "Ain't That Pretty"
12. "One Hundred Miles"

== Personnel ==
- Ted Hawkins – vocals, guitar
- Dale Wilson – lead guitar
- Augie Brown – guitar
- Dennis Walker – bass
- Johnny Greer – drums
- Elizabeth Hawkins – vocals
- Robert Cray as "Night Train Clemons" – guitar on "You Pushed My Head Away" and "Gypsy Woman"
