= Shinyribs =

US musical group

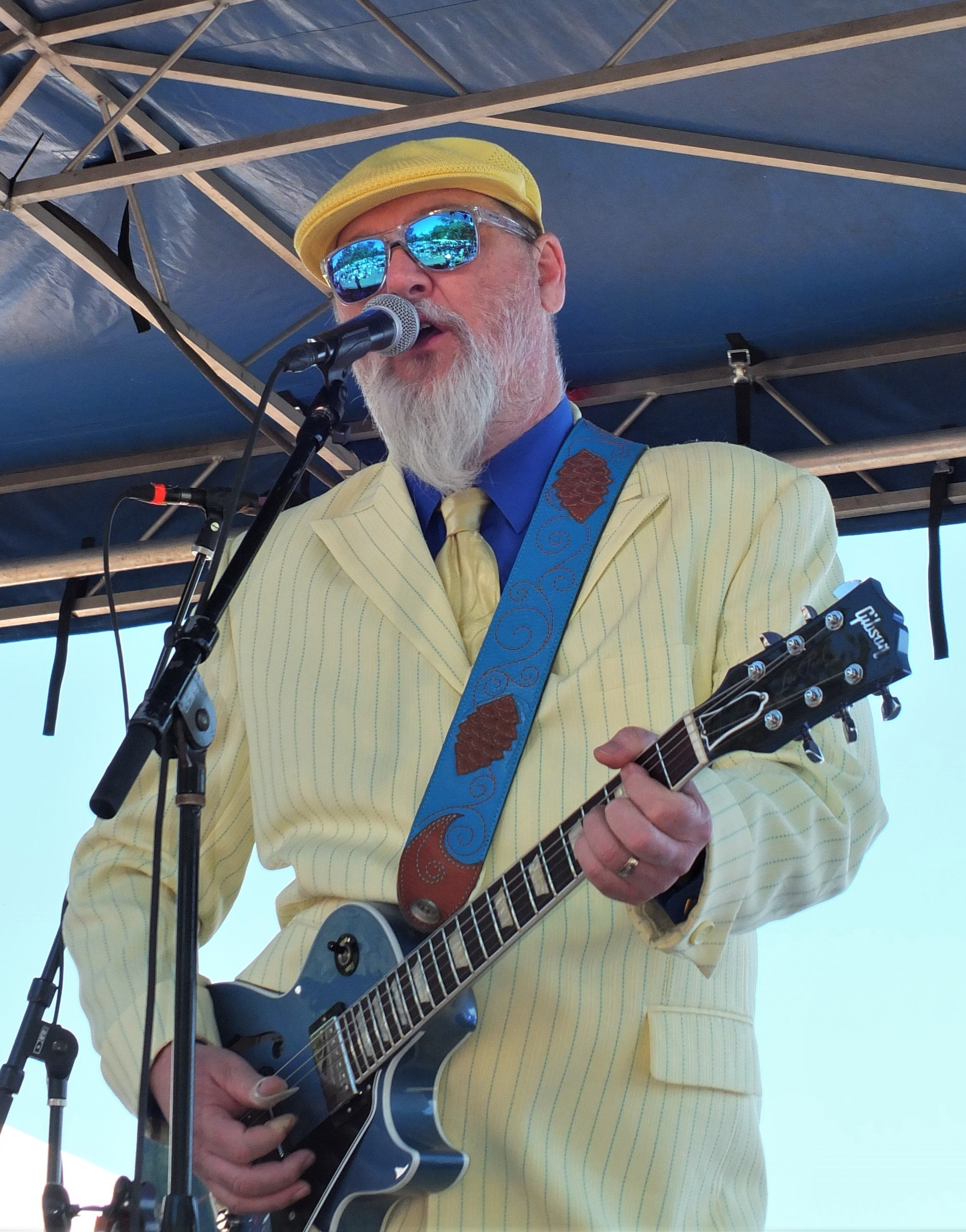
- Shinyribs at Old Settler's Music Festival. Photo - Ron Baker (2019)

Background information
- Origin: Austin, Texas, United States
- Genres: swamp funk, Southern soul
- Years active: 2007–present
- Labels: Mustard Lid Records, Nine Mile Records, Blue Élan Records
- Members: Kevin Russell; Keith Langford; Mason Hankamer; Eric Baker; Kellee Fuller; Schaefer Llana; Cat Clemons
- Past members: Daniel "Tiger" Anaya; Mark Wilson; Alice Spencer; Kelley Mickwee; Winfield Cheek; Jeff Brown; Marty Muse; Danny Levin; Jay Stiles; Courtney Santana; Sally Allen; Mike Stewart
- Website: Shinyribs.org

Shinyribs is a 7-piece swamp funk / Southern soul band from Austin, Texas.

== History ==
Shinyribs began in 2007 as a solo side project of singer/guitar player Kevin Russell, then of longtime Austin band The Gourds. At first "Shinyribs" referred to Russell personally in connection with his solo shows, but Russell later performed under the name "Shinyribs" in a band with other musicians, such as Gourds bandmate, drummer Keith Langford. "Shinyribs" then transitioned to be the name of the band as well. The name derives from something called out to Russell by a transient woman to whom he had previously given a plate of ribs.

After the Gourds went on hiatus in 2013, Shinyribs became Russell's and Langford's primary vehicle. By 2016, Shinyribs included bass guitar, keyboard, horns (Tijuana TrainWreck Horns), and backing singers (Shiny Soul Sisters).

Shinyribs' sound is a combination of many styles and influences. Russell calls it "country-soul" and "swamp-funk." The ultimate decisions on Shinyribs' musical direction are based on Russell's vision for the band. Live performances generally feature Russell dancing on stage or in a conga line extending through the venue.

"Shinyribs is flamboyant and has completely no rules.... He’s free and is dancing like no one’s watching. He’s all about love and having fun and celebrating life."

In addition to playing its original music, Shinyribs covers songs like "Waterfalls" (TLC), "Pony" (Ginuwine), "Buy U a Drank" (T-Pain), "All About That Bass" (Meghan Trainor), "Golden Years" (David Bowie), "I Gave Up All I Had and Sorry You're Sick" (Ted Hawkins), "Me and Paul" (Willie Nelson), "Hey Pocky A-Way" (The Meters), "The Wind Cries Mary" (Jimi Hendrix), "Heart of Stone" (The Rolling Stones), "No Diggity" (Blackstreet), and "Baby Don't You Do It" (Marvin Gaye/The Band).

Shinyribs' Kevin Russell produced Cold and Bitter Tears: The Songs of Ted Hawkins with Jenni Finlay and Brian T. Atkinson for Austin-based label Eight 30 Records. The album features Shinyribs ("Who Got My Natural Comb"), James McMurtry ("Big Things"), Kasey Chambers (the title track), and Mary Gauthier ("Sorry You're Sick").

== Members ==
- Kevin Russell - lead vocals, guitar, ukulele, mandolin
- Keith Langford - drums, percussion
- Mason Hankamer - bass guitar, upright bass, tuba
- Eric Baker - keyboards
- Kellee Fuller - backing vocals, percussion
- Schaefer Llana - backing vocals, percussion
- Cat Clemons - guitar, pedal steel

== Former members ==
- Daniel "Tiger" Anaya - trumpet
- Mark Wilson - tenor saxophone, baritone saxophone, flute
- Alice Spencer - backing vocals, percussion
- Kelley Mickwee - backing vocals, percussion
- Winfield Cheek - keyboards
- Jeff Brown - bass guitar
- Marty Muse - pedal steel, lap steel, dobro, bongos
- Danny Levin - violin
- Jay Stiles - keyboards, melodica
- Courtney Santana - backing vocals
- Mars Wright - backing vocals
- Sally Allen - backing vocals
- Mike Stewart - bass guitar, "skwanga"

== Discography ==
=== Shinyribs ===
- Well After Awhile – 2010
- Gulf Coast Museum – 2013
- Okra Candy – 2015
- I Got Your Medicine – 2017
- The Kringle Tingle – 2018
- Goin' Home B/W He Said If I Be Lifted Up (Need To Know) – 2019
- Fog & Bling – 2019
- Late Night TV Gold – 2021
- Transit Damage – 2023
- Leaving Time - 2025
- Real Alligator - 2026

=== Compilations ===
- Shinyribs: "Dollar Bill Blues", More Townes Van Zant by the Great Unknown – 2010
- Kevin Russell: "All the Time", While No One Was Looking: Toasting 20 Years of Bloodshot Records – 2014
- Shinyribs: "Bolshevik Sugarcane", Austin Music Vol. 13 – 2014
- Shinyribs: "Song of Lime Juice and Despair", Texas Music Scene: Live, Vol. 1 – 2015
- Shinyribs: "Who Got My Natural Comb", Cold and Bitter Tears: The Songs of Ted Hawkins – 2015

== Television ==
Shinyribs provided the theme song, "Our Game", for Lone Star Law, a series about game wardens within the Texas Parks and Wildlife Department, which premiered on Animal Planet on June 2, 2016.

== Awards ==
=== Austin Music Pundits Awards ===
Year	Work/artist	Award	Result
2010	Well After Awhile	Austin Album of the Year	7th place

=== Lone Star Music Awards ===
Year	Work/artist	Award	Result
2014	Gulf Coast Museum	Album of the Year	Nominated
2014	Gulf Coast Museum	Americana/Roots Rock Album of the Year	Nominated
2014	Shinyribs	Live Act of the Year	Nominated
2014	George Reiff	Producer of the Year	Nominated

=== Austin Music Awards ===
Year	Work/artist	Award	Result
2015	Shinyribs	Band of the Year	5th place
2015	Kevin Russell	Musician of the Year	4th place
2017	Shinyribs	Funk/Blues/Soul Band of the Year	1st place
2017	KevinRussell/Shinyribs	Musician of the Year	3rd place
2017	Shinyribs	Best Austin Band	2nd place
2017	Shinyribs	Best Rock Band	6th place
2017	Keith Langford	Best Drummer	5th place
2017	Winfield Cheek	Best Keyboard Player	6th place
2017	Kevin Russell	Best Male Vocalist	5th place
2017	Kevin Russell	Best Miscellaneous Instrumentalist (ukulele)	5th place
2017	Kevin Russell	Best Songwriter	5th place
