= The Final Tour =

Live album by Ted Hawkins
- Released: 1998
- Recorded: 1994
- Genre: Soul blues
- Length: 67:00
- Language: English
- Label: Evidence
- Producer: Jerry Gordon
- Compiler: Jerry Gordon

Ted Hawkins chronology
Love You Most of All – More Songs from Venice Beach (1998)	The Final Tour (1998)	The Ted Hawkins Story: Suffer No More (1998)

The Final Tour is a live album by American soul blues singer Ted Hawkins, released in 1998. The recordings capture Hawkins on his last concert tour in 1994, weeks before his death. The album received positive reviews.

== Recording ==
The first 16 tracks formed a set at McCabe's Guitar Shop in Santa Monica, California, on November 5, 1994. The next three songs formed a suite about Hawkins' life growing up in Mississippi, recorded on October 8, 1994, at The Pres House at the University of Wisconsin–Madison. Finally, "A Thing Called Love" was performed at Goochi's, in Wenatchee, Washington.

== Critical reception ==
Professional ratings
Review scores
Source	Rating
AllMusic	4.5/5 stars
Chicago Tribune	4/4 stars
Christgau's Consumer Guide	(1-star Honorable Mention)
Entertainment Weekly	A

Alex Henderson of AllMusic wrote that the album "shows how great Hawkins was sounding during the last months of his life" and called it magnificent. Robert Christgau gave the album an honorable mention.

== Track listing ==
All songs written by Ted Hawkins unless otherwise stated

1. Intro – 0:24 (a spoken-word introduction by Hawkins)
2. "There Stands the Glass" (Russ Hull, Webb Pierce, Mary Jean Shurtz) – 2:49
3. "Watch Your Step" – 2:44
4. "Strange Conversation" – 5:16
5. "Sorry You're Sick" – 2:18
6. "Bring It On Home Daddy" – 3:16
7. "Big Things" – 3:02
8. "Revenge of Scorpio" – 2:56
9. "Groovy Little Things" – 3:41
10. "Ladder of Success" – 3:13
11. "Part Time Love" (Clay Hammond) – 5:24
12. "I Got What I Wanted" (Brook Benton, Margie Singleton) – 3:07
13. "Bad Dog"" – 2:24
14. "The Good and the Bad" – 4:56
15. "All I Have to Offer You Is Me" (Dallas Frazier, A.L. Owens) – 4:23
16. "Long as I Can See the Light" (John Fogerty) – 2:44
17. "Biloxi" (Jesse Winchester) – 4:17
18. "The Lost Ones" – 3:16
19. "Missin' Mississippi" (Byron Gallimore, Alan Mevis, William Shore) – 3:57
20. "A Thing Called Love" (Jerry Reed) – 2:53

== Personnel ==
- Ted Hawkins – acoustic guitar, vocals
- Phil Garfinkel – engineering
- Jerry Gordon – production
- Wayne Griffith – engineering
- Bill Wasserzieher – liner notes
