= Dedication (Raised Fist album) =

Studio album by Raised Fist
- Released: October 21, 2002
- Recorded: June 1–30, 2002 at DugOut Studio
- Genre: Hardcore punk
- Length: 35:24
- Label: Burning Heart

Raised Fist chronology
Watch Your Step (2001)	Dedication (2002)	Sound of the Republic (2006)

Dedication is the third album by hardcore band Raised Fist.

== Track listing ==
1. Get This Right! 3:30
2. That's Why 1:37
3. Message Beneath Contempt 3:20
4. The People Behind 2:16
5. Disable Me 4:58
6. Killing Revenues 2:59
7. Illustration of Desperation 4:13
8. Dedication 3:54
9. Silence Is the Key 2:08
10. Another Day 3:23
11. Between the Demons 3:06

== Musicians ==
- Marco Eronen – guitar
- Daniel Holmberg – guitar
- Oskar Karlsson – drums
- Andreas "Josse" Johansson – bass
- Alexander "Alle" Hagman – vocals
- Gustav Jorde (Defleshed) – additional vocals on "Between the Demons"
- Örjan Örnkloo – additional guitars/samplings
