= Gerald McCabe =

American furniture designer (1927–2010)

- Born: January 30, 1927; Long Beach, California, U.S.
- Died: January 17, 2010 (aged 82); Springfield, Oregon, U.S.
- Occupation: Furniture designer
- Spouse(s): Marcia Berman (m. 1950–1958); Viki Selditch (m. 1960–1969); Christine Haber (divorced in 1973); Robin Calhoun
- Children: 2
- Website: www.mccabes.com

Gerald Lawrence McCabe (January 30, 1927 – January 17, 2010) was an American furniture designer. He also established McCabe's Guitar Shop, in Santa Monica, California, in 1958. As of 2026, it is still in operation.

== Early life ==
McCabe was born in 1927 in Long Beach, California, to Jesse Lawrence McCabe and Lena Cornelia Fallick. His mother was a native of the Isle of Wight. He had one sister, Janet.

He graduated from Long Beach Polytechnic High School, before serving in the United States Navy during World War II. After his service, McCabe, a dyslexic, gained a bachelor's degree at UCLA and a master's degree at Cal State Long Beach, both in fine arts.

== Career ==
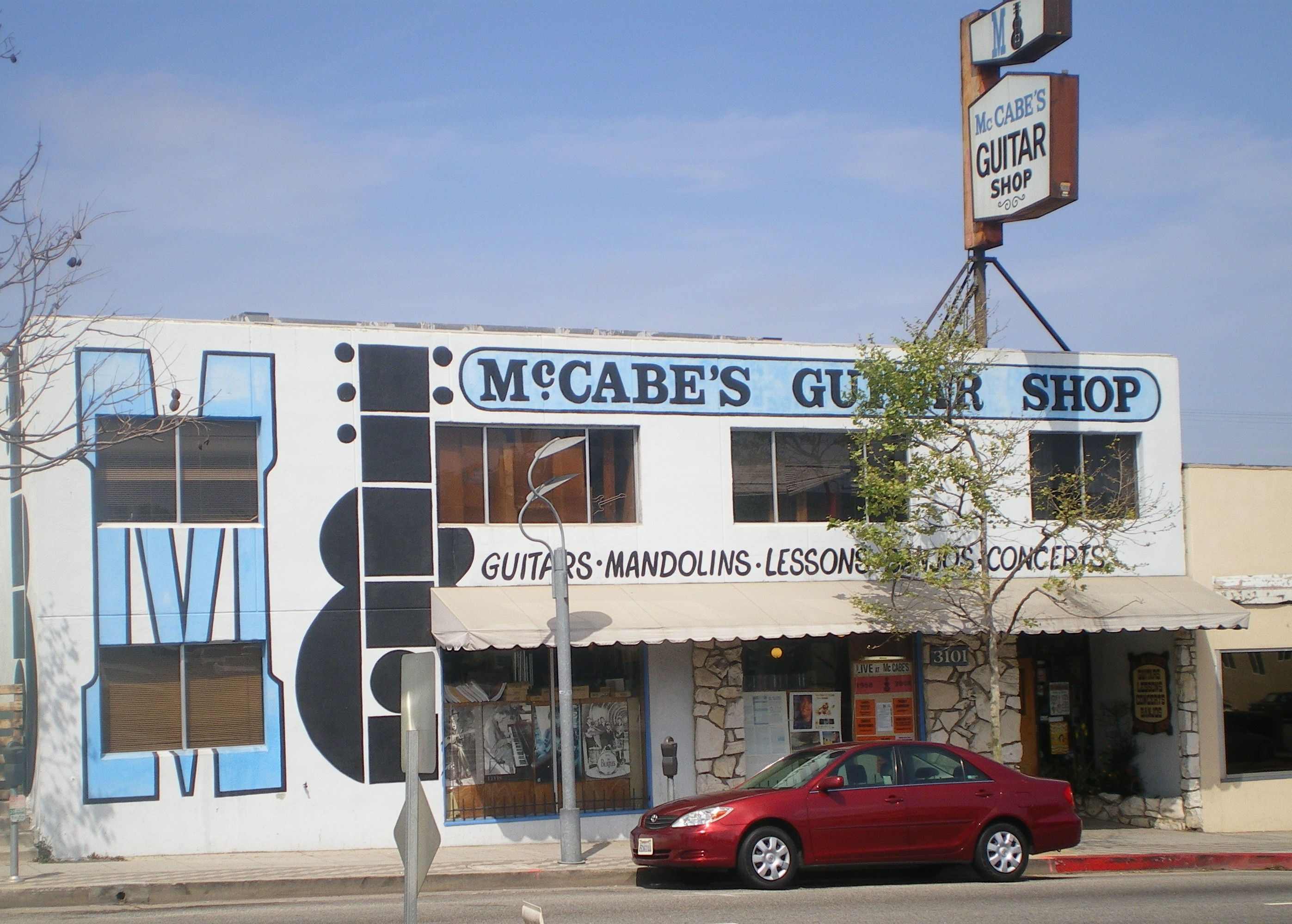
McCabe's Guitar Shop in 2008

In the early 1950s, McCabe opened a business selling customer furniture in Santa Monica, California. His first wife, Marcia, being a folk singer, brought her instrument to him for repair. Her friends did the same, and this led to him, in 1958, establishing McCabe's Guitar Shop on Pico Boulevard. The guitar shop became very successful, helping to evolve the folk-music landscape in Southern California, but McCabe wanted to focus on his furniture work, so in 1986 he sold his interest. As of 2026, the McCabe's is still in operation, a block west of its original spot.

McCabe also restored and sailed a tugboat, built a home in Santa Monica Canyon, taught design at universities and art schools in the Los Angeles area, became a yoga instructor and repaired Citroen cars.

== Personal life ==
In 1955, McCabe married Marcia Joan Berman, with whom he had a daughter. They divorced in 1958, a year after McCabe's father died. He married three more times (to Viki Selditch, Christine Haber and Robin Calhoun), each ending in divorce, and had another daughter.

McCabe's mother died in 1996, aged 96.

== Death ==
McCabe died in 2010, aged 82, two days after suffering a heart attack.
