= Songs from Venice Beach =

Compilation album by Ted Hawkins
- Released: 1995
- Recorded: 1985
- Genre: R&B, soul
- Label: Evidence
- Producer: H. Thorp Minister III

Ted Hawkins chronology
The Next Hundred Years (1994)	Songs from Venice Beach (1995)	Love You Most of All – More Songs from Venice Beach (1998)

Songs from Venice Beach is a compilation album by the American musician Ted Hawkins, released in 1995. It was the first collection of Hawkins's songs to be released after his death.

== Production ==
The album's songs were recorded in 1985 but released a decade later, after Hawkins's death. The sessions took place in Nashville, and were financed by H. Thorp Minister III; Minister had asked to record Hawkins after hearing him at Venice Beach. For years, Hawkins sold tapes of the recordings at his concerts. Albums of the recordings were also sold in Europe.

Songs from Venice Beach consists of 13 cover songs, with only one Hawkins original, "Ladder of Success".

== Critical reception ==
Professional ratings
Review scores
Source	Rating
AllMusic	4/5 stars
Calgary Herald	5/5 stars
The Encyclopedia of Popular Music	4/5 stars
The Indianapolis Star	4/4 stars
MusicHound R&B: The Essential Album Guide	4/5 stars
North County Times	A

The Edmonton Journal thought that "the material is almost beside the point because this is as gritty and soulful as blues roots music gets." The Calgary Herald declared that "the supreme soulfulness of Hawkins versions of everything from 'There Stands The Glass' and Cooke's 'Good Times' to Curtis Mayfield's 'Gypsy Woman' and Brook Benton's 'I Got What I Wanted' will bring tears of joy to your eyes." The Columbus Dispatch deemed the album "a profoundly graceful and moving collection." The Press-Enterprise opined that the compilation "captures the singer's astonishing gifts—think Sam Cooke at his fiercest—as well as anything he's ever done." The North County Times praised the "simple acoustic guitar strumming behind his crystal-clear vocals."

AllMusic wrote that Hawkins combined "every form of roots music imaginable into his own singular soulful stew."

== Track listing ==
No.	Title	Length
1.	"Searching for My Love"
2.	"I Got What I Wanted"
3.	"Ladder of Success"
4.	"Having a Party"
5.	"There Stands the Glass"
6.	"Quiet Place"
7.	"Good Times"
8.	"Too Busy Thinking About My Baby"
9.	"Just My Imagination (Running Away with Me)"
10.	"He Will Break Your Heart"
11.	"Gypsy Woman"
12.	"Somebody Have Mercy"
13.	"Share Your Love with Me"
14.	"All I Have to Offer You Is Me"
