= Ted Hawkins =

American singer-songwriter

- Hawkins in a promotional photograph for his album The Next Hundred Years, seated on a milk crate, as he did when busking

Background information
- Born: October 28, 1936; Biloxi, Mississippi, United States
- Died: January 1, 1995 (aged 58) Los Angeles, California, United States
- Genre: Soul blues
- Occupation: Musician
- Label: DGC

Ted Hawkins (October 28, 1936 – January 1, 1995) was an American singer-songwriter born in Biloxi, Mississippi. He split his time between his adopted hometown of Venice Beach, California, where he was a mostly anonymous street performer, and Europe and Australia, where he and his songs were better known and well received in clubs and small concert halls.

== Life and career ==
Hawkins was born in Biloxi, Mississippi. His mother was a prostitute and he never knew the identity of his father. He was sent to a reform school when he was 12 years old. As a teenager Hawkins drifted, hitchhiked, and stole his way across the country for the next dozen years, earning several stays in prison, including a three-year stint for stealing a leather jacket as a teenager. Along the way, he picked up a love of music and a talent for the guitar. "I was sent to a school for bad boys called Oakley Training School in 1949," he wrote in a brief piece of autobiography. "There I developed my voice by singing with a group that the superintendent's wife had got together." After reform school, he ended up in the state penitentiary and was released at 19. "Then I heard a singer whose name was Sam Cooke. His voice did something to me."

For the next ten years or so he drifted in and out of trouble around the country, living in Chicago, Buffalo, Philadelphia, and Newark. In the middle of the mid-1960s folk music boom Hawkins set out for California to try for a professional singing career. He recorded several tunes without commercial success, worked at odd jobs, and took up busking along the piers and storefronts of Venice Beach as a way to supplement his income. Hawkins made ends meet by developing a small following of locals and tourists who would come to hear this Southern black man, sitting on an overturned milk crate, play blues and folk standards and a few original songs in his signature open guitar tuning and raspy vocal style. Hawkins claimed the rasp in his voice came from the damage done by years of singing in the sand and spray of the boardwalk.

A series of record producers and promoters "discovered" Hawkins over the years, only to be thwarted by circumstance and Hawkins's unconventional life. The first was the musicologist and blues producer Bruce Bromberg, who approached Hawkins about a recording contract in the early 1970s. Hawkins tentatively agreed and recorded some dozen songs for Bromberg, but Hawkins faced legal trouble and spent much of the next decade in prison and addicted to heroin. Bromberg lost contact with Hawkins until 1982, when was able to get him to agree to release the previously recorded songs as an album, Watch Your Step, which was released by Rounder Records in 1982. This debut album was a commercial failure but received rave reviews (notably a rare five-star rating in Rolling Stone).

In December 1984, Hawkins was released from the California State Medical Facility at Vacaville, after serving 18 months of a three-year sentence on a child molestation charge (due to indecent exposure in the midst of suffering nervous breakdowns). Hawkins reunited with Bromberg in 1985 for a second album, Happy Hour. This album featured more original songs by Hawkins and was again ignored in the U.S.; however, it won acclaim and sales in Europe. English radio DJ Andy Kershaw encouraged Hawkins to come to the United Kingdom, and he moved to the resort town of Bridlington in 1986 and enjoyed his first taste of commercial musical success, touring Europe and Asia. However, after four years in England, in 1990 he was deported back to the United States by the British Government, ostensibly on drug-related charges, although Hawkins later dismissed this by saying the reason was simply "I was having visa problems...they deported me. My time ran out. England is a good place. It’s just that I had a lot of bills back home and I hadn’t seen my family. I had to get back home."

During this period Hawkins refined his musical style, a mixture of folk music, country music, Deep South spirituals, and soul music. His style was informed by but did not resemble traditional blues music. Hawkins claimed he could not play the blues or bend notes with his damaged fretting hand. He wore a leather glove to protect his fretting hand and often used long acrylic nails on the thumb and index fingers on his other hand to strum with.

In 1987, the documentary filmmaker Nick Shaw approached Hawkins about producing a profile of his life and times, for which he followed Hawkins closely for the next two years. The documentary was eventually taken up by the Arts Council of Great Britain, but it has never been formally released. Some of the footage was included in the documentary film Amazing Grace, produced by David Geffen.

Despite the recognition and fame he received in Europe, Hawkins was restless and moved back to California in the early 1990s and again took on the role of a street performer. Several musicians and promoters encouraged Hawkins to record, but he did so only on occasion and without much enthusiasm, until he agreed to record a full album for Geffen Records and producer Tony Berg. For this first major-label release, The Next Hundred Years, Berg added session musicians to Hawkins's typical solo guitar-and-vocal arrangements for the first time, and brought national attention and respectable sales to Hawkins (though Hawkins, in typically contrary fashion, claimed to dislike the result, preferring his unaccompanied versions). Hawkins began to tour on the basis of this success, commenting that he had finally reached an age where he was glad to be able to sing indoors, out of the weather, and for an appreciative crowd. He died of a stroke at the age of 58, just a few months after the release of his breakthrough recording. In 2014, in cooperation with his family, the Killer Blues Headstone Project placed a headstone for Ted Hawkins at Inglewood Park Cemetery in Inglewood, California.

His widow, Elizabeth Hawkins, sold the rights for a film version of Hawkins's life story.

Hawkins is the subject of Mick Thomas's song "57 Years". In the novel The Island (2010), by R J Price (better known as the poet Richard Price), the fictional Graham and Linda are brought together at a concert by Hawkins in Glasgow, Scotland.

Cold and Bitter Tears: The Songs of Ted Hawkins was released in late 2015 by Eight 30 Records, based in Austin, Texas. The album was produced by Kevin Russell, Jenni Finlay and Brian T. Atkinson and features James McMurtry ("Big Things"), Kasey Chambers ("Cold and Bitter Tears"), Mary Gauthier ("Sorry You're Sick"), Shinyribs ("Who Got My Natural Comb") and several others singing songs by Hawkins.

== Discography ==
Ted Hawkins albums
Date	Title	Label	Charted
1982	Watch Your Step	Rounder	—
1986	Happy Hour	Rounder	UK, No. 82
1986	On the Boardwalk at Venice Beach	Thorp Minister	—
1989	I Love You Too	PT Records	—
1994	The Next Hundred Years	Geffen	AUS No. 20
1995	Songs from Venice Beach	Evidence	—
1998	Love You Most of All – More Songs from Venice Beach	Evidence	—
1998	The Final Tour (live 1994)	Evidence	—
1998	The Ted Hawkins Story: Suffer No More	Rhino, compilation	—
2000	The Kershaw Sessions: Live at the BBC (1986–1989)	Varese Sarabande	—
2001	The Unstoppable Ted Hawkins (live in London, 1988)	Catfish Records	—
2001	Nowhere to Run	Catfish Records	—
2009	Cold and Bitter Tears, compilation	Rounder	—

Hawkins also appears on the Geffen Records 1996 compilation Just Say Noël.
