= Watch Your Step (Raised Fist album) =

Compilation album by Raised Fist
- Released: September 24, 2001
- Genre: Hardcore, Punk
- Length: 42:43
- Label: Burning Heart Records

Raised Fist chronology
Ignoring the Guidelines (2000)	Watch Your Step (2001)	Dedication (2002)

Watch Your Step is a compilation album of earlier releases and rarities songs by hardcore band Raised Fist. Winston McCall of Parkway Drive listed it among "the 10 albums that changed my life," writing "They were the first band that got me into heavier music other than punk rock. They were a bridging band before Hatebreed came along. There was some crazy statistic that they sold more records in our area, East Coast Australia, than anywhere else in the world!”

== Track listing ==
1. Stronger Than Ever
2. Reduction of Hate
3. Torn Apart
4. I've Tried
5. Next
6. The Answer
7. Time for Changes
8. Soldiers of Today
9. E-skile
10. Too Late to Change
11. Respect
12. To Make Up My Mind
13. Give Yourself a Chance
14. Break Free
15. Stand Up and Fight
16. Flame Still Burns
17. Maintain
18. Untruth
19. Peak

== Musicians ==
- Marco Eronen – guitar
- Daniel Holmberg – guitar
- Oskar Karlsson – drums
- Andreas "Josse" Johansson – bass
- Alexander "Alle" Rajkovic – vocals
