= Stronger Than Ever (EP) =

EP by Raised Fist
- Released: June 3, 1996
- Genre: Hardcore, Punk
- Length: 20:12
- Label: Burning Heart Records

Raised Fist chronology
| You're Not Like Me (1994) | Stronger Than Ever (1996) | Fuel (1998) |

Stronger Than Ever is the second EP of hardcore band Raised Fist. It was released in 1996.

== Track listing ==
1. Stronger Than Ever
2. Reduction of Hate
3. Torn Apart
4. I’ve Tried
5. Next
6. The Answer
7. Time for Changes
8. Soldiers of Today
9. E-skile

== Musicians ==
- Marco Eronen - Guitar
- Peter Karlsson – drums
- Andreas "Josse" Johansson - Bass
- Alexander "Alle" Hagman - Vocals
