= The Magical World of Roger Whittaker =

Studio album by Roger Whittaker
- Released: 1975
- Genre: Folk, world, country, children's music
- Language: English
- Label: Music for Pleasure – MFP, RCA Records
- Director: Toni Campo

Roger Whittaker chronology
| The Last Farewell & Other Hits (1974) | The Magical World of Roger Whittaker (1975) | Reflections of Love (1976) |

The Magical World of Roger Whittaker is the 8th album by Roger Whittaker. It is a collection of children's music. It was released in 1975 on the EMI budget label Music for Pleasure in the U.K. and by RCA Records in the U.S.

== Release ==
=== UK release ===
Music for Pleasure – MFP (UK) (1975)

=== US release ===
Label: RCA – ANL1-1405
Format: LP Album
Country: USA
Released: 1975

== Track listing ==
Side one
| No. | Title | Writer(s) | Style | Length |
|---|---|---|---|---|
| 1. | "Googleye" | John D. Loudermilk | Vocal |
| 2. | "Nasty Spider" | Jeremy Tayor | Vocal |
| 3. | "Boa Constrictor" | Shel Silverstein | Vocal |
| 4. | "Winkin’, Blinkin’ And Nod" | Eugene Field | Vocal |
| 5. | "Whistle Stop" | Billy Hayes, Roger Whittaker | Whistling |
| 6. | "Little Dreamer" | Brian Knowles, Mike Nuttall |
| 7. | "The Fox" | Traditional | Vocal |

Side two
| No. | Title | Writer(s) | Length |
|---|---|---|---|
| 1. | "The Unicorn Song" | Shel Silverstein |
| 2. | "Puff (The Magic Dragon)" | Leonard Lipton, Peter Yarrow |
| 3. | "Yellow Bird" | Oswald Durand |
| 4. | "Big Rock Candy Mountain" | Traditional |
| 5. | "Blues For Lauren-Marie" | Roger Whittaker, David Berkwood |
| 6. | "Bottle Tops" |
