= New World in the Morning =

Studio album by Roger Whittaker
- Released: 1971
- Recorded: 1970
- Genre: Folk
- Label: EMI
- Producer: Denis Preston

Roger Whittaker chronology
| New World in the Morning (1971) | For My Friends... (1972) |

Singles from New World in the Morning
- 1. "The Last Farewell" Released: October 1974

New World in the Morning is a studio album by British singer-songwriter Roger Whittaker released by EMI in 1971. (Note: The 1971 EMI album should not be confused with a like-named 1970 album released on the RCA label in North America with a different track listing, including "Durham Town (The Leavin')".) It features some of his most popular folk songs, including the international hit "The Last Farewell" as well as "A Special Kind of Man" and "Streets of London". Whittaker first performed the title track, "New World in the Morning", at a 1969 music festival in Rio de Janeiro. When released as a single, it reached number 17 in the UK and number 12 in the US Easy Listening charts.

== Album Synopsis ==
=== British release ===
Whittaker recorded the album in 1970 and it was released in 1971 at the peak of his popularity. It included the international hit "The Last Farewell", which was released as a single, and won Whittaker an Ivor Novello Award for songwriting. "No Blade of Grass" was utilised as the title song for the film of the same name.

The album was only issued on vinyl and never been released to CD, and current digital versions of the album's most popular songs have been re-recordings done by Whittaker in the 1980s and 1990s.

=== American release ===
Included on the North American release were the songs "Why?", "What Love Is" and "Mexican Whistler", while "New World in the Morning", whilst "From Both Sides Now" and "Streets of London" were omitted. In the US and Canada most of these songs appeared on Whittaker's 1971 album "A Special Kind of Man" release through RCA Records.

The song "New World in the Morning" had earlier been released by Hagood Hardy in June 1970.

== Track listing ==
1. "Candy Cloud" (Roger Whittaker, Ken Pritchett)
2. "A Special Kind of Man" (Whittaker, Mike Richards)
3. "No Blade of Grass" (Charles Carroll, Louis Nelius)
4. "Moonshine" (Whittaker, Kusha Petts)
5. "Morning Please Don't Come" (Tom Springfield)
6. "New World in the Morning" (Whittaker)
7. "My Kind" (Whittaker)
8. "The Last Farewell" (Whittaker, Ron A. Webster)
9. "From Both Sides Now" (Joni Mitchell)
10. "Paradise" (Whittaker, Joy Leslie)
11. "Streets of London" (Ralph McTell)
12. "He Starts Below" (Whittaker, Mike Hargraves)

== Charts ==
| Chart (1975) | Peak position |
|---|---|
| Australia (Kent Music Report) | 66 |
