= Raised Fist =

Swedish hardcore punk band

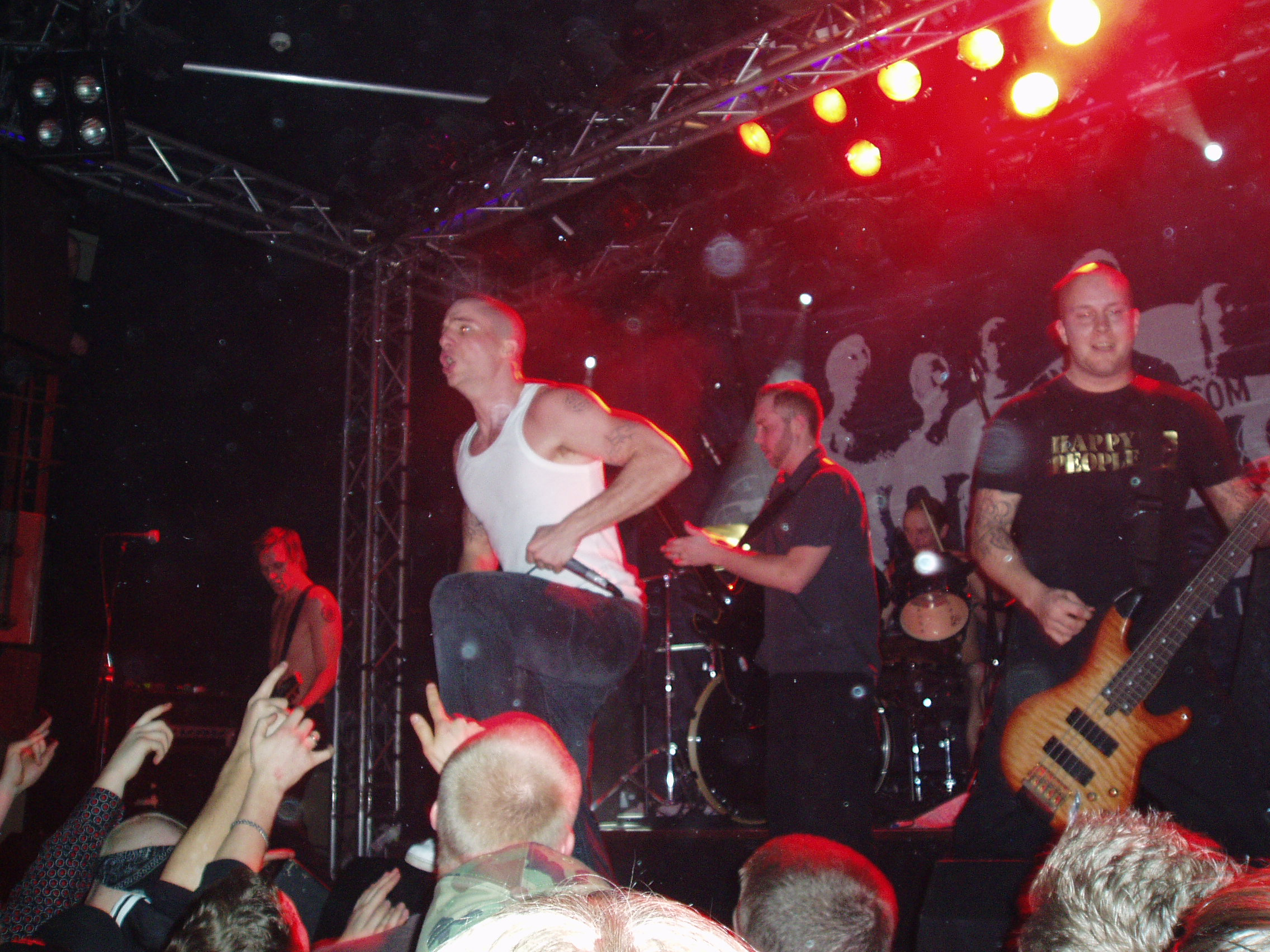
- Live at Sticky Fingers

Background information
- Also known as: RF
- Origin: Luleå, Norrbotten, Sweden
- Genres: Hardcore punk
- Years active: 1993–present
- Label: Burning Heart/Epitaph
- Members: Andreas Johansson; Alexander Hagman; Daniel Holmgren; Jimmy Tikkanen; Robert Wiiand
- Past members: See members section
- Website: raisedfist.com

Raised Fist is a Swedish hardcore punk band formed in 1993 in Luleå. It currently consists of bassist Andreas Johansson, vocalist Alexander Hagman, guitarists Daniel Holmgren and Jimmy Tikkanen, and drummer Robert Wiiand.

== History ==
Raised Fist was formed in 1993 on the island of Hertsön in Luleå, Sweden, with Alexander "Alle" Hagman as lead vocalist and Andreas "Josse" Johansson on bass, the only remaining original members. The name "Raised Fist" refers to the Rage Against the Machine song "Know Your Enemy", which include the lyrics: "Born with an insight and a raised fist"

They were signed to Burning Heart Records, an independent record label notable for being the home of many influential Swedish punk rock and hardcore punk bands in the 90s and 2000s.

The band played at the Scandinavian Roskilde Festival in 2004.

In 2010 Hagman received a serious electrical shock during a concert in Sundsvall when he touched a power cable which had been punctured by a riot fence. He collapsed on the stage.

The band's album Veil of Ignorance, released in 2009, was the last released on Burning Heart Records. It placed on the Swedish charts and was nominated for a Swedish Grammy Award. Many of the songs on this album were written by Hagman.

After Burning Heart folded in 2010, Raised Fist signed a two-album contract with Epitaph Records in 2013. In 2015, after working on the songs for five years, Raised Fist released their sixth album, From the North. This was followed in 2019 by their seventh album, Anthems.

== Appearances ==
Vocalist Alexander appeared in an interview on Swedish television TV4 where he criticizes the EU Directive on the enforcement of intellectual property rights in EU countries.

== Members ==
Current

- Andreas "Josse" Johansson – bass (1993–present)
- Alexander "Alle" Hagman – vocals (1993–present)
- Daniel Holmgren – guitar (1998–present)
- Jimmy Tikkanen – guitar (2011–present)
- Robert Wiiand – drums (2017–present)

Former

- Petri "Pecka" Rönnberg – guitars (1993–1996)
- "Peson" – guitars (1993–1996), († died 2002)
- Marco Eronen – guitars (1996–2011)
- Peter "Pita" Karlsson – drums (1993–1996)
- Oskar Karlsson – drums (1996–2005), († died 2016)
- Matte Modin – drums (2005–2017)

Timeline

== Discography ==
=== Studio albums ===
Year	Album	Peak positions	Certification
Year	Album	SWE	Certification
1998	Fuel	–	
2000	Ignoring the Guidelines	–	
2002	Dedication	–	
2006	Sound of the Republic	–	
2009	Veil of Ignorance	22	
2015	From the North	6	
2019	Anthems	13	

=== EP ===
- You're Not Like Me (1994)
- Stronger Than Ever (1996)

=== Compilations ===
- Heartattack Vol. 1: Burning Heart Compilation (Disc 2)
- Watch Your Step (2001)
- Punk-o-Rama 6, 8
- Cheap Shots 1,2,3,4
- Hardcore for Syria
