= Alexander Hagman =

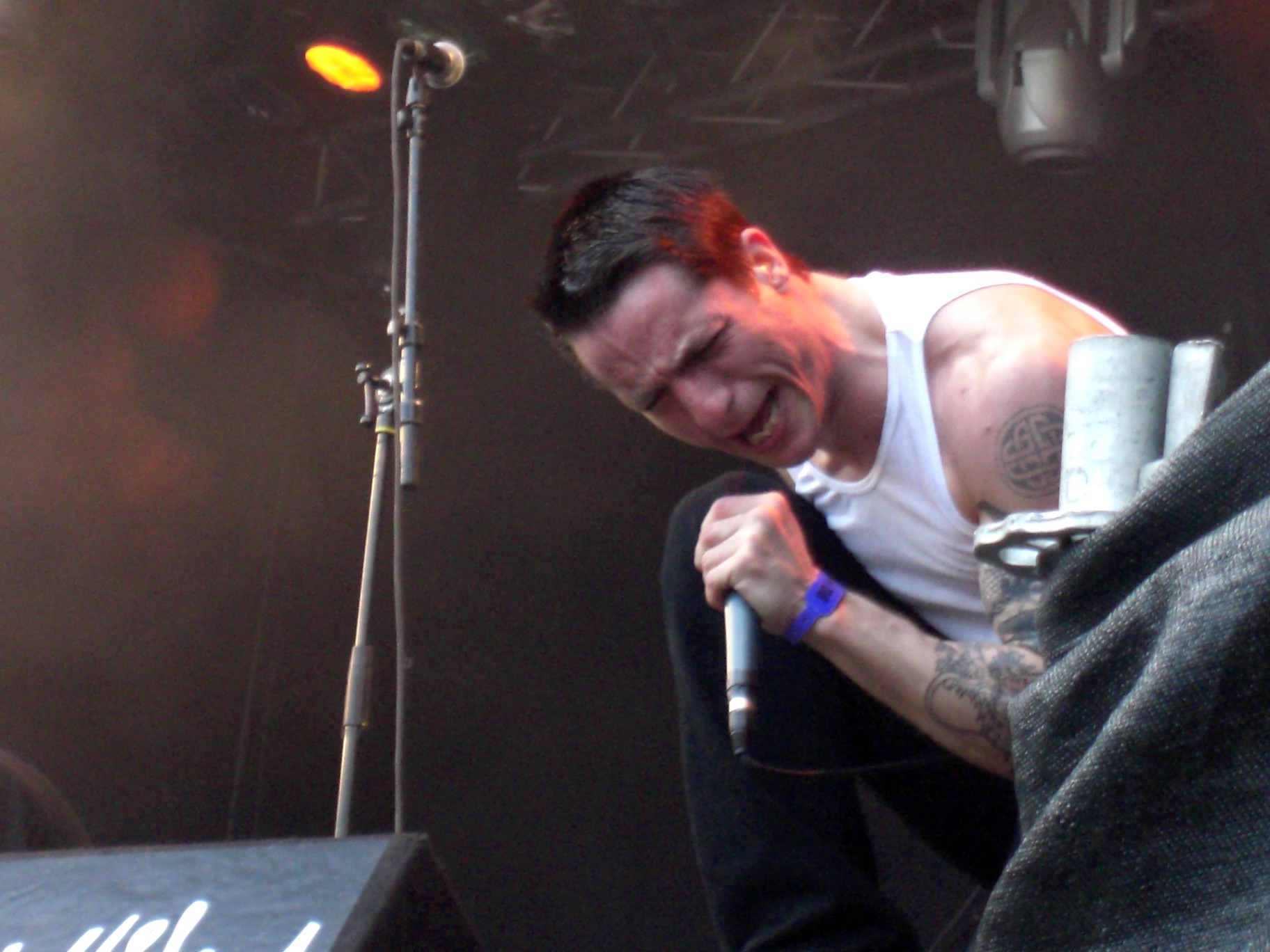

Background information
- Born: 11 February 1975 (age 50)
- Origin: Luleå, Sweden
- Genres: Hardcore, alternative metal
- Occupations: Musician, singer-songwriter, record producer, martial artist, Brazilian jiu-jitsu competitor
- Instrument: Vocals
- Years active: 1990–present
- Labels: Epitaph Records, Burning Heart Records
- Website: raisedfist.com

Alexander Hagman (born 11 February 1975) is the vocalist of the Swedish band Raised Fist. Hagman and bassist Andreas Johansson are the only two members who have been with the group since its formation in 1993. Hagman is also a Brazilian jiu-jitsu competitor and certified instructor under renowned Jiu Jitsu practitioners Rener Gracie and Ryron Gracie out of Gracie University HQ in Los Angeles. In 2015 Hagman opened the first Gracie University certified training center in Scandinavia. In 2018 Alexander won silver medal in North American Grappling Association European Championship (expert division).
