= Roger Whittaker =

Kenyan and British musician (1936–2023)

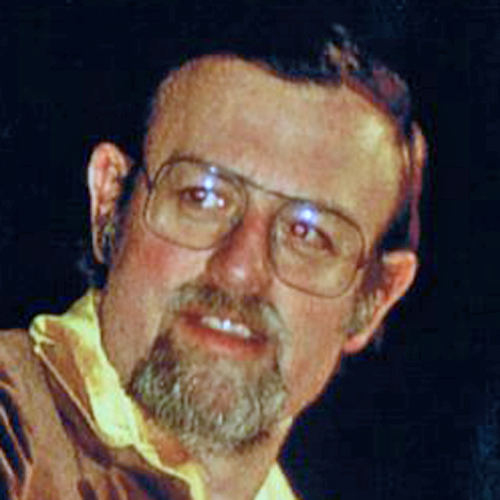
- Whittaker performing in 1976

Background information
- Also known as: Rog Whittaker (note: billing for "The Charge of the Light Brigade", Fontana records single)
- Born: Roger Henry Brough Whittaker; 22 March 1936; Nairobi, Kenya Colony
- Died: 13 September 2023 (aged 87) Castelsarrasin, France
- Genres: Folk; pop; schlager
- Occupations: Musician; singer-songwriter; teacher
- Instruments: Guitar; vocals; whistling
- Years active: 1962–2013
- Labels: Fontana Records, Columbia Records, RCA Victor (US releases)
- Website: rogerwhittaker.com

Roger Henry Brough Whittaker (22 March 1936 – 13 September 2023) was a Kenyan and British singer-songwriter and musician. His music is an eclectic mixture of folk music and popular songs, the latter variously in a crooning or in a schlager style. He was best known for his baritone singing voice and trademark whistling ability as well as his guitar skills.

The Times observed that "[s]ome pop singers define the zeitgeist and many more follow it. A much rarer number of them defy it and Roger Whittaker counted himself proudly and unapologetically among them". Despite not obtaining sustained chart success, he gained a large international following through TV appearances and live performances, with fan clubs in at least 12 countries (including Australia, Canada, Great Britain, New Zealand, South Africa, and the United States). One admirer was US president George H. W. Bush, at whose home he was invited to perform.

Whittaker was best known internationally for his 1971 single "The Last Farewell", which charted in 11 countries. In the United States, where the song was released four years later, it became his only entry in the Billboard Hot 100, and reached number one on the Adult Contemporary chart. Whittaker was widely known for his own compositions, including "Durham Town (The Leavin')" (1969) and "I Don't Believe in If Anymore" (1970). American audiences are most familiar with his 1970 hit album New World in the Morning and his renditions of "Ding! Dong! Merrily on High" and "The Twelve Days of Christmas". From the 1970s onward he had great success and a devoted fan base in Germany singing in German. His 1977 Greatest Hits album All My Best was marketed on television through mail order and went on to sell nearly one million copies. In total, he sold an estimated 50–60 million records during his career.

== Early life and education ==
Whittaker was born in Nairobi, in what was then called the Colony and Protectorate of Kenya, to English parents, Vi (née Snowden) and Edward Whittaker, who were from Staffordshire, where they owned and operated a grocery shop. His father was injured in a motorcycle accident and the family moved to a farm near Thika, Kenya, because of its warmer climate. His grandfather sang in various clubs and his father played the violin. Whittaker learned how to whistle as a boy, and learned to play the guitar on an instrument made for him during the Second World War by an Italian prisoner of war from the North African campaign. He was quoted as saying that all he wanted as a child were country and western gramophone records by artists such as The Carter Family and Jimmie Rodgers, to which he used to sing along.

Upon completing his primary education, Whittaker was admitted to Prince of Wales School (now Nairobi School), and whilst there sang in the choir at All Saints' Cathedral in central Nairobi. Upon completing his high-school education, he was called up for national service and spent two years in the Kenya Regiment fighting the Mau Mau in the Aberdare Forest. He said that he was "stupid, selfish, and angry" in his youth, and that the British Army "made a man" out of him. After demobilisation in 1956, he enrolled at the University of Cape Town in South Africa to pursue a career in medicine, performing at the Equator Club in Nairobi during breaks. However, he left after 18 months and joined the civil service education department as a teacher, following in his mother's footsteps.

Whittaker moved to Britain in September 1959 to continue his teaching career. For the next three years, he studied zoology, biochemistry and marine biology at Bangor University in Wales and earned a Bachelor of Science degree while singing in local clubs and releasing songs on flexi discs included with the campus newspaper, the Bangor University Rag. Reflecting upon this time in his life, he said later that "I guess I was an entertainer who was a biochemist for a while, rather than the other way around".

== Recording and concert career ==
Whittaker was shortly signed to Fontana Records, which released his first professional single, "The Charge of the Light Brigade", in 1962. (On the labels of the Fontana singles, he is billed as "Rog Whittaker"). In the summer of 1962, Whittaker performed in Portrush, Northern Ireland. He achieved a breakthrough when he was signed to appear on an Ulster Television show called This and That. His second single was a cover version of "Steel Men", released in June 1962.

In 1966, Whittaker switched from Fontana to EMI's Columbia label, and was billed as Roger Whittaker from this point forward. His fourth single for the imprint was his self-composed "Durham Town (The Leavin')", which in 1969 became Whittaker's first UK Top 20 hit in the UK Singles Chart. Whittaker's US label, RCA Victor, released the uptempo "New World in the Morning" in 1970, where it became a Top 20 hit in Billboard magazine's Easy Listening chart. That same year, his downbeat theme song "No Blade of Grass", written for the film adaptation of the same name that was sung during both the opening and ending titles, became his first film credit.

In the early 1970s, Whittaker took interest in the Nordic countries when he recorded the single "Where the Angels Tread" (Änglamarken) to the music of Evert Taube in 1972.

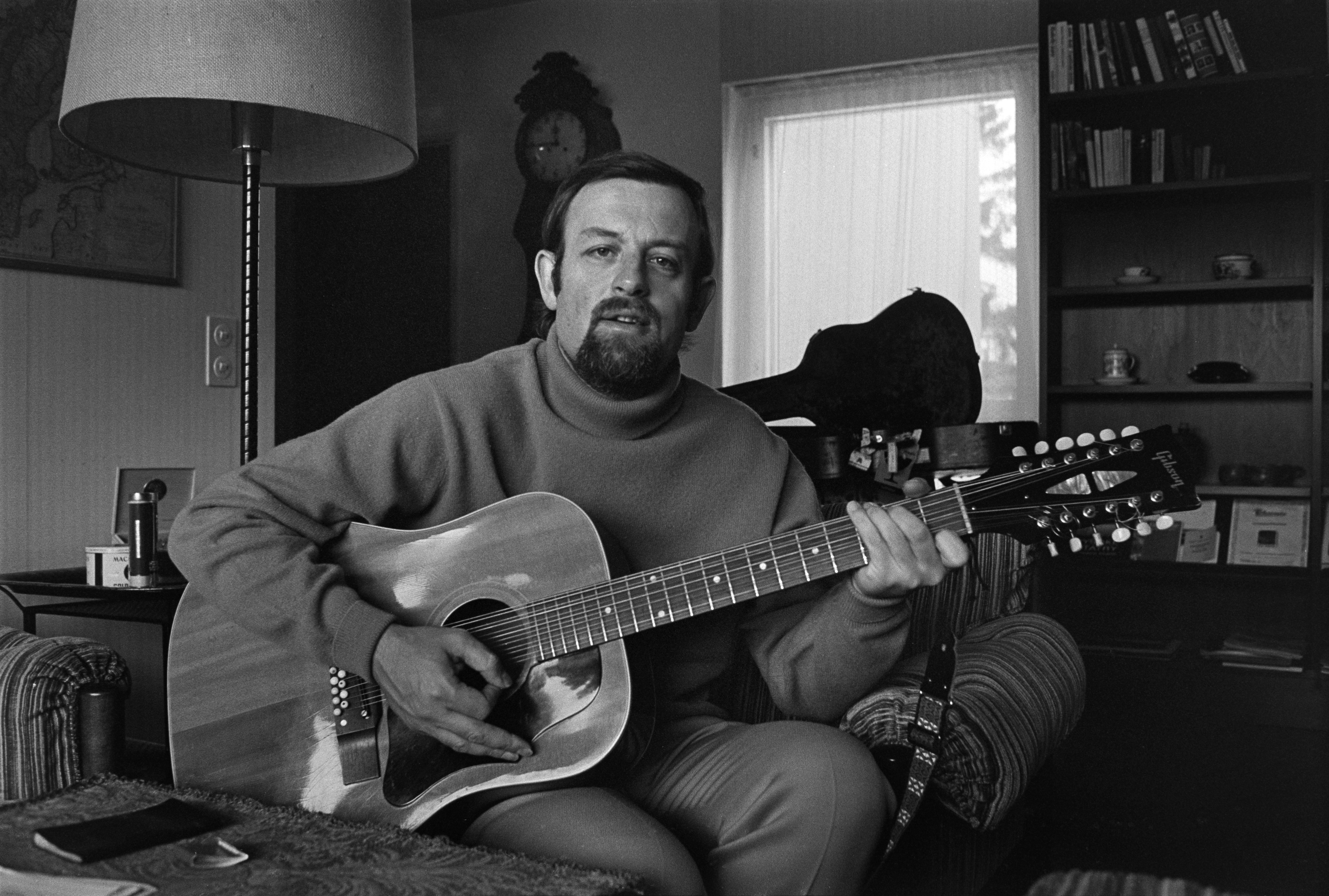
Whittaker in 1971

In 1974 he performed at the Finnish Eurovision qualifications.

In 1975, EMI released "The Last Farewell", a track from Whittaker's 1971 New World in the Morning album. It became his biggest hit and a signature song, selling more than 11 million copies worldwide. In 1979, he wrote the song "Call My Name" which, performed by Eleanor Keenan, reached the final of the UK Eurovision selection, A Song For Europe, and came third. Whittaker recorded the song himself and the single charted in several European countries. Released in December 1983, his version of Leon Payne's "I Love You Because" spent four weeks in the US Hot Country charts, peaking at number 91.

In 1986, Whittaker returned to the UK Top 10 with a hit duet of The Skye Boat Song sung alongside Des O'Connor.

Throughout the 1970s and 1980s, Whittaker had success in Germany, with German-language songs produced by Nick Munro. Unable to speak German, Whittaker sang the songs phonetically. His biggest hits in Germany included "Du warst mein schönster Traum" (a rerecording of "The Last Farewell") and "Abschied ist ein scharfes Schwert" ("parting is a sharp sword"). He appeared regularly on the TV series ZDF-Hitparade, received numerous awards, and was West Germany's bestselling artist of 1977, when he completed a 41-concert tour of the country. Whittaker's German-language songs were not initially well received by some critics, who derided the songs as "meaningless folk music". Notwithstanding this, Whittaker released 25 albums in Germany and gained a considerable fan base in that country; he felt his most loyal fans were there, stating "Die letzten Jahrzehnte sind wunderbar gewesen ... Meine Beziehung zu den deutschen Fans ist großartig." ("The past few decades have been wonderful ... My relationship with the German fans is great.")

In March 2006, Whittaker announced on his website that a 2007 Germany tour would be his last, and that he would limit future performances to "occasional concerts". Having become more fluent in German, he was seen singing and was interviewed in German on Danish television in November 2008. In a 2014 interview, Whittaker reiterated that he had retired from touring in 2013, but said that he had written 18 new songs for an album and said "I still whistle very well".

== Personal life and death ==
Whittaker married Natalie O'Brien on 15 August 1964. They had five children, 12 grandchildren, and two great-grandchildren. Additionally, Whittaker was the uncle of BBC broadcaster Simon Logan. In 1986, he published his autobiography, So Far, So Good, co-written with his wife, who became his manager in 1989.

Whittaker's father never forgave his son for abandoning a medical career, and their differences were never resolved. His parents did not attend any of their son's concerts and refused to participate in an episode of This Is Your Life where he was the subject. Still living in Nairobi, they were the victims of a robbery on 1 April 1989 in which a small gang of men killed Whittaker's father and left his mother, who freed herself some hours later, tied up in the bathroom. The perpetrators were never caught, and Whittaker's mother returned to England where she died in 1996. Whittaker said of the incident: "It will affect me for the rest of my life, but I believe we should all live without hate if we can".

Whittaker was involved in efforts to save the black rhino, donating recording royalties and money from concert program sales to create sanctuaries for the species in Kenya.

After living in Ireland for some years, he retired with his wife to France in 2012, ending his final tour in 2013. He died in a hospital near Toulouse on 13 September 2023, aged 87. His long-time publicist Howard Elson said the cause was “complications following a long illness.”

== Tours ==
In 1976, Whittaker undertook his first tour of the United States. In 2003, he again toured Germany. After recovering from heart problems at the end of 2004, he started touring in Germany in 2005, and then in the UK from May to July.

== Awards ==
During his career, Whittaker earned over 250 silver, gold, and platinum awards. With his song "The Mexican Whistler", he was part of a successful British team that won the 1967 Knokke Music Festival in Belgium, when he received the Press Prize as the personality of the festival.

He was awarded a Gold Badge Award by the British Academy of Songwriters, Composers and Authors (BASCA) in 1988 and earned a Goldene Stimmgabel ("Golden Tuning Fork") in Germany in 1986, based on record sales and TV viewer votes.

Whittaker was the subject of This Is Your Life in 1982 when he was surprised by Eamonn Andrews at RAF Northolt.

== Discography ==
=== Albums ===
- New World in the Morning (1971)
- All My Best (1971)
- The Magical World of Roger Whittaker (1975)
- The Roger Whittaker Christmas Album (1978)
- Roger Whittaker in Kenya: A Musical Safari (1984)
- Greatest Hits (1994)
