= Watch Your Step (Ted Hawkins album) =

Compilation album by Ted Hawkins
- Released: 1982
- Recorded: 1971–72
- Studios: Eldorado, Los Angeles
- Label: Rounder
- Producers: Bruce Bromberg; Dennis Walker

Ted Hawkins chronology
Watch Your Step (1982)	Happy Hour (1986)

Watch Your Step is a 1982 album by Ted Hawkins, a collection of previously recorded songs.

== Release ==
At the time of the album's release, Hawkins was a prisoner/patient of the California Medical Facility in Vacaville.

== Critical reception ==
Professional ratings
Review scores
Source	Rating
AllMusic	3.5/5 stars
Robert Christgau	A−
The Encyclopedia of Popular Music	4/5 stars
The Line of Best Fit	7/10
The New Rolling Stone Record Guide	5/5 stars
Tom Hull – on the Web	B+

The Boston Phoenix called Watch Your Step "a triumph ... much more than the best blues album of the year -- it's an unexpected hybrid, the first folk-soul masterpiece." Trouser Press wrote: "Teaching a mighty acoustic lesson in roots music, Hawkins inhabits that secular place just outside the churchyard where gospel, folk and soul meet." Robert Christgau wrote that "these little dramas of passion, tenderness and betrayal are stamped with the sin-and-redemption of a lived life." The New Rolling Stone Record Guide wrote that "soul and blues fans need to hear this, if only to restore their faith in the dying art of emotional conviction."

== Track listing ==
All songs were written by Theodore Hawkins, Jr. (i.e. Ted Hawkins); who also sang and played guitar on all of them.

1. "Watch Your Step" – Acoustic version
2. "Bring It Home Daddy"
3. "If You Love Me"
4. "Don't Lose Your Cool"
5. "The Lost Ones"
6. "Who Got My Natural Comb?"
7. "Peace & Happiness"
8. "Sweet Baby"
9. "Stop Your Crying"
10. "Put In a Cross"
11. "Sorry You're Sick"
12. "Watch Your Step" – Full band version
13. "TWA"
14. "I Gave Up All I Had"
15. "Stay Close to Me"

== Personnel ==
According to an early vinyl release:

- Ted Hawkins – guitar, vocals
- Elizabeth Hawkins – vocals on "Don't Lose Your Cool" and "I Gave Up All I Had"
- Phillip Walker – lead guitar on 2, 6, 8, 12
- Arthur Woods – piano on 2, 6, 8, 12
- Ollie "Count" Gaines – bass on 2, 8, 12
- Dennis Walker – bass on "Who Got My Natural Comb?"
- Donny Tucker – drums on 2, 6, 8, 12
- David Majal Li – saxophone on 2, 6, 8, 12
- Melvin Moore – trumpet on 2, 6, 8, 12
- Ina Bea Walker and Jimmy Grisby – backing vocals on "Bring It Home Daddy"
