= The Last Farewell =

Single by Roger Whittaker

from the album New World in the Morning
- B-side: "A Special Kind of Man" "Paradise" (North American release)
- Released: October 1974
- Recorded: 1970
- Genre: Pop
- Length: 3:38
- Label: RCA
- Songwriters: Roger Whittaker; Ron A. Webster
- Producer: Denis Preston

Roger Whittaker singles chronology
| "Mamy Blue" (1971) | "The Last Farewell" (1974) | "Google Eye" (1974) |

"The Last Farewell" is a song by the British folk singer Roger Whittaker (music and vocals on the original recording) and Ron A. Webster (poem and lyrics). Whittaker hosted a radio programme in the United Kingdom, backed by an orchestra with arrangements by Zack Lawrence. Roger Whittaker said, "One of the ideas I had was to invite listeners to send their poems or lyrics to me and I would make songs out of them. We got a million replies, and I did one each week for 26 weeks."

Ron Arthur Webster (1944–1994), a silversmith from Solihull Birmingham, England, sent Roger Whittaker his poem entitled "The Last Farewell", and this song became one of the selections to appear on the radio programme. Webster was working for a company called "Lancaster Engraving" in Hockley. He was travelling home on the upper deck of a Midland bus on a cold and rainy night and wished he were somewhere warm instead. That is when the inspiration for the song came to him. Webster told the Coventry Evening Telegraph, according to an article published on the 10th September 1975, that he had been writing songs in his spare time for about 15 years. He had written "The Last Farewell" with Roger Whittaker in mind. But this was already before the singer had invited listeners to his radio programme to submit poems.

It was recorded, and featured on Whittaker's 1971 album New World in the Morning (A Special Kind of Man in the US and Canada). It is one of the fifty all-time singles to have sold 10 million (or more) physical copies worldwide.

== Popularity ==
According to Whittaker, the wife of a programme director for a radio station in Atlanta, Georgia, was travelling in Canada, in 1975, and heard Whittaker's four-year-old recording on the radio. After she returned to the United States, she asked her husband to play it on the station. After he played the song a few times, listeners called the station to discover more about the song and singer, and soon "The Last Farewell" was in the charts. The single reached the Top 20 on the Billboard Hot 100 chart, peaking at number 19 in June 1975, the only single of Whittaker's career to appear on the Hot 100. It also went to number 1 on the Billboard adult contemporary chart. The song first hit the Canadian charts in November 1974 and peaked at number 64 in December. It then re-entered the charts in April 1975.

The response in America led to the single's success in other parts of the world, including the United Kingdom, peaking at number 2 on the UK singles chart. It was kept from number 1 in the UK by Rod Stewart's "Sailing", resulting in an oddity that the top 2 songs in the UK singles chart at the time had a nautical theme. "The Last Farewell" also went to number 1 in 11 other countries, selling an estimated 11 million copies worldwide, making it Whittaker's best-known song.

Whittaker says much of the appeal of "The Last Farewell" comes from the classical-sounding nature of the opening French horn solo. This arrangement was done by Zack Lawrence for the song's initial airing on Whittaker's radio programme.

From the mid-1970s until about 1981, television station WGN-TV, "Chicago's Very Own Channel Nine" used the introductory fanfare in its station identification.

== Cover versions ==
The song has since been covered by many artists. In 1976, Elvis Presley included "The Last Farewell" on his album From Elvis Presley Boulevard, Memphis, Tennessee. This version was released as a posthumous single in the UK in 1984, peaking at number 48 in December.

Also reaching the UK singles chart with a version of "The Last Farewell" was the Ship's Company and Royal Marine Band of HMS Ark Royal, just before the aircraft carrier was decommissioned by the Royal Navy in December 1978. It peaked at number 41 in January 1979.

== Charts ==
=== Weekly charts ===
| Chart (1975) | Peak position |
|---|---|
| Australia (Kent Music Report) | 3 |
| Austria (Ö3 Austria Top 40) | 19 |
| Belgium (Ultratop 50 Flanders) | 4 |
| Belgium (Ultratop 50 Wallonia) | 18 |
| Canada (RPM) | 9 |
| Ireland (IRMA) | 2 |
| Netherlands (Single Top 100) | 10 |
| New Zealand (Recorded Music NZ) | 3 |
| Norway (VG-lista) | 1 |
| UK Singles (Official Charts) | 2 |
| US (Billboard Hot 100) | 19 |
| US (Adult Contemporary) | 1 |
| West Germany (GfK) | 19 |

=== Year-end charts ===
| Chart (1975) | Rank |
|---|---|
| Australia (Kent Music Report) | 17 |
| Canada (RPM) | 104 |

== See also ==
- List of number-one adult contemporary singles of 1975 (U.S.)
