= Jimmy Nail discography =

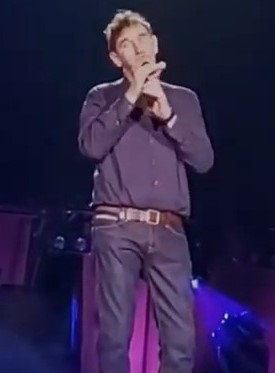
- Jimmy Nail in 2020
- Studio albums: 7
- Soundtrack albums: 2
- Compilation albums: 1
- Singles: 23
- Video albums: 2

This is a discography of works by Jimmy Nail. Since 1985, the British musician has released a total of seven studio albums, multiple singles and other works. This article also covers his works alongside musicians such as Mark Knopfler.

== Albums ==
=== Studio albums ===
List of albums, with selected chart positions, and certifications
Title	Album details	Peak chart positions				Certifications
Title	Album details	UK	AUS	NZ	SWE	Certifications
Take It or Leave It	Released: 1986; Label: Virgin; Format: LP, Cassette, CD	—	—	—	—	
Growing Up in Public	Released: 27 July 1992; Label: EastWest; Format: CD, LP, Cassette	2	64	36	49	UK: Gold
Crocodile Shoes	Released: November 1994; Label: EastWest; Format: CD, Cassette	2	146	49	4	UK: 3× Platinum
Big River	Released: November 1995; Label: EastWest; Format: CD, Cassette	8	176	—	—	UK: Platinum
Crocodile Shoes II	Released: November 1996; Label: EastWest; Format: CD, Cassette	10	—	—	34	UK: Platinum
Tadpoles in a Jar	Released: 1999; Label: EastWest; Format: CD	79	—	—	—	
10 Great Songs and an OK Voice	Released: 30 April 2001; Label: Papillon; Format: CD	76	—	—	—	
"—" denotes album that did not chart or was not released

=== Compilation albums ===
List of albums, with selected chart positions, and certifications
Title	Album details	Peak chart positions	Certifications
Title	Album details	UK	Certifications
The Nail File: The Best of Jimmy Nail	Released: October 1997; Label: EastWest; Format: CD	8	UK: Gold

=== Soundtrack albums ===
List of albums, with selected chart positions, and certifications
Title	Album details	Peak chart positions	Certifications
Title	Album details	UK	Certifications
Evita	Madonna, Antonio Banderas, Jonathan Pryce, Jimmy Nail; Released: 28 October 1996; Label: Warner Bros; Format: CD, Cassette	1	UK: 2× Platinum
Still Crazy	Strange Fruit, Jimmy Nail, Billy Connolly, Hans Matheson; Released: 4 October 1999; Label: London; Format: CD	—	
"—" denotes album that did not chart or was not released

== Singles ==
Title	Year	Peak chart positions										Certifications	Album
Title	Year	UK	AUS	AUT	FIN	GER	IRE	NLD	NZ	SWE	SWI	Certifications	Album
"Love Don't Live Here Anymore"	1985	3	—	—	—	—	5	28	—	—	—	UK: Silver	Take It or Leave It
"That's the Way Love Is"	1986	112	—	—	—	—	—	—	—	—	—		Take It or Leave It
"Walk Away"	1986	—	—	—	—	—	—	—	—	—	—		Take It or Leave It
"Ain't No Doubt"	1992	1	5	14	10^{[*]}	18	1	16	4	3	21	UK: Gold; AUS: Gold	Growing Up in Public
"Laura"	1992	58	146	—	—	—	—	—	—	—	—		Growing Up in Public
"Only Love (Can Bring Us Home)"	1992	—	—	—	—	—	—	—	—	—	—		Growing Up in Public
"Beautiful"	1993	79	—	—	—	—	—	—	—	—	—		Growing Up in Public
"Crocodile Shoes"	1994	4	147	—	—	—	16	—	—	21	—	UK: Gold	Crocodile Shoes
"Cowboy Dreams"	1995	13	—	—	—	—	28	—	—	—	—		Crocodile Shoes
"Calling Out Your Name"	1995	65	—	—	—	—	—	—	—	—	—		Crocodile Shoes
"Only One Heart" (Jimmy Nail featuring Margo Buchanan)	1995	155	—	—	—	—	—	—	—	—	—		Crocodile Shoes
"Big River"	1995	18	—	—	—	—	—	—	—	—	—		Big River
"Love"	1995	33	—	—	—	—	—	—	—	—	—		Big River
"Big River '96"	1996	72	—	—	—	—	—	—	—	—	—		Big River
"Country Boy"	1996	25	—	—	—	—	—	—	—	—	—		Crocodile Shoes II
"Blue Roses"	1996	—	—	—	—	—	—	—	—	—	—		Crocodile Shoes II
"Running Man"	1997	136	—	—	—	—	—	—	—	—	—		Crocodile Shoes II
"Black and White" (Jimmy Nail with Ranking Roger)	1997	76	—	—	—	—	—	—	—	—	—		The Nail File: The Best of Jimmy Nail
"Show Me Heaven"	1998	—	—	—	—	—	—	—	—	—	—		The Nail File: The Best of Jimmy Nail
"The Flame Still Burns" (Jimmy Nail with Strange Fruit)	1998	47	—	—	—	—	—	—	—	—	—		Still Crazy
"Blue Beyond the Grey"	1999	87	—	—	11	—	—	—	—	—	—		Tadpoles in a Jar
"Walking on the Moon"	2001	—	—	—	—	—	—	—	—	—	—		10 Great Songs and an OK Voice
"—" denotes a title that did not chart, or was not released in that territory.

Notes

- '* "Ain't No Doubt" did not chart on the Finnish Singles Chart, but it charted instead on the Finnish Airplay Chart.

=== Featured artist ===
Title	Year	Peak chart positions				Album
Title	Year	UK	GER	NLD	SWI	Album
"Why Aye Man" (Mark Knopfler featuring Jimmy Nail)	2002	81	79	45	85	The Ragpicker's Dream
"—" denotes a title that did not chart, or was not released in that territory.

== Videos ==
Video information
Somewhere in Time... Somewhere on Tour
- Released: 1995
- Track: 1. Crocodile Shoes, 2. Calling Out Your Name, 3. Cowboy Dreams, 4. Once upon A Time, 5. Love Will Find Someone For You, 6. What Kind Of A Man Am I?, 7. My Friend The Sun, 8. Bitter And Twisted, 9. Big River, 10. Love, 11. Dragons, 12. Angel, 13. Don't Wanna Go Home, 14. Love Don't Live Here Anymore, 15. Ain't No Doubt

Video information
Jimmy Nail - The Nail File - The Very Best of - Video Collection
- Released: 1997
- Track: 1. Love Don't Live Here Anymore, 2. Ain't No Doubt, 3. Crocodile Shoes (song), 4. Cowboy Dreams, 5. Big River, 6. Country Boy, 7. Blue Roses, 8. On This Night Of A Thousand Stars, 9. Running Man, 10. Love, 11. Once Upon A Time, 12. Dragons, 13. Absent Friends, 14. Calling Out Your Name, 15. Show Me Heaven, 16. Black And White.
