= The Nail File: The Best of Jimmy Nail =

Compilation album by Jimmy Nail
- Released: 1997
- Label: East West
- Producer: Jimmy Nail; David Caddick; Jon Kelly; Andrew Lloyd Webber; Tony McAnaney; Chris Neil; Alan Parker; Guy Pratt; David Richards; Steve Robson; Danny Schogger; Roger Taylor; Nigel Wright

Jimmy Nail chronology
Crocodile Shoes II (1996)	The Nail File: The Best of Jimmy Nail (1997)	Tadpoles in a Jar (1999)

Professional ratings
Review scores
Source	Rating
AllMusic	4.5/5 stars
NME	2/10 stars

The Nail File: The Best of Jimmy Nail is a compilation album by English singer-songwriter and actor Jimmy Nail, released in 1997 by East West Records. It contains selected singles and tracks from Nail's first five studio albums—Take It or Leave It (1986), Growing Up in Public (1992), Crocodile Shoes (1994), Big River (1995), and Crocodile Shoes II (1996)—plus a Nail-sung song from the soundtrack to the film Evita (1996) (in which Nail played the role of Agustín Magaldi), as well as two new tracks. One of the new tracks, "Black and White", was released as single, reaching number 76 in the UK singles chart in October 1997.

== Track listing ==
No.	Title	Writer(s)	Original album	Length
1.	"Love Don't Live Here Anymore"	Miles Gregory	Take It or Leave It	3:56
2.	"Ain't No Doubt"	Jimmy Nail; Guy Pratt; Danny Schogger; Charlie Dore	Growing Up in Public	4:07
3.	"Crocodile Shoes"	Tony McAnaney	Crocodile Shoes	4:16
4.	"Cowboy Dreams"	Paddy McAloon	Crocodile Shoes	3:32
5.	"Big River"	Nail	Big River	6:00
6.	"Country Boy"	Nail	Crocodile Shoes II	3:38
7.	"Blue Roses"	McAloon	Crocodile Shoes II	3:16
8.	"On This Night of a Thousand Stars"	Andrew Lloyd Webber; Tim Rice	Evita (soundtrack)	1:50
9.	"Running Man"	Nail	Crocodile Shoes II	3:41
10.	"Love"	John Lennon	Big River	4:03
11.	"Once Upon a Time"	Nail	Crocodile Shoes	2:57
12.	"Dragons"	McAloon	Crocodile Shoes	3:47
13.	"Absent Friends"	Nail; Pratt; Schogger	Growing Up in Public	4:13
14.	"Calling Out Your Name"	Nail	Crocodile Shoes	3:35
15.	"Show Me Heaven"	Nail	new track	5:03
16.	"Black and White" (featuring Ranking Roger)	Earl Robinson; David I. Arkin	new track	3:05

== Personnel ==
Adapted from the liner notes for The Nail File: The Best of Jimmy Nail and corresponding studio albums.

=== Musicians ===
- Jimmy Nail – vocals (all tracks), harmonica (track 3), organ solo (track 4)
- Trevor Brewis – drums (tracks 3, 4)
- Marcus Brown – accordion (tracks 3, 4, 11), keyboards (track 4), organ (track 14), piano (track 14), percussion (track 4), backing vocals (track 3), string arrangements (tracks 3, 4, 12), drum programming (track 14)
- Hugh Burns – acoustic guitar (track 5)
- Andy Caine – acoustic guitar (track 10), backing vocals (tracks 5, 6, 9)
- Phil Caffrey – backing vocals (track 14)
- Guy Chambers – piano (tracks 5, 10)
- Alan Clark – organ (tracks 5, 7, 9)
- B. J. Cole – pedal steel guitar (tracks 3, 14)
- David Cullen – additional orchestrations (track 8)
- Danny Cummings – tambourine (track 14), percussion (track 12)
- Martin Ditcham – percussion (tracks 6, 7, 9)
- Melvin Duffy – pedal steel guitar (tracks 5, 7, 9, 10)
- Geoff Dugmore – drums (tracks 4, 5, 10, 12), percussion (tracks 5, 10, 12)
- Frank Gibbon – backing vocals (track 3)
- John Giblin – bass guitar (track 12)
- Gary Husband – drums (tracks 6, 7, 9)
- Chester Kamen – electric guitar (track 10)
- Mark Knopfler – lead guitar (track 5)
- George Lamb – backing vocals (track 14)
- Andrew Lloyd Webber – orchestrations (track 8)
- Tony McAnaney – guitar (tracks 3, 4, 11, 14), bass guitar (tracks 3, 4, 11, 14), classical guitar (track 12), pedal steel guitar (track 12), harmonica (track 4), bouzouki (track 11)
- Dominic Miller – guitar (track 7), acoustic guitar (track 9), electric guitar (track 9)
- Tessa Niles – backing vocals (track 5)
- Fionn O'Lochlainn – bass guitar (tracks 5, 10), mandolin (tracks 6, 9)
- Pino Palladino – bass guitar (tracks 7, 9)
- Phil Palmer – guitar (track 12)
- Rick Parfitt – guitar (track 1)
- Ranking Roger – featured artist (track 16)
- Jackie Rawe – backing vocals (track 6)
- Juliet Roberts – backing vocals (track 6)
- Steve Robson – piano (track 7), keyboards (track 6), synth bass (track 6), clarinet (track 3), fiddle (track 11), ocarina (track 11)
- Danny Schogger – synthesiser (tracks 5, 10), Rhodes piano (track 9)
- Beverley Skeete – backing vocals (track 6)
- Paul Smith – drums (track 11), percussion (track 11)
- James Stevenson – guitar (tracks 6, 7, 9)
- Dave Taggart – backing vocals (tracks 3, 11, 14)
- Roger Taylor – drums (track 1)
- Geoff Whitehorn – guitar (tracks 6, 9)
- Paul "Wix" Wickens – keyboards (track 12)
- Paul "Tubbs" Williams – backing vocals (track 6)

=== Technical ===
- Jimmy Nail – producer (tracks 2–7, 9–14)
- John Allinson – assistant engineer (tracks 2, 11, 13, 14)
- David Caddick – producer (track 8)
- Brad Davis – additional recording engineer (tracks 2, 11, 13, 14)
- Geoff Foster – assistant engineer (track 6)
- Dylan Gallagher – engineer (tracks 2, 11, 13, 14)
- Sam Gibson – assistant engineer (tracks 5, 6, 10)
- Tarquin Gotch – music supervisor (tracks 3, 4, 12)
- Ricky Graham – assistant engineer (track 6)
- Simon Hurrell – engineer (tracks 15, 16)
- Cameron Jenkins – engineer (tracks 5, 10)
- Emma Kamen – music supervisor (tracks 3, 4, 12)
- Jon Kelly – producer (track 12), mixing (tracks 2–7, 9–14)
- Dick Lewzey – engineer (track 8)
- Andrew Lloyd Webber – producer (track 8)
- Tony McAnaney – producer (tracks 3, 4)
- Madonna – remixing (track 8)
- Guy Massey – assistant engineer (tracks 5, 6, 10)
- Chris Neil – producer (tracks 15, 16)
- Will O'Donovan – assistant engineer (tracks 5, 10)
- Alan Parker – producer (track 8)
- Lee "Millhouse" Philips – assistant engineer (track 6)
- Guy Pratt – producer (tracks 2, 11, 13, 14)
- David Reitzas – engineer (track 8), remixing (track 8)
- David Richards – producer (track 1)
- Steve Robson – producer (tracks 6, 7, 9), engineer (tracks 3, 4, 6, 7, 12)
- Danny Schogger – producer (tracks 2, 5, 10, 11, 13, 14)
- Robin Sellars – engineer (track 8)
- Mark "Spike" Stent – engineer (track 8)
- Graeme Stewart – assistant engineer (tracks 5, 10)
- Danton Supple – assistant engineer (tracks 3, 4, 12)
- Roger Taylor – producer (track 1)
- Nigel Wright – producer (track 8), remixing (track 8)

== Charts ==
Chart performance for The Nail File: The Best of Jimmy Nail
Chart (1997)	Peak position
UK Albums (OCC)	8

== Certifications ==
Region	Certification	Certified units/sales
United Kingdom (BPI)	Gold	100,000^{^}
^{^} Shipments figures based on certification alone.

== Video selection track listing ==
The Nail File: The Best of Jimmy Nail was also released on the VHS videocassette format, including 14 of Nail's music videos and live performances.

No.	Title	Length
1.	"Love Don't Live Here Anymore" (live)	3:45
2.	"Ain't No Doubt"	4:09
3.	"Laura"	4:25
4.	"Beautiful"	4:40
5.	"Crocodile Shoes"	4:16
6.	"Cowboy Dreams"	3:11
7.	"Calling Out Your Name"	3:32
8.	"Only One Heart"	3:44
9.	"Big River"	5:45
10.	"Love"	4:01
11.	"Country Boy"	3:36
12.	"Dragons" (live)	3:45
13.	"Blue Roses"	3:17
14.	"Black & White"	3:05
