= Dmitri Matheny =

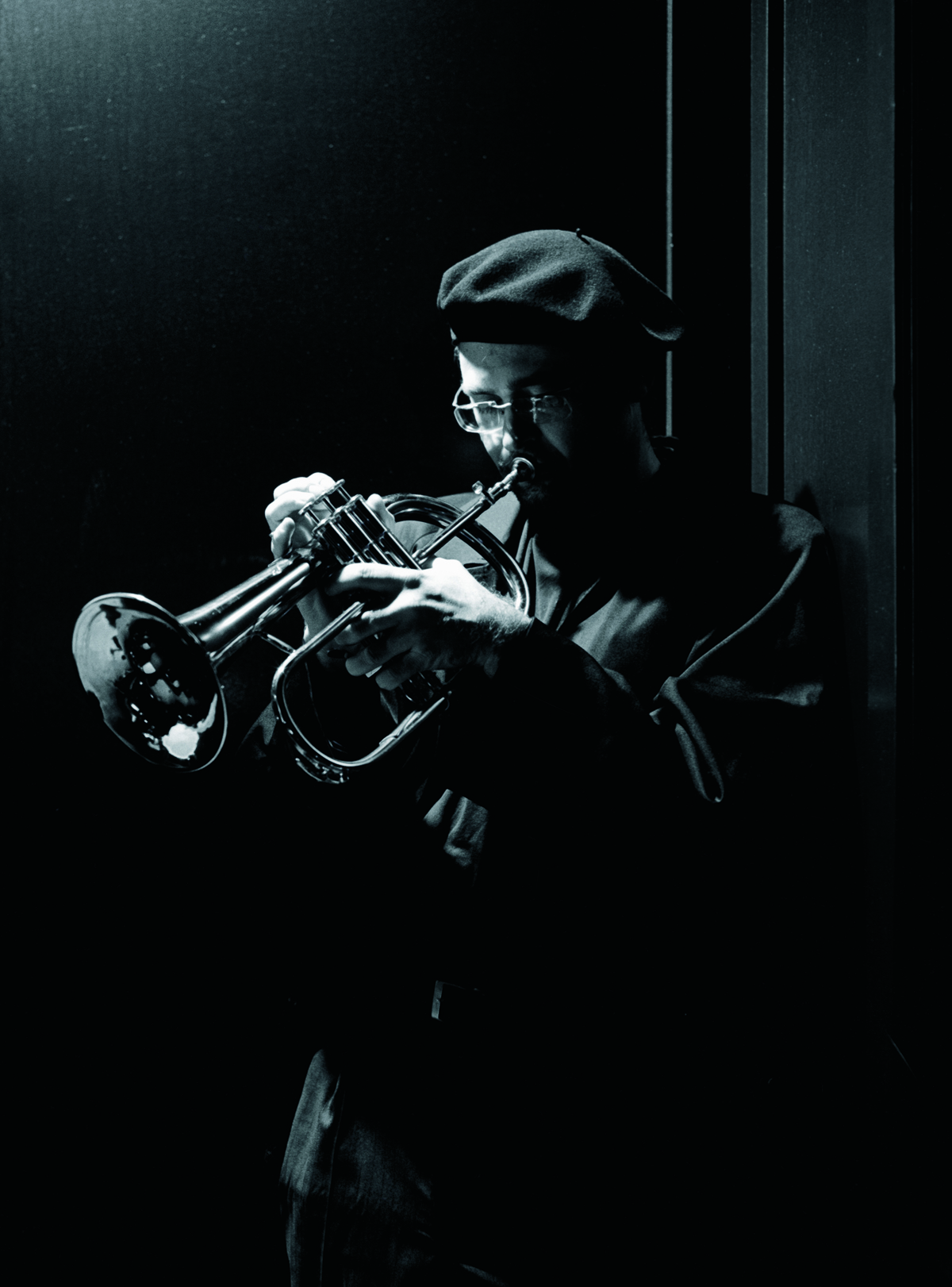

Background information
- Born: December 25, 1965; Nashville, Tennessee, U.S.
- Genres: Jazz
- Occupation: Musician
- Instrument: Flugelhorn

Dmitri Matheny (born December 25, 1965) is an American jazz flugelhornist. According to the San Francisco Chronicle, Matheny is "one of the jazz world's most talented horn players."

== Early career ==
Matheny was raised in Columbus, Georgia, and Tucson, Arizona. He began playing piano at age 5 and switched to trumpet at age 9 while at the Brookstone School in Columbus. At age 12, his family relocated to Tucson, where he played in his school band program. He led his first group at 16 and received funding from the Tucson Jazz Society to continue his studies. In 1983–84 Matheny attended the Interlochen Arts Academy in Michigan and from 1984–89 Berklee College of Music in Boston.

Matheny performed regularly in the Boston area in 1987–88 with the True Colors Big Band led by composer Ken Schaphorst, and in 1988 with the non-profit Jazz Composers Alliance. From 1985-89 Matheny led the New Voice Jazz Sextet, a band which included at different times saxophonists Mark Gross, Antonio Hart, bassist Peter Herbert, and drummer Hans Schuman, founder of JazzReach.

Matheny began his career playing trumpet, studying for a time with noted New York brass teacher Carmine Caruso, but in the late 1980s he began focusing on the flugelhorn as his primary instrument. He began studying with jazz flugelhornist Art Farmer in 1988.

== San Francisco ==
After moving to San Francisco in 1989, Matheny formed the Dmitri Matheny Group and began performing in the Bay Area. During his early years in San Francisco, Matheny also worked in administrative roles for the San Francisco Jazz Festival.

Matheny's annual home season of concerts were a fixture of the Bay Area jazz scene while he lived there. The year 2000 was a typical home season, in which Matheny shared the stage with the Del Sol String Quartet, pianist Amina Figarova, and vocalist Ann Dyer and hosting a benefit performance at Yoshi's for the University of California, Berkeley-based Young Musicians Program, entitled "Diva Night: International Sirens of Song" and featuring Figarova, vocalist Kim Nalley and Claudia Villela performing with the Dmitri Matheny Orchestra.

Mathey has worked with Larry Coryell, Nathan Davis, Amina Figarova, Tommy Flanagan, Wycliffe Gordon, Larry Grenadier, John Handy, Billy Higgins, Red Holloway, Denise Jannah, James Moody, Tony Reedus, Martha Reeves, Sam Rivers, Max Roach, Dennis Rowland, the Rosenberg Trio, Bobby Rydell, Bud Shank, Shea Marshall, Sonny Simmons, Mary Stallings, Billy Taylor, Bobby Watson, and Paula West.

Notable Bay Area clubs in which Matheny has performed include Yoshi's, Cafe Du Nord, and the Kuumbwa Jazz Center in Santa Cruz.

Among Matheny's many festival appearances are the Berkeley Jazz Festival (1999), Big Sur Jazz Festival (1997), Britt Festival (2001), Caspian Jazz & Blues Festival, Azerbaijan (2002), Monterey Jazz Festival (1989, 1996, 1999, 2004), North Beach Jazz Festival (2000, 2001), Redlands Bowl Summer Music Festival (2002, 2010), San Francisco Jazz Festival (1997, 1998, 2004, 2005), Telluride Jazz Celebration (1996, 1997, 1998, 1999, 2000, 2001, 2010) and Thelonious Monk Institute Colony at Jazz Aspen Snowmass (1997, 1998, 1999).

Matheny performed as guest jazz soloist with the Dallas Symphony Orchestra on November 21, 1998 and the San Francisco Symphony on March 17, 2001. He has also worked with the San Francisco Symphony's "Adventures in Music" program.

== Recordings ==
=== Monarch Records ===
In the early 1990s, Matheny moved to San Francisco. In 1995 he signed a contract with Monarch Records. The label released Matheny's first album as a leader, Red Reflections, that year. The album was a mixture of standards and Matheny's compositions that featured performances by saxophonists Rob Scheps and Dave Ellis, guitarist John Heller, bassists Bill Douglass and Trevor Dunn, drummers Scott Amendola and Alan Jones, and percussionist Ian Dogole. An album release concert for Red Reflections took place at Carnegie Hall's Weill Recital Hall in February 1996.

The following year Matheny released his second album, Penumbra: The Moon Sessions. The album the moon as a theme and inspiration and featured saxophonist Dave Ellis, guitarist John Heller, bassist Bill Douglass, drummer Kenny Wollesen, and accordionist Rob Burger. Penumbra, produced by noted jazz producer Orrin Keepnews was named one of the Ten Best Jazz Recordings of 1996 by Jazziz magazine. The San Francisco Bay Guardian called Penumbra the Best Jazz Recording of 1996.

Matheny's third album for Monarch Records, Starlight Cafe (1998), was recorded live at the JazzSchool in Berkeley, California, with a pared down lineup of pianist Darrell Grant and bassist Bill Douglass. Starlight Cafe was named one of the Top 10 Jazz Recordings of the Year by the Oakland Tribune. Matheny and Grant played a Starlight Cafe release concert at Weill Recital Hall in October 1998.

=== Papillon Records ===
Matheny's follow up to Starlight Cafe was the Christmas album Santa's Got a Brand New Bag (Papillon, 2000). It featured vocalists Brenda Boykin, Clairdee, and Paula West, accordionist Rob Burger, French horn player Mark Taylor, tenor and soprano saxophonist Kenny Brooks, guitarists Brad Buethe and Benjamin Rodefer, pianists Darrell Grant and Bill Bell, bassists Ruth Davies, and drummers Jason Lewis and Eddie Marshall.

Nocturne (2005) in some ways echoed the tone and settings of 1997's Penumbra. Andrew Gilbert, writing for The San Diego Union-Tribune, said of Nocturne, "Matheny draws on the European classical tradition of night-inspired musical settings, from Mozart and Schumann to Chopin and Debussy ... the pieces are mostly composed ... Starting with "Twilight," the album moves through a 12-movement cycle that concludes with the gentle "Awakening". The album featured guitarist Brad Buethe, bassist Ruth Davies, percussionist Deszon X. Claiborne, violinists Jeremy Cohen and Sarah Knutson, violist Emily Onderdonk, cellist Marika Hughes, saxophonist Charles McNeal, harpist Karon Gottlieb and Bart Platteau on shakuhachi.

The SnowCat is a secular holiday offering based on the ancient Asian parable of "the Oxherder" in which a herd boy's quest to find his missing ox is compared to an individual's journey through life. Indian in origin, the parable became popular in medieval Japan and was depicted on 13th century scrolls as the "Ten Oxherding Songs" or Ten Oxherding Pictures. The scrolls traditionally divide the hero's journey into ten stages, each illustrated by a circularly framed image and a simple verse. Rendered in the graphic style of Japanese narrative illustration, the story format is as simple as a modern comic or coloring book. In Matheny's version of the tale, the hero is changed from a boy to a girl, and her companion is not an ox but a cat. Matheny serves as storyteller and flugelhornist on the recording, which is often performed in concert. Also performing are vocalist Zoe Ellis, saxophonist Charles McNeal, guitarist Brad Buethe, bassist Ruth Davies, and drummer Deszon X. Claiborne.

Spirito Sanctu: The New Millennium Mass is a seventeen-movement liturgical work commissioned as part of San Francisco's millennial New Year's Eve celebration. The composition received its world premiere at San Francisco's St. Dominic's Catholic Church at midnight on December 31, 1999. The premiere was recorded live and released on Papillon Records in 2007. Spirito Sanctu was scored for chorus, organ, percussion, brass quintet, jazz ensemble, and gospel soloist, with the Mass conducted by David Schofield. Among the performers featured were vocalist Clairdee, keyboardist Matthew Clark, bassist Ruth Davies, percussionist Curt Moore, the San Francisco Brass, and the St. Dominic's Choir.

In 2008, Papillon Records released Best of Dmitri Matheny, a compilation of tracks that had appeared previously in his discography, save one: a brief jump style arrangement of "Take Me Out to the Ball Game." In 2010, Matheny Papillon Records released Grant & Matheny, Dmitri's duo collaboration with pianist Darrell Grant. The album was the first commercial release by the duo, who have performed together extensively since 1998. The recording features Vincent Youmans' "Without a Song", Thelonious Monk's "Think of One", and Keith Jarrett's "Country" in addition to original works.

=== Origin Records ===
In 2022, Origin Records released CASCADIA, a tribute to the Pacific Northwest. The album received a 4-star review from All About Jazz. Critic Dan McClenaghan said of the record,"The theme - aside from Matheny's home in the Northwest - seems to be pure beauty."

== Film music ==
Three of Matheny's recordings of his compositions, "Penumbra," "Moon Rocks" and "Red Reflections," were used on the soundtrack to the RKO Pictures feature film Shade (2003), starring Gabriel Byrne, Jamie Foxx, Melanie Griffith, and Sylvester Stallone.

Matheny's film scoring and soundtrack credits include the documentary Mary, Paradox & Grace (PBS, 1996), the industrial short film Greenhorn Creek (1997), the San Francisco Museum of Modern Art production Voices & Images of California Art (1997). He also contributed music for the Cannes Film Festival premiere of Stanley's Girlfriend a short film from the horror anthology Trapped Ashes (2006).

== Producing ==
Matheny produced a number of recordings for Monarch Records in the 1990s. Since first studying with jazz flugelhornist Art Farmer in the late 1980s, Matheny had developed a close relationship with the noted jazz musician and fellow Arizonan. In 1997, Matheny served as Executive Producer of Farmer's recording, Live at the Stanford Jazz Workshop. He also wrote the liner notes for the critically well-received CD.

== Collaborations ==
Matheny has collaborated frequently with pianist Amina Figarova. As a member of her Amina Figarova International Band Matheny performed in Europe, Asia and North America between 1998 and 2006. Matheny's most frequent collaborator is pianist Darrell Grant. The two have performed together on numerous occasions and in a variety of settings, from classrooms to the Monterey Jazz Festival as the duo Grant & Matheny.

== Education ==
Matheny regularly presents clinics, lectures, master classes and workshops at the university level. He has also staged more than 500 free, curriculum-based concerts for children; a total audience of over 50,000. Matheny has held teaching faculty and management positions with the Jazzschool, Boston Center for the Arts, Chabot Space and Science Center, and the Stanford Jazz Workshop. He has also served as Director of Education for SFJAZZ, as Assistant Education Director for the Thelonious Monk Institute Jazz Colony at Jazz Aspen Snowmass, and as Artist-In-Residence for the Siskiyou Institute of Ashland and the Young Musicians Program of the University of California, Berkeley.

== Awards and honors ==
In 1998, Matheny was selected as Talent Deserving Wider Recognition in the 46th Annual Down Beat magazine Critics' Poll. In 1999, he was named a Best New Artist by Jazziz magazine with pianist Brad Mehldau, vibraphonist Stefon Harris, and saxophonist Ravi Coltrane. He was named one of the Bay Area Best by the San Francisco Examiner magazine in 1997, 1998, and 2000. Also in 2000, he was recognized for Outstanding Service to Jazz Education by the International Association for Jazz Education. In 2016, Matheny was named NW Jazz Instrumentalist of the Year by Earshot Jazz.

Matheny has received commissions and premieres from Meet the Composer, the Manhattan New Music Project, the American Society of Composers Authors and Publishers, the Bay Area Jazz Composers Orchestra, and 20th Century Forum.

== Discography ==
=== As leader ===
- 1995 Red Reflections (Monarch)
- 1996 Penumbra: The Moon Sessions (Monarch)
- 1998 Starlight Cafe [live] (Monarch)
- 2000 Santa's Got a Brand New Bag (Papillon)
- 2005 Nocturne (Papillon)
- 2006 The SnowCat (Papillon)
- 2007 Spiritu Sancto: The New Millennium Mass (Papillon)
- 2008 Best of Dmitri Matheny (Papillon)
- 2010 Grant & Matheny (with Darrell Grant) (Papillon)
- 2014 Sagebrush Rebellion (Papillon/BluePort)
- 2016 Jazz Noir (Papillon/BluePort)
- 2022 CASCADIA (Origin)

=== As sideman ===
- Janice Jarrett Blue Nights & Sunshower (Anjana, 2011)
- Don Pender Birth of the Cool Revisited (2008)
- Martan Mann Le Petit Concert (Jazzical, 2005)
- Ron Kaplan Lounging Around (Kapland, 1999)
- Ron Kaplan Dedicated (Kapland 2004)
- Ron Kaplan Retro (Kapland, 2014)
- Clairdee Destination Moon (Declare, 1999)
- Clairdee This Christmas (Declare, 2002)
- Cathi Walkup Living in a Daydream (Flying Weasel, 1999)
- Cathi Walkup Playing Favorites (Flying Weasel, 2002)
- Jacintha Lush Life (Groove Note, 2001)
- Nika Rejto Midnight Kiss (Unika, 2002)
- Nika Rejto Bridge Weaver (Unika, 1998)
- Amina Figarova Jazz at the Pinehill: Live in Europe, Vol. 1 (Munich, 2001)
- Amina Figarova Jazz at the Pinehill: Live in Europe, Vol. 2 (Munich, 2001)
- Safari Safari (2001)
- Ian Dogole & Global Fusion Night Harvest (Global Fusion, 2000)
- Ian Dogole & Global Fusion Ionospheres (Cei, 1997)
- Birdland Express Passion Fire (2000)
- Five Voices Quint-Essential (2000)
- The Crown Project Gershwin on Monarch (Monarch, 1998)
- The Crown Project Modern Mancini (Monarch, 1999)
- Dave Ellis In the Long Run (Monarch, 1998)
- Daria Just the Beginning (Jazz'M Up, 1997)
- Yehudit Yehudit (Edgetone, 1997)
- Ken Schaphorst Big Band Making Lunch (Accurate, 1989)
