= Santa's Got a Brand New Bag =

Fourth album by American flugelhornist Dmitri Matheny

Studio album by Dmitri Matheny
- Released: November 1, 2000
- Genre: Jazz
- Label: Papillon

Dmitri Matheny chronology
| Starlight Cafe (1998) | Santa's Got a Brand New Bag (2000) | Nocturne (2005) |

Santa's Got a Brand New Bag, the fourth album by American flugelhornist Dmitri Matheny, is a collection of Christmas songs released in 2000.

== Description ==
This collection of Christmas songs by jazz flugelhornist, Dmitri Matheny, was released in 2000, and features vocalists Paula West, Clairdee and Brenda Boykin. The album was recorded in San Francisco, California and released on Papillon Records. The Monterey County Herald's review said of the record, "Matheny’s warm tone, playful nature and lyrical sensibilities add an extra dimension to this collection of holiday tunes."

== Track listing ==
| No. | Title | Writer(s) | Length |
|---|---|---|---|
| 1. | "Santa Claus Is Coming to Town" | Haven Gillespie and J. Fred Coots | 3:09 |
| 2. | "Santa Baby" | Anthony Fred Springer, Joan Javits, Philip Springer | 3:59 |
| 3. | "God Rest Ye Merry, Gentlemen" | Traditional | 7:15 |
| 4. | "Winter Wonderland" | D. Smith, F. Bernard | 3:41 |
| 5. | "White Christmas" | Irving Berlin | 5:04 |
| 6. | "Here Comes Santa Claus" | Traditional | 3:52 |
| 7. | "You're A Mean One, Mr. Grinch" | Albert Hague | 4:23 |
| 8. | "Let It Snow! Let It Snow! Let It Snow!" | Sammy Cahn and Jule Styne | 3:24 |
| 9. | "O Come All Ye Faithful" | Traditional | 5:00 |
| 10. | "Have Yourself A Merry Little Christmas" | Hugh Martin and Ralph Blane | 4:37 |
| 11. | "The Christmas Song" | Mel Tormé and Robert Wells | 1:30 |

== Personnel ==
- Dmitri Matheny, flugelhorn
- Brenda Boykin, vocals
- Clairdee, vocals
- Paula West, vocals
- Kenny Brooks, tenor and soprano saxophones
- Rob Burger, accordion
- Mark Taylor, French horn
- Brad Buethe, guitar
- Benjamin Rodefer, guitar
- Darrell Grant, piano
- Bill Bell, piano
- Ruth Davies, bass
- Jason Lewis, drums
- Eddie Marshall, drums
