= Spiritu Sancto =

Seventh album by American flugelhornist Dmitri Matheny

Studio album by Dmitri Matheny
- Released: January 1, 2007
- Genre: Jazz
- Label: Papillon

Dmitri Matheny chronology
The SnowCat (2006)	Spiritu Sancto (2007)	Grant & Matheny (2010)

Spiritu Sancto, the seventh album by American flugelhornist Dmitri Matheny, was released in 2007.

== Description ==
Spiritu Sancto ("The New Millennium Mass") is a complete liturgical work of seventeen movements, drawing on jazz, gospel, choral, orchestral and world music traditions. The piece was commissioned by Ted W. Hall and St. Domenic's Church in San Francisco in 1999 as part of the city's millennial New Year's Eve celebration, the composition received its world premiere on December 31, 1999 at the stroke of midnight at St. Domenic's Church. The performance was recorded live by producer, Lolly Lewis, and Grammy-award winning recording engineer, Phil Edwards and released on Papillon Records in 2007. The work was composed by Dmitri Matheny and conducted by Dr. David Schofield, with lyrics for the Offertory (I'm Ready) contributed by Ted W. Hall.

== Track listing ==
No.	Title	Writer(s)	Length
1.	"Prelude (Whisper, Muse)"	Dmitri Matheny	2:41
2.	"Processional I (Slow)"	Dmitri Matheny	2:35
3.	"Processional II (Medium)"	Dmitri Matheny	:54
4.	"Processional III (Fast)"	Dmitri Matheny	1:11
5.	"Processional IV (Slow)"	Dmitri Matheny	2:14
6.	"Kyrie"	Dmitri Matheny	6:08
7.	"Gloria"	Dmitri Matheny	5:21
8.	"Responsorial Psalm"	Dmitri Matheny	2:14
9.	"Alleluia Fanfare"	Dmitri Matheny	2:26
10.	"Offertory (I'm Ready)"	Dmitri Matheny	2:36
11.	"Interlude (I'm Ready Instrumental)"	Dmitri Matheny	2:25
12.	"Sanctus"	Dmitri Matheny	4:20
13.	"Memorial Acclamation"	Dmitri Matheny	1:30
14.	"Agnus Dei"	Dmitri Matheny	3:32
15.	"Communion Canticle"	Dmitri Matheny	4:06
16.	"Interlude (Agnus Dei)"	Dmitri Matheny	2:26
17.	"Recessional"	Dmitri Matheny	3:26

== Personnel ==
- Dmitri Matheny, flugelhorn
- Clairdee, vocal soloist
- Matthew Clark, piano and organ
- Ruth Davies, doublebass
- Curt Moore, drums and percussion
- The San Francisco Brass
- St. Dominic's Choir
