= Mark Taylor (French horn) =

American musician

Mark Thomas Taylor (born May 22, 1961, Chattanooga, Tennessee) is an American jazz French horn player and composer.

Taylor studied horn formally in his youth and took a bachelor's degree in music at the University of Tennessee, where he studied under Jerry Coker. He moved to Boston and continued his studies at the New England Conservatory of Music (1988-1990), playing during this time with Jimmy Giuffre, Max Roach, Oliver Lake, Sam Rivers, Abdullah Ibrahim, Muhal Richard Abrams, and Orange Then Blue (including for international tours). He also performed with Max Roach's brass quintet, So What Brass 5, which was active through the 1990s. In the 1990s he worked with Henry Threadgill's Very Very Circus, Lester Bowie, Ken Filiano, Matt Wilson, Lafayette Harris, Myra Melford, Fred Hopkins, and Grover Mitchell.

== Discography ==
=== As leader ===
- Circle Squared (Mark Taylor, 2002)
- At What Age (Artists Recording Collective, 2011)
- QuietLand (Mapleshade Records, 1997)
- Live At The Freight (with Jessica Jones, New Artists 2011)

=== As sideman ===
With Anthony Braxton

- Trillium E (New Braxton House, 2011)
- Two Compositions 2007 (New Braxton House, 2011)
- Creative Music Orchestra 2011 (New Braxton House, 2012)
- Two Compositions (Orchestra) 2005 (New Braxton House, 2013)

With Henry Threadgill

- Too Much Sugar for a Dime (Axiom, 1993)
- Carry the Day (Columbia, 1995)
- Makin' a Move (Columbia, 1995)

With others

- Muhal Richard Abrams, Blu Blu Blu (Black Saint, 1991)
- Michael Bolton, This Is the Time (Columbia, 1996)
- Cecil Bridgewater, I Love Your Smile (Bluemoon, 1992)
- Gigi, Gigi (Palm Pictures, 2001)
- Joseph Daley, The Seven Deadly Sins (Jaro, 2010)
- Oliver Lake, Otherside (Gramavision, 1988)
- Grover Mitchell, Hip Shakin' (Ken Music, 1990)
- James Morrison, Live at the Sydney Opera House (Warner, 1996)
- Orange Then Blue, While You Were Out (GM, 1994)
- Ken Schaphorst, Making Lunch (Accurate/JCA, 1989)
- Gunther Schuller, Jumpin' in the Future (GM, 1988)
- Alan Silva, Alan Silva & the Sound Visions Orchestra (Eremite, 2001)
- Warren Smith, Race Cards (Freedom Art, 2003)
- Warren Smith, Natural/Cultural Forces (Engine Studios, 2007)
- BeBe Winans, BeBe Winans (Atlantic, 1997)
- Dmitri Matheny, Santa's Got a Brand New Bag (Papillion, 2000)
