= Growing Up in Public =

Growing Up in Public may refer to:

- Growing Up in Public (Lou Reed album), 1980
- Growing Up in Public (Jimmy Nail album), 1992
- Growing Up in Public (Professor Green album), 2014
