= Red Reflections =

Debut album by American flugelhornist Dmitri Matheny

Studio album by Dmitri Matheny
- Released: October 12, 1995
- Genre: Jazz

Dmitri Matheny chronology
| Red Reflections (1995) | Penumbra: The Moon Sessions (1996) |

Red Reflections is the debut album by American flugelhornist Dmitri Matheny, released in 1995. It was Matheny's first album as a leader, having first appeared on 1989's Making Lunch by the Ken Schaphorst Big Band.

== Production ==
Red Reflections was recorded June 1994, and March, April and August 1995, at Banquet Sound Studios, Santa Rosa, California. Produced by Ian Dogole, the album was released by Monarch Records (MR-1009) and mastered by George Horn at Fantasy Records.

== Description ==
Red Reflections is made up of five original compositions and two pieces by Horace Silver and Michael Brecker. The CD ranked in the national Gavin Top 40 and the CMJ jazz radio charts. It was listed as one of the Top 10 Recordings of 1995 by JazzIz Magazine, who called the album, "an intricate, colorful, slowly whirling vortex that draws you in deeper with each listen. Smooth yet always intense, no matter what mood or tempo."

== Track listing ==
| No. | Title | Writer(s) | Length |
|---|---|---|---|
| 1. | "Red Reflections" | Dmitri Matheny | 9:00 |
| 2. | "Kuumbwa Blues" | Dmitri Matheny | 6:20 |
| 3. | "Like a River" | Dmitri Matheny | 7:02 |
| 4. | "Sketch" | Dmitri Matheny | 12:39 |
| 5. | "The Outlaw" | Horace Silver | 5:33 |
| 6. | "Myth of the Rainy Night" | Dmitri Matheny | 7:37 |
| 7. | "Take a Walk" | Michael Brecker | 9:27 |

== Personnel ==
- Dmitri Matheny, flugelhorn
- Dave Ellis, tenor saxophone
- Rob Scheps, tenor saxophone
- John Heller, guitar
- Trevor Dunn, bass
- Bill Douglass, bass
- Scott Amendola, drums
- Alan Jones, drums
- Ian Dogole, Nigerian udu
