= Sagebrush Rebellion (album) =

Ninth album by American flugelhornist Dmitri Matheny

Live album by Dmitri Matheny
- Released: January 1, 2014
- Genre: Jazz
- Label: Papillon

Dmitri Matheny chronology
Grant & Matheny (2010)	Sagebrush Rebellion (2014)	Jazz Noir (2016)

Sagebrush Rebellion, the ninth album by American flugelhornist Dmitri Matheny, was released in 2014.

== Description ==
Sagebrush Rebellion, Dmitri Matheny's tenth album as a leader, was recorded live at Dizzy's in San Diego, California on November 29, 2013. The album was produced by Dmitri Matheny and engineered by Jim Merod. It was released in 2014 on Papillon Records. The album is dedicated to flugelhornist Art Farmer.

== Track listing ==
No.	Title	Writer(s)	Length
1.	"It Could Happen To You"	Jimmy van Heusen and Johnny Burke	7:26
2.	"Petite Belle"	Art Farmer	8:13
3.	"Hit The Brakes"		7:01
4.	"Here's Looking At You"	Charlie Haden	7:13
5.	"Little Jimmy Fiddler"	Dmitri Matheny	5:55
6.	"Warm Valley"	Duke Ellington	9:47
7.	"One For Daddy-O"	Nat Adderley	6:31
8.	"Red Reflections"	Dmitri Matheny	6:23
9.	"Sagebrush Rebellion"	Dmitri Matheny	6:27

== Personnel ==
- Dmitri Matheny, flugelhorn
- Nick Manson, piano
- Justin Grinnell, bass
- Duncan Moore, drums
