= Nocturne (Dmitri Matheny album) =

Fifth album by American flugelhornist Dmitri Matheny

Studio album by Dmitri Matheny
- Released: July 1, 2005
- Genre: Jazz
- Label: Papillon

Dmitri Matheny chronology
| Santa's Got a Brand New Bag (2000) | Nocturne (2005) | The SnowCat (2006) |

Nocturne, the fifth album by American flugelhornist Dmitri Matheny, was released in 2005.

== Description ==
Flugelhornist Dmitri Matheny is recorded here with strings on 12 original compositions. Nocturne was released in 2005 on the Papillon recording label. The San Diego Tribune said of the album, "A protege of the late trumpet great Art Farmer, [Dmitri Matheny] has carved out a singular niche as a player and composer by honing a chamber jazz aesthetic, a sensibility open to far-flung influences and instruments."

== Track listing ==
| No. | Title | Writer(s) | Length |
|---|---|---|---|
| 1. | "Twilight" | Dmitri Matheny | 2:31 |
| 2. | "Dragon Dance" | Dmitri Matheny | 2:25 |
| 3. | "Whisper, Muse" | Dmitri Matheny | 3:01 |
| 4. | "Emerald Buddha" | Dmitri Matheny | 2:23 |
| 5. | "Longing" | Dmitri Matheny | 1:10 |
| 6. | "Like a River" | Dmitri Matheny | 3:43 |
| 7. | "Myth of the Rainy Night" | Dmitri Matheny | 2:22 |
| 8. | "Sea of Tranquility" | Dmitri Matheny | 2:20 |
| 9. | "Red Reflections" | Dmitri Matheny | 3:22 |
| 10. | "Nocturne" | Dmitri Matheny | 4:21 |
| 11. | "Penumbra" | Dmitri Matheny | 3:40 |
| 12. | "Awakening" | Dmitri Matheny | 1:32 |

== Personnel ==
- Dmitri Matheny, flugelhorn
- Brad Buethe, guitars
- Ruth Davies, bass
- Deszon X. Claiborne, percussion
- Jeremy Cohen, violin
- Sarah Knutson, violin
- Emily Onderdonk, viola
- Marika Hughes, cello
- Charles McNeal, saxophones
- Bart Platteau, shakuhachi
- Karen Gottlieb, harp
