= The SnowCat =

Sixth album by American flugelhornist Dmitri Matheny

Studio album by Dmitri Matheny
- Released: January 7, 2006
- Genre: Jazz
- Label: Papillon

Dmitri Matheny chronology
Nocturne (2005)	The SnowCat (2006)	Spiritu Sancto (2007)

The SnowCat, the sixth album by American flugelhornist Dmitri Matheny, was released in 2006.

== Description ==
The SnowCat is Dmitri Matheny’s original musical theater production for kids and families based on the ancient Asian parable of "the Oxherder" in which a herd boy's quest to find his missing ox is compared to an individual's journey through life. The CD was released in 2006 on Papillon Records.

== Track listing ==
No.	Title	Writer(s)	Length
1.	"Overture"	Dmitri Matheny	1:45
2.	"Sam's Search"	Dmitri Matheny	3:26
3.	"Cat Tracks"	Dmitri Matheny	3:49
4.	"SnowCat Theme"	Dmitri Matheny	3:43
5.	"Cat Dance"	Dmitri Matheny	3:13
6.	"Hush, Now"	Dmitri Matheny	2:42
7.	"Boat Song"	Dmitri Matheny	4:25
8.	"Nocturne (Sam's Dream)"	Dmitri Matheny	2:02
9.	"One Bright Pearl"	Dmitri Matheny	4:12
10.	"Serenity"	Dmitri Matheny	3:25
11.	"SnowCat Reprise"	Dmitri Matheny	1:13
12.	"The SnowCat (Story and Music)"	Dmitri Matheny	35:40

== Personnel ==
- Dmitri Matheny, flugelhorn
- Zoe Ellis, vocals
- Charles McNeal, saxophones
- Brad Buethe, guitars
- Ruth Davies, basses
- Deszon X. Claiborne, drums
