= Crocodile Shoes =

1994 British miniseries starring Jimmy Nail

- Genre: Musical drama
- Created by: Jimmy Nail
- Written by: Jimmy Nail
- Directed by: David Richards; Robert Knights; Malcolm Mowbray; Jimmy Nail (temporary)
- Starring: Jimmy Nail; James Wilby
- Theme music composer: Tony McAnaney
- Opening theme: Crocodile Shoes
- Ending theme: Crocodile Shoes
- Composer: Tony McAnaney
- Original language: English
- No. of series: 2
- No. of episodes: 13

Production
- Executive producers: Jimmy Nail; Linda James; Jen Samson
- Producer: Charlie Hanson
- Editor: Chris Gill
- Running time: 60 mins
- Production companies: Big Boy Productions; Red Rooster

Original release
- Network: BBC1
- Release: 10 November – 22 December 1994

Related
- Crocodile Shoes II

Crocodile Shoes is a British thirteen-part television drama set across two series and was made by the BBC. It was screened on BBC1 in 1994 (Series 1) and in 1996 (Series 2).

The first series, comprising seven episodes, was written by and starred Jimmy Nail as a factory worker who becomes a country and western singer. The show's eponymous theme tune "Crocodile Shoes" became a chart hit for Nail, as did the album of the same name.

A sequel, comprising six episodes, Crocodile Shoes II, followed in 1996 and the theme tune "Country Boy" was a hit for Nail too.

Paddy McAloon of Prefab Sprout supplied five original songs to the two series, all of them recorded by Jimmy Nail.

The series was re-screened on UK channel, Drama, in February 2016.

== Main cast ==
- Jimmy Nail as Jed Shepperd
- James Wilby as Adrian “Ade” Lynn
- Sammy Johnson as Archie Pate
- Melanie Hill as Emma Shepperd
- Amy Madigan as Carmel Cantrell
- Burt Young as Lou Benedetti
- Brian Capron as Rex Hall
- Christopher Fairbank as Alan Clarke
- Alex Kingston as Caroline Carrison
- Elizabeth Carling as Wendy
- John Bowler as Albert Peplo
- Paul Palance as Chrissie "Big Chrissie"
- Berwick Kaler as George
- Peter Wingfield as Danny
- Stuart Greer as Pete
- Ginny Holder as Sue Nbokei

== Crew ==
- Jimmy Nail Scriptwriter, executive Producer
- David Richards Director (Episodes 1–3)
- Robert Knights Director (Episode 4)
- Malcolm Mowbray Director (Episode 5)
- Jen Samson Executive Producer
- Linda James Executive Producer
- Peter Schmidthausen Floor Manager
