= Rob Scheps =

American jazz saxophonist

Rob Scheps (born Eugene, Oregon) began studying tenor saxophone at age nine. He also plays soprano saxophone and flute. Raised on Long Island, New York, Scheps studied at New England Conservatory of Music. While living in the Boston area he formed the True Colors Big Band, which he co-led with Ken Schaphorst. In 1988 he moved to New York, where he formed the Rob Scheps Core-tet and the Bartokking Heads.

A faculty member at the Mannes College of Music, Scheps was Principal Saxophone with the Oregon Symphony for 13 years. He played on the national tour of Porgy and Bess with the Charleston Symphony, and the New York City Opera orchestra for Wonderful Town. His other Broadway credits include CATS and Miss Saigon.

Scheps has performed with Aretha Franklin, Ray Charles, Liza Minnelli, Linda Ronstadt, Dianne Reeves, Buddy Rich, Lionel Hampton, Mel Torme, Arturo Sandoval, Gunther Schuller, Clark Terry, the Gil Evans Orchestra and the Vanguard Jazz Orchestra.

== Discography ==
As a leader:

- Rob Scheps & The TBA Band, Live at the Churchill School (Powder Rhythm), 2021
- Rob Scheps, Comencio (Steeplechase 31866), 2019
- Rob Scheps Core-tet, Live At Smalls (Smalls Records), 2015
- The Rob Scheps Big Band with Greg Gisbert, Our Path To This Moment (CD Baby), 2012

With others:

- Susan Talbot Reid, Bridges to Home (CD Baby), 2018
- Joel Weiskopf, The Message (Steeplechase), 2017
- Jacob Bernz & Jeff Haynes, Can You Hear Me Now, (CD Baby) ,2015
- Dar Williams, Emerald (Bread & Butter Music), 2015
- Ron Carlson, Kind Folk (CD Baby), 2015
- Essiet Okon Essiet, Shona (SpaceTime Records), 2014
- Joel Harrison, Infinite Possibility (Sunnyside), 2013
- Pete Seeger & Jeff Haynes, Storm King, Vol. 1 and 2, (Audio Book), 2013
- Pete Seeger & Lorre Wyatt, A More Perfect Union (Appleseed Recordings), 2012
- Anne Mironchik, Cookin' In The Kitchen (Anne Mironchik), 2010
- Jazz Code, Codes For Christmas (Jazzcode), 2008
- Stephen Palmer and the Alliance, The Alliance (Race Production Records), 2008
- Johnny Rodgers and Liza Minnelli, Let's Make A Date (Melody Thread), 2008
- Jazz Code with Reynolds, Brown, Wadenius, Stormer, In the Moment (Jazzcode), 2007
- Jules and The Family, Border Radio, (Jules and the Family), 2006
- Howard Tate, A Portrait of Howard (Solid Ground), 2006
- Tim Jensen, A Mind for the Scenery (Origin Arts), 2004
- Francois Theberge, Medium Band (Roundrecords) ,2004
- Mario DePriest, First Things First (Viruth), 2001
- Ben Wolfe, Murray’s Cadillac (Amosaya), 2001
- Nancy King, Glen Moore, Rob Scheps, King on the Road (Cardas), 2000
- John Stowell with Rob Scheps, Brazil Project (New Media), 2000
- Magnets! Live at Earshot (Seattle2000), 2000
- Julian Priester & Roswell Rudd with David Haney, Off the Cuff (Cheetah), 1999
- Joan Szymko, Openings (Viriditas), 1998
- Tim Jensen, Tim Jensen (Self Released), 1998
- Various Artists, Bob Moses, Alternate Currents (Gramavision), 1996
- Dmitri Matheny, Red Reflections (Monarch), 1995
- Duffy Jackson, Swing, Swing, Swing (Milestone/Fantasy), 1995
- Bob Moses, Time Stood Still (Gramavision), 1994
- Jazz Composer’s Alliance Orchestra (Sam Rivers and Julius Hemphill) Flux (Northeastern), 1993
- Darrell Katz, Dreamland (Cadence), 1993
- Terumasa Hino with John Scofield, Bluestruck (Blue Note), 1990
- Wayne Naus and Big Band Express, Born on the Road (Nausome), 1987
