= Crocodile Shoes II =

- Created by: Jimmy Nail
- Written by: Jimmy Nail
- Directed by: Baz Taylor; Roger Bamford
- Starring: Jimmy Nail
- Theme music composer: Jimmy Nail
- Original language: English
- No. of seasons: 1
- No. of episodes: 6

Production
- Executive producers: Jimmy Nail; Tarquin Gotch
- Editor: Chris Gill
- Running time: 60 minutes
- Production companies: Big Boy Productions; Red Rooster

Original release
- Network: BBC One
- Release: 14 November – 19 December 1996

Related
- Crocodile Shoes

Crocodile Shoes II is a British six-part television series made by the BBC and screened on BBC One in 1996. The follow-up to Crocodile Shoes, it was written by Jimmy Nail with Nick Mead as script associate.

Where Crocodile Shoes followed Jed Shepperd on his journey from Newcastle to Nashville and all the way back, Crocodile Shoes II showed Jed trying to prove he didn't kill his manager Ade Lynn (James Wilby). During Crocodile Shoes II, Shepperd returns to Newcastle, was sent to prison, became engaged to Wendy, and was nearly killed in an accident. It's unclear why James Wilby is written out of the second series and why Mike Elliott is replaced with another actor.

== Main cast ==
- Jimmy Nail as Jed Shepperd
- Melanie Hill as Emma Shepperd
- Sammy Johnson as Archie Pate
- Sara Stewart as Lucy
- Elizabeth Carling as Wendy
- Christopher Fairbank as Alan Clarke
- John Bowler as Albert Peplo (Pep)
- Kenneth MacDonald as DI McCluskey
- Robert Morgan as Warren Bowles

== Crew ==
- Jimmy Nail writer, creator, executive producer, title music composer
- Nick Mead script associate
- Roger Bamford director
- Baz Taylor director
- Tarquin Gotch executive producer
- Peter Richardson producer
- Hilary Fagg script supervisor
