= Sammy Johnson =

English actor

- Sammy Johnson
- Born: Ronald Samuel Johnson; 14 May 1949; Gateshead, England
- Died: November 1998 (aged 49); Málaga, Spain
- Other name: Ronnie Johnson
- Children: 2

Ronald Samuel Johnson (14 May 1949 – November 1998), known by his stage name Sammy Johnson, was an English actor and musician. His most popular role was playing Stick in the British television detective series Spender, created by Jimmy Nail and set in Tyneside. The Sunday for Sammy charity concert series is held regularly in his memory.

== Early life ==
Known by his friends as "Ronnie", Johnson grew up in Gateshead and lived on the Springwell Estate. He learned to play guitar at a young age.

== Career ==
=== Music and theatre ===
His childhood friend and neighbour was R&B musician Ray Stubbs, with whom he formed the blues trio Pigmeat along with Jim Murray. Pigmeat performed at major festivals in the UK and the Netherlands, as well as the blues club Honeysuckle in Gateshead.

Johnson got his start in acting when he and Stubbs were asked to perform in the panto Dick Whittington at Live Theatre. They were tasked with playing ragtime music and playing the parts of the evil baron's henchmen, Ping and Pong. He applied for Equity membership but they already had a "Ron Johnson", so he chose Sammy Johnson as his stage name instead. He became friends with Tim Healy while they were both performing at Live Theatre in 1973.

He then continued to move between the worlds of acting and music, assembling musicians he met at various theatres to form the Ray Stubbs R&B All Stars. Among the musicians he played with in blues gigs around Newcastle was Jimmy Nail, who became influential in his television career.

=== Television ===
Johnson was cast as Martin Cooper in the second series of Auf Wiedersehen, Pet, working with Jimmy Nail in 1985. He then co-starred as Stick in Spender, a TV police drama which aired on BBC1. Stick was the criminal sidekick of the main character Spender, a police detective played by Jimmy Nail.

Other famous roles he played were in the animated comedy adaptation of VIZ's Sid the Sexist, where he provided the voice of the titular character. He was in ITV's adaptation of Catherine Cookson's The Gambling Man as Victor Pittie. He also appeared in Jimmy Nail's Crocodile Shoes and Crocodile Shoes II as Archie Pate. He played the husband of Gillian Taylforth in the 1998 BBC2 World Cup comedy Lost in France.

Toward the end of his life, he moved to Spain to the Vélez-Málaga area to pursue a career in scriptwriting.

== Death and legacy ==
On 10 November 1998, British newspapers reported that Johnson had been found dead near Cútar, east of Málaga, Spain. He had died while out jogging at age 49. He had been preparing for the Great North Run.

=== Sunday for Sammy ===
In 2000, his friends Tim Healy and Jimmy Nail hosted the first fundraising concert in Newcastle City Hall called Sunday for Sammy, featuring sketches with North East personalities from the worlds of music, comedy, and drama. Following its success, the concert was held biennially until 2020, the resumed in 2026. The fund in memory of Sammy Johnson gives grants to talented young people who want to pursue careers in the performing arts. Regular performers have included performers such as Kevin Whately, Denise Welch, Peter Beardsley, and many others.

In 2025, The Sunday for Sammy Trust was a finalist in the North East Charity Awards. New patrons include Brenda Blethyn and pop star Matty Healy.
