= Penumbra: The Moon Sessions =

Second album by American flugelhornist Dmitri Matheny

Studio album by Dmitri Matheny
- Released: 1997
- Genre: Jazz
- Producer: Orrin Keepnews

Dmitri Matheny chronology
Red Reflections (1995)	Penumbra: The Moon Sessions (1997)	Starlight Cafe (1988)

Penumbra: The Moon Sessions is the second album by American flugelhornist Dmitri Matheny.

Penumbra: The Moon Sessions was recorded September 23 and 24, 1996, at Bay Records in Berkeley, California. The album was produced by noted jazz recording executive Orrin Keepnews and was released on Monarch Records (Monarch 1014).

== Description ==
Dmitri Matheny's 1996 second album is a collection of jazz covers and originals inspired by the Moon. The album received 3-1/2 stars (out of 4) in Downbeat, selection as a Bay City Best in San Francisco Examiner Magazine, ranking in the top 25 on the national Gavin jazz radio chart, and praise as "one of the most gorgeous mainstream jazz recordings of the year" in the San Francisco Bay Guardian.

== Track listing ==
No.	Title	Writer(s)	Length
1.	"Moon Alley"	Tom Harrell	6:59
2.	"Desert Moonlight"	Lee Morgan	6:53
3.	"Moonlight in Vermont"	John Blackburn (lyrics) and Karl Suessdorf (music)	7:23
4.	"Penumbra"	Dmitri Matheny	6:26
5.	"Sea of Tranquility"	Dmitri Matheny	7:06
6.	"Sea of Serenity"	Dmitri Matheny	4:14
7.	"Sea of Fertility"	Dmitri Matheny	6:31
8.	"Autumn Moon"	Traditional	2:06
9.	"Harvest Moon"	Neil Young	4:15
10.	"Moon Rocks (Keepnews Blues)"	Dmitri Matheny	7:03

== Personnel ==
- Dmitri Matheny, flugelhorn
- Dave Ellis, tenor saxophone
- John Heller, guitar
- Rob Burger, accordion
- Bill Douglass, bass and Xiao (Chinese flute)
- Kenny Wollesen, drums.
