= Crocodile Shoes (song) =

1994 single by Jimmy Nail

Single by Jimmy Nail

from the album Crocodile Shoes
- B-side: "Calling Out Your Name (Jed's Demo)"
- Released: 14 November 1994
- Length: 4:11
- Label: EastWest
- Songwriter(s): Tony McAnaney
- Producer(s): Tony McAnaney; Jimmy Nail

Jimmy Nail singles chronology
"Beautiful" (1993)	"Crocodile Shoes" (1994)	"Cowboy Dreams" (1995)

"Crocodile Shoes" is a song by English singer-songwriter and actor Jimmy Nail. It was written by Tony McAnaney and produced by him with Nail for the 1994 British television drama Crocodile Shoes. It also became a chart hit for Nail in the United Kingdom, Ireland, and Sweden in 1994 and 1995. The single is featured on the album of the same name (1994).

== Music video ==
The accompanying music video for "Crocodile Shoes" was directed by Willy Smax and produced by Julian Ludlow for 4D. It was released on 14 November 1994.

== Track listings ==
- 7-inch and cassette single

A. "Crocodile Shoes" – 4:11
B. "Calling Out Your Name (Jed's Demo)" – 3:20

- CD single
1. "Crocodile Shoes" – 4:11
2. "Calling Out Your Name (Jed's Demo)" – 3:20
3. "Once Upon a Time (Jed's Demo)" – 1:54

== Charts ==
=== Weekly charts ===
Chart (1994–1995)	Peak position
Australia (ARIA)	147
Europe (Eurochart Hot 100)	19
Ireland (IRMA)	16
Scotland (OCC)	2
Sweden (Sverigetopplistan)	21
UK Singles (OCC)	4
UK Airplay (Music Week)	8

=== Year-end charts ===
Chart (1994)	Position
UK Singles (OCC)	26

== Certifications ==
Region	Certification	Certified units/sales
United Kingdom (BPI)	Gold	400,000^{^}
^{^} Shipments figures based on certification alone.

== See also ==
- Jimmy Nail discography
