= Grant & Matheny =

Eighth album by American flugelhornist Dmitri Matheny

Studio album by Dmitri Matheny
- Released: June 1, 2010
- Genre: Jazz

Dmitri Matheny chronology
Spiritu Sancto (2007)	Grant & Matheny (2010)	Sagebrush Rebellion (2014)

Grant & Matheny, the eighth album by American flugelhornist Dmitri Matheny, was released in 2010.

== Description ==
Grant & Matheny, released in 2010, is the first recorded album by flugelhornist Dmitri Matheny and pianist Darrell Grant. The duo debuted in 1998 at New York’s Weill Recital Hall at Carnegie Hall. The duo's music is a blend of European chamber music and jazz commonly called "chamber jazz."

== Track listing ==
No.	Title	Writer(s)	Length
1.	"The Crucifixion"	Samuel Barber, arr. Grant/Matheny	4:25
2.	"Think of One"	Thelonious Monk	1:50
3.	"Around the World Suite"	"In the Gloaming" by Annie Fortescue Harrison "April in Paris" by Vernon Duke & E.Y. Harburg "Estate" by Bruno Martino and Bruno Brighetti "Autumn in New York" by Vernon Duke	9:11
4.	"Bach to Brazil"	"Allemande" from French Suite No. 1 BWV 812 by Johann Sebastian Bach "Agua de Beber" by Antonio Carlos Jobim	5:55
5.	"Nature Boy/Fragile"	Eden Abbex/Sting	6:11
6.	"Boplicity"	Gil Evans/Cleo Henry	3:16
7.	"Fleurette Africaine"	Duke Ellington	6:31
8.	"Country"	Keith Jarrett	4:20
9.	"Without a Song"	Vincent Youmans	3:22
10.	"Spirituals"	Traditional: Deep River/Wade in the Water/Sometimes I Feel Like A Motherless Child/Swing Low Sweet Chariot	8:45

== Personnel ==
- Dmitri Matheny, flugelhorn
- Darrell Grant, piano
