= Starlight Cafe =

Third album by American flugelhornist Dmitri Matheny

Live album by Dmitri Matheny
- Released: September 29, 1998
- Genre: Jazz

Dmitri Matheny chronology
Penumbra: The Moon Sessions (1997)	Starlight Cafe (1998)	Santa's Got a Brand New Bag (2000)

Starlight Cafe is the third album by American flugelhornist Dmitri Matheny, was recorded live-in-concert at Note Café and Restaurant Provencal in Berkeley, California in 1998 and released the same year.

Starlight Cafe, produced by Dmitri Matheny and engineered by Brian Walker, was recorded live-in-concert and released in 1998 on Monarch Records (MR1018).

== Track listing ==
No.	Title	Writer(s)	Length
1.	"Stardust"	Mitchell Parish and Hoagy Carmichael	8:46
2.	"When Lights Are Low"	Benny Carter	7:18
3.	"Twilight World"	Marian McPartland	6:18
4.	"Spring Skylight"	Darrell Grant	6:09
5.	"Whisper, Muse"	Dmitri Matheny	5:00
6.	"Geneva"	Dmitri Matheny	6:38
7.	"Soca Nova"	Dmitri Matheny	4:12
8.	"Corcovado (Quiet Nights of Quiet Stars)"	Antonio Carlos Jobim	6:03
9.	"Saturn's Child"	Joe Locke	5:03
10.	"When You Wish Upon a Star"	Leigh Harline and Ned Washington	3:34

== Personnel ==
- Dmitri Matheny, flugelhorn
- Darrell Grant, piano
- Bill Douglass, bass
