= Pilot of the Airwaves =

1979 single by Charlie Dore

Single by Charlie Dore

from the album Where to Now
- B-side: "Falling"
- Released: November 1979 (UK); February 1980 (North America)
- Recorded: 1979
- Studio: Crazy Mama's
- Venue: Nashville, Tennessee, US
- Genre: Folk rock; pop rock
- Length: 3:19 (single version); 3:45 (album version)
- Label: Island
- Songwriters: Charlie Dore, Julian Littman
- Producers: Alan Tarney, Bruce Welch

Charlie Dore singles chronology
"Pilot of the Airwaves" (1979)	"Fear of Flying" (1979)

"Pilot of the Airwaves" is a song by the English singer-songwriter Charlie Dore. It was released as a single in 1979 from her album Where to Now.

The song reached number 13 on the Billboard Hot 100, and earned her the Record World New Female Artist of the Year, and an ASCAP award. The single also charted in Canada, Australia, and Europe.

== Content ==
The lyrics are from the point of view of a woman who frequently listens, late at night, to a radio disc jockey whom she calls a "pilot of the airwaves", keeping what has often been called the "dawn patrol". She admits that she has few real-life friends and that the DJ keeps her as much company as she believes she needs, describing her life and the feelings she has surrounding the fact that she considers the radio DJ her only true friend. The DJ does not need to play the selection she has requested; she does hope the DJ will do his best along those lines, adding:

I've been listening to your show on the radio,
And you seem like a friend to me.

== In history ==
On 5 November 1990, "Pilot of the Airwaves" was the final track played by Radio Caroline as an unlicensed offshore radio station.

== Charts ==
=== Weekly charts ===
Chart (1979–1980)	Peak position
Australia (KMR)	28
Canada RPM Top 100	3
New Zealand (RIANZ)	12
UK Singles (OCC)	66
US Billboard Hot 100	13
US Billboard Hot Adult Contemporary Tracks	4
US Cash Box Top 100	12

=== Year-end charts ===
Chart (1980)	Rank
Canada RPM Top 100	38
US Billboard Hot 100	77

== Cover versions ==
French singer Sheila recorded a version, entitled "Pilote sur les ondes", in 1980. Ingrid Peters recorded a German cover version, entitled "Weißt Du Wo Du Hingehst", in 1980.

== See also ==
- List of one-hit wonders in the United States
