= Freak 'n' Roll...Into the Fog: The Black Crowes All Join Hands, The Fillmore, San Francisco =

Freak 'n' Roll ...Into the Fog: The Black Crowes All Join Hands, The Fillmore, San Francisco

Live album & DVD by The Black Crowes
- Released: March 21, 2006
- Recorded: August 6, 2005
- Venue: The Fillmore (San Francisco)
- Genre: Blues rock, hard rock, southern rock, jam rock
- Length: 133:54
- Label: Eagle
- Producer: The Black Crowes

CD cover

Professional ratings
Review scores
| Source | Rating |
|---|---|
| AllMusic | 4/5 stars |

Freak 'n' Roll ...Into the Fog: The Black Crowes All Join Hands, The Fillmore, San Francisco is a live concert album released on DVD, CD and Blu-ray by American southern rock band The Black Crowes in 2006. Filmed at The Fillmore in August 2005, this performance was the second of a five-night stand at the theater. The set features guests Dave Ellis and the Left Coast Horns.

All three versions have the same track list, with the CD version being split over two discs between "Sunday Night Buttermilk Waltz" and "Cursed Diamond". They present the August 6, 2005 show in its entirety with one omission: the Rolling Stones cover "Loving Cup" was performed between "Welcome To The Goodtimes" and "Jealous Again", though the copies of the CD sold at Wal-Mart stores included access to a digital download of the omitted song.

== Track listing ==
All songs written by Chris Robinson and Rich Robinson, except where noted.

1. (Only) Halfway to Everywhere – 8:29
2. Sting Me – 4:41
3. No Speak No Slave – 5:31
4. Soul Singing – 9:46
5. Welcome to the Goodtimes – 4:02
6. Jealous Again – 5:04
7. Space Captain (Matthew Moore) – 4:43
8. My Morning Song – 13:49
9. Sunday Night Buttermilk Waltz – 5:06
10. Cursed Diamond – 7:24
11. She Talks to Angels – 6:10
12. Wiser Time – 7:14
13. Non Fiction – 10:18
14. Seeing Things – 7:16
15. Hard to Handle (Allen Jones, Alvertis Isbell, Otis Redding) – 8:27
16. Let Me Share the Ride – 9:24
17. Mellow Down Easy (Willie Dixon) – 4:35
18. Remedy – 5:39
19. The Night They Drove Old Dixie Down (Robbie Robertson) – 6:16

== Personnel ==
- Chris Robinson – vocals, harmonica, acoustic guitar
- Rich Robinson – guitar, vocals
- Marc Ford – guitar, vocals
- Steve Gorman – drums, percussion
- Sven Pipien – bass
- Ed Hawrysch – keyboards
- Mona Lisa Young – backing vocals
- Charity White – backing vocals

=== Left Coast Horns ===
- David Ellis – tenor sax
- Gavin Distasi – trumpet
- Josh Marshall – alto sax
- Marty Wehner – trombone
