= Jazz Noir =

11th album by American flugelhornist Dmitri Matheny

Studio album by Dmitri Matheny
- Released: 2016
- Genre: Jazz
- Producer: Dmitri Matheny

Dmitri Matheny chronology
Sagebrush Rebellion (2014)	Jazz Noir (2016)	Cascadia (2022)

Jazz Noir is the 11th album by American flugelhornist Dmitri Matheny, released in 2016.

== Description ==
The Papillon/BluePort Jazz release, Jazz Noir, Matheny's 11th album as leader, was produced by Dmitri Matheny and executive produced by Bill Matheny with recording engineers David Lange and Jeremy Goody. Jazz Noir includes movie themes from film noir classics, modern jazz standards, and two original pieces: Film Noir (with poem by Dana Gioia) and Crime Scenes.

== Track listing ==
No.	Title	Writer(s)	Length
1.	"Noir Medley"	Touch of Evil, Henry Mancini; Laura, David Raksin; Vertigo, Bernard Herrmann; Chinatown, Jerry Goldsmith; Taxi Driver, Bernard Herrmann; Blues in the Night, Harold Arlen	9:11
2.	"Stormy Weather"	Harold Arlen and Ted Koehler	4:13
3.	"Film Noir"	Dmitri Matheny and Dana Gioia	8:01
4.	"Audrey’s Dance"	Angelo Badalamenti and David Lynch	2:38
5.	"Crime Scenes"	Dmitri Matheny	12:11
6.	"Here’s Looking At You"	Charlie Haden	5:13
7.	"Caravan"	Duke Ellington, Irving Mills and Juan Tizol	5:07
8.	"Estate"	Bruno Martino and Bruno Brighetti	5:14
9.	"Golden Lady"	Stevie Wonder	5:30
10.	"High Wall"	Bronisław Kaper	4:08
11.	"The Long Goodbye"	John Williams and Johnny Mercer	4:54
12.	"What Now My Love?"	Gilbert Bécaud and Pierre Delanoë	5:14

== Personnel ==
- Dmitri Matheny, flugelhorn and spoken word
- Bill Anschell, piano (10, 11)
- Matt Clark piano, (2, 7, 8, 9)
- Nick Manson piano, (1, 5, 12)
- Charles McNeal, tenor saxophone (2, 7, 8, 9)
- Susan Pascal, vibraphone (3, 4, 6)
- Phil Sparks, bass (1, 3, 4, 5, 6, 12),
- Todd Strait, drums (1, 5, 12)
- Akira Tana, drums (2, 7, 8, 9)
- Jay Thomas, tenor and soprano saxophones (1, 5, 12)
- John Wiitala, bass (2, 7, 8, 9)
