= Dave Ellis (saxophonist) =

- Genres: Jazz
- Occupation: Musician
- Instrument: Saxophone
- Website: www.davellis.com

Dave Ellis is an American saxophonist. A native of the San Francisco Bay Area, Ellis came to prominence in the 1990s as a member of guitarist Charlie Hunter's band. Ellis has since been known for his work with Bob Weir after the breakup of the Grateful Dead and with flugelhornist Dmitri Matheny.

Ellis has recorded albums as a bandleader. His State of Mind album (2003), is his second recording produced by Orrin Keepnews and won a 2004 award for Outstanding Album from the California Music Awards.

Dave and his sister, Zoe Ellis, have collaborated as an act called ZADELL.

== Discography ==
As a solo artist

- Raven (Monarch, 1996)
- In the Long Run (Monarch, 1998)
- State of Mind (Milestone, 2001 [rel. 2003])

With Black Crowes

- Freak 'n' Roll...Into the Fog: The Black Crowes All Join Hands, The Fillmore, San Francisco (Eagle, 2006)

With Charlie Hunter

- Charlie Hunter Trio (Prawn Song, 1993)
- Bing, Bing, Bing! (Blue Note, 1995)
- Ready... Set... Shango! (Blue Note, 1996)

With Dmitri Matheny

- Red Reflections (Monarch, 1995)
- Penumbra: The Moon Sessions (Monarch, 1996)

With The Other Ones

- The Strange Remain (Arista, 1999)

With Bob Weir and RatDog

- Evening Moods (Arista, 2000)
