= Cascadia (album) =

Studio album by Dmitri Matheny
- Released: 2022
- Recorded: November 2–3, 2021
- Studios: David Lange Studios, Edgewood, Washington
- Genre: Jazz
- Length: 59:44

Dmitri Matheny chronology
Jazz Noir (2016)	Cascadia (2022)

Cascadia is the 12th album by American flugelhornist Dmitri Matheny, released in 2022 by Origin Records. The project was inspired by the Pacific Northwest.

== Track listing ==
Cascadia track listing
No.	Title	Writer(s)	Length
1.	"Cascadia"	Dmitri Matheny	4:26
2.	"On a Misty Night"	Tadd Dameron	6:23
3.	"Evergreen Girl"	Dmitri Matheny	6:33
4.	"Dark Eyes"	Dmitri Matheny	6:36
5.	"Perfect Peaches"	Dmitri Matheny	6:49
6.	"The Lonesome Road"	Dmitri Matheny	7:53
7.	"Bourdain"	Dmitri Matheny	4:07
8.	"Wichita Lineman"	Jimmy Webb	4:54
9.	"Humble Origins"	Bill Anschell	8:49
10.	"After the Rain"	John Coltrane	4:16

== Personnel ==
- Dmitri Matheny, flugelhorn
- Charles McNeal, saxophones
- Bill Anschell, piano
- Phil Sparks, bass
- Mark Ivester, drums
