= Martan Mann =

American jazz pianist and educator

Martan Mann is an American jazz pianist and educator living in Boulder Creek, California. He performs with the Martan Mann Trio, the Martan Mann & Mannkind (contemporary jazz band) and has performed with George Young and Dmitri Matheny. A graduate of San Jose State University, San Francisco State University, Hawaii Pacific College, and the University of Hawaii, he is a musical director at Capitola Theater in Capitola, California and is on the board of directors for the Jazz Society of Santa Cruz, California. Jazz educational books include Jazz Improvisation for the Classical Pianist (1989), New Age Improvisation for the Classical Pianist (1994), and Improvising blues piano (1997). He is also the author of a jazz educational DVD, Jazz Skills for Piano.
