= Big River (Jimmy Nail song) =

1995 single by Jimmy Nail

Single by Jimmy Nail

from the album Big River
- B-side: "Bitter and Twisted" (live); "What Kind of a Man Am I?"
- Released: 16 October 1995
- Length: 5:59
- Label: EastWest
- Songwriter: Jimmy Nail
- Producers: Danny Schogger; Jimmy Nail

Jimmy Nail singles chronology
"Only One Heart" (1995)	"Big River" (1995)	"Love" (1995)

"Big River" is a song written and performed by English singer and actor Jimmy Nail, included on his fourth studio album of the same name. The song was released as a single on 16 October 1995, reaching number 18 on the UK Singles Chart and number 10 in Hungary. In 2011, it was recorded by Joe McElderry for the DVD Big River Big Songs: The Tyne. McElderry also performed it for Sunday for Sammy in 2012.

== Background ==
The big river referred to in the title is the River Tyne that runs along the Southern edge of Nail's home town, Newcastle upon Tyne. The song is an elegy to the days when shipbuilding and industry in general were at their height in Newcastle and laments the later decline of the industry and therefore the decline of the importance and activity of the Tyne itself. However, in the last chorus, the song takes a more hopeful turn, declaring that, "the river will rise again".

The guitar work on the song was provided by Dire Straits frontman Mark Knopfler, who features in the music video. The song was adopted as an anthem by female workers in Liverpool during a lockout the following winter.

== Track listings ==
UK 7-inch single

A. "Big River" – 5:59
B. "Bitter and Twisted" (live version) – 4:08

UK and European CD single

1. "Big River" – 5:59
2. "Bitter and Twisted" (live version) – 4:08
3. "What Kind of a Man Am I?" (live version) – 5:32

European CD single 2

1. "Big River" – 5:59
2. "Bitter and Twisted" (live version) – 4:08
3. "What Kind of a Man Am I?" (live version) – 5:32
4. "Big River" (radio edit) – 4:17

== Charts ==
Chart (1995–1996)	Peak position
Hungary (Mahasz)	10
Scotland Singles (OCC)	10
UK Singles (OCC)	18
