= Crocodile Shoes (album) =

Studio album by Jimmy Nail
- Released: 1994
- Genre: Blues, rock
- Label: East West
- Producer: Tony McAnaney, Jimmy Nail, Jon Kelly

Jimmy Nail chronology
Growing Up in Public (1992)	Crocodile Shoes (1994)	Big River (1995)

Singles from Crocodile Shoes
- 1. "Crocodile Shoes" Released: 14 November 1994; 2. "Cowboy Dreams" Released: 30 January 1995; 3. "Calling Out Your Name" Released: 24 April 1995

Crocodile Shoes is an album by Jimmy Nail consisting of "original songs from the BBC Television serial" of the same name. It was released in 1994 by East West Records and peaked at number two on the UK Albums Chart. It was the Christmas number two album that year.

== Track listing ==
1. "Crocodile Shoes" – written by Tony McAnaney
2. "Calling Out Your Name" – written by Jimmy Nail
3. "Cowboy Dreams" – written by Paddy McAloon
4. "Once Upon a Time" – written by Jimmy Nail
5. "Only One Heart" – written by Croker and Nail
6. "Bitter and Twisted" – written by Jimmy Nail
7. "Love Will Find Someone for You" – written by Paddy McAloon
8. "Angel" – written by Nail
9. "Between a Woman and a Man" – written by Nail
10. "Don't Wanna Go Home" – written by Nail
11. "Dragons" – written by Paddy McAloon

== Chart performance ==
Chart (1994)	Peak position
Australian Albums (ARIA)	146
UK Albums Chart	2

== Personnel ==
- Jimmy Nail – vocals, harmonica, Hammond organ
- Tony McAnaney – guitar, bass guitar, harmonica, bouzouki
- Trevor Brewis – drums (tracks: 1,3,8)
- Paul Smith – drums, percussion
- Geoff Dugmore – drums
- Phil Palmer – guitar
- John Giblin – bass
- Paul Wickens – keyboards (tracks: 7, 10)
- B. J. Cole – pedal steel guitar
- Marcus Brown – keyboards, accordion, programming
- Steve Robson – fiddle, ocarina
- Danny Cummings – tambourine
- Dave Taggart, Margo Buchanan, Monica Reed-Price, Shirley Lewis – backing vocals
- Mixed by Jimmy Nail, Jon Kelly
