= Growing Up in Public (Jimmy Nail album) =

1992 pop album

Studio album by Jimmy Nail
- Released: 27 July 1992
- Recorded: Livingstone Studios, London; Metropolis Studios, London; Abbey Road Studios, London
- Genre: Pop
- Length: 44:43
- Label: Warner Music UK
- Producer: Guy Pratt; Danny Schogger; Jimmy Nail

Jimmy Nail chronology
Take It or Leave It (1986)	Growing Up in Public (1992)	Crocodile Shoes (1994)

Professional ratings
Review scores
Source	Rating
NME	6/10
The Vancouver Sun	2/5 stars
The Windsor Star	B+

Growing Up in Public is the second album by English actor and singer Jimmy Nail, released in 1992 on the Warner Music UK label. It was produced by Nail, Guy Pratt and Danny Schogger and includes the single "Ain't No Doubt", a UK chart topper for three weeks in July 1992. Three further singles were released, of which only "Laura" charted, at #58. Growing Up in Public reached #2 on the UK Albums Chart.

Contributors to the album include George Harrison (song "Real Love"), Gary Moore (song "Absent Friends"), David Gilmour (songs "Waiting for the Sunshine" and "Only Love (Can Bring Us Home)"), Sam Brown (singer).

== Track listing ==
Tracks 1–4 written by Guy Pratt, Danny Schogger, Jimmy Nail, Charlie Dore
Tracks 5–10 written by Pratt, Schogger, Nail

1. "Ain't No Doubt" – 4:09
2. "Reach Out" – 3:40
3. "Laura" – 4:25
4. "Waiting for the Sunshine" – 4:20
5. "Real Love" – 4:33
6. "Only Love (Can Bring Us Home)" – 5:46
7. "Wicked World" – 4:33
8. "Beautiful" – 4:40
9. "I Believed" – 4:26
10. "Absent Friends" – 4:11

== Singles ==
- "Ain't No Doubt" (UK #1)
- "Laura" (UK #58)
- "Beautiful"
- "Only Love (Can Bring Us Home)"

== Personnel ==
- Jimmy Nail – vocals
- Guy Pratt – bass guitar, backing vocals
- Danny Schogger – keyboards
- Elliott Randall, David Gilmour, George Harrison, Gary Moore – guitar
- Sylvia Mason-James, Katie Kissoon, Sam Brown, Linda Taylor, Andy Caine – backing vocals
- Steve Sidwell, Ned Sidwell, Steve Gregory, Stuart Brook, Nigel Hitchcock, Martin Dobson – brass
- Kate St John – oboe
- Kevin Healy – Spanish guitar
- Gary Wallis, Marc Fox, Graham Ward, Neil Conti – percussion

== Charts ==
Chart performance for Growing Up in Public
Chart (1992)	Peak position
Australian Albums (ARIA)	64
New Zealand Albums (RMNZ)	36
Swedish Albums (Sverigetopplistan)	49
UK Albums (OCC)	2
