= Ain't No Doubt =

1992 single by Jimmy Nail

Single by Jimmy Nail

from the album Growing Up in Public
- B-side: "What Can I Say"
- Released: 29 June 1992
- Studio: Livingston (London, England)
- Genre: Pop; R&B; swingbeat
- Length: 3:57
- Label: EastWest
- Songwriters: Guy Pratt; Danny Schogger; Jimmy Nail; Charlie Dore
- Producers: Guy Pratt; Danny Schogger; Jimmy Nail

Jimmy Nail singles chronology
"Love Don't Live Here Anymore" (1985)	"Ain't No Doubt" (1992)	"Laura" (1992)

"Ain't No Doubt" is a song by the English actor and singer-songwriter Jimmy Nail, released on 29 June 1992 by EastWest Records as the first single from his second album, Growing Up in Public (1992). Composed by Nail with Guy Pratt, Danny Schogger, and Charlie Dore, the song features additional vocals from Sylvia Mason-James. Six years after his debut album, Nail revived his singing career during the success of his television drama series Spender, where he played the titular character. "Ain't No Doubt" reached number one in both Ireland and the United Kingdom, and was a top-10 hit in Australia, Belgium, Denmark, the Netherlands, New Zealand and Sweden.

== Composition ==
Bassist and co-writer Guy Pratt stated that the song was conceived during a writing session between him, Jimmy Nail and Danny Schogger. He said that the song was based around the bassline, which he wrote to copy the military cadences he had recently seen in the film Full Metal Jacket (1987).

== Critical reception ==
Larry Flick from Billboard magazine named the song a "slick, R&B/pop shuffler", noting that here, "storytelling verses are offset by hummable chorus that sticks in your brain after the first listen. Overall relaxed vibe of track will easily open AC doors." Randy Clark from Cash Box found that it "has its roots in seventies soul and disco, which is enjoying a club popularity in the UK right now." He added, "Jimmy talks a little on the verses, borrows a girl voice for the bridge then sings the almost military-march sounding chorus." A reviewer from Daily Mirror complimented Mason-James, stating that "it's her lung-busting voice that has made the song such a delight". Tom Ewing of Freaky Trigger felt it's a "one-of-a-kind meeting of pub rock and swingbeat: ruminative, finger-pointing spoken passages broken up by a two-fisted funk chorus that lunges at you like a closing time drunk." He remarked that "it's also an unintentionally funny record."

Dave Sholin from the Gavin Report commented, "A full-blown pop production with a rhythmic groove provides this artist, voted England's "sexiest man", with dynamic material. He complimented its "bright instrumentation" and "a superb vocal arrangement" that gives the song a "fresh appeal". Paul Mathur from Melody Maker wrote, "Nail is about an inch away from brilliance and is therefore a failure. Life's tough. It starts with spoken bit that echoes Kevin Rowland of all people and there's a bit where the girl says she loves him and he mumbles, "she's lying" with a throwaway magnificence. Then it all goes horribly wrong and the bargain bins rumble menacingly. The video stars the most beautiful girl in Britain though so set your timers." Pan-European magazine Music & Media noted that from BBC detective series Spender actor Nail "has now started spending time on the top slot in the UK singles chart. The spoken verses and sung chorus together make a nice pop/dance tune in the no man's land between Jason Donovan and Simply Red." Newcastle Journal described it as a "mournful song [where] he sings and talks".

== Chart performance ==
"Ain't No Doubt" is Nail's most successful hit worldwide, peaking at number one in Ireland and the United Kingdom, as well as reaching the top 10 in Australia, Belgium, Denmark, the Netherlands, New Zealand, and Sweden. In the UK, the song topped the UK Airplay Chart for six consecutive weeks. On the Eurochart Hot 100, it peaked at number eight in August 1992, as well as topping the European Adult Contemporary Radio Chart. The song became Nail's only hit in North America, reaching number 58 on the RPM 100 Hit Tracks chart in Canada.

== Track listings ==
- 7-inch single

A. "Ain't No Doubt" – 3:57
B. "What Can I Say" – 4:29

- UK and European CD single
1. "Ain't No Doubt" (7-inch version) – 3:57
2. "Ain't No Doubt" (Lies remix) – 6:11
3. "Ain't No Doubt" (Damned Lies remix) – 4:45
4. "What Can I Say" – 4:29

== Charts ==
=== Weekly charts ===
Chart (1992)	Peak position
Australia (ARIA)	5
Austria (Ö3 Austria Top 40)	14
Belgium (Ultratop 50 Flanders)	5
Canada Top Singles (RPM)	58
Denmark (IFPI)	10
Europe (Eurochart Hot 100)	8
Europe (European AC Radio)	1
Europe (European Hit Radio)	2
Germany (GfK)	18
Ireland (IRMA)	1
Italy (Musica e dischi)	24
Netherlands (Dutch Top 40)	9
Netherlands (Single Top 100)	16
New Zealand (Recorded Music NZ)	4
Sweden (Sverigetopplistan)	3
Switzerland (Schweizer Hitparade)	21
UK Singles (Official Charts)	1
UK Airplay (Music Week)	1

=== Year-end charts ===
Chart (1992)	Position
Australia (ARIA)	33
Belgium (Ultratop)	61
Europe (Eurochart Hot 100)	35
Europe (European Hit Radio)	5
Germany (Media Control)	87
Sweden (Topplistan)	22
UK Singles (OCC)	8
UK Airplay (Music Week)	9

== Certifications ==
Region	Certification	Certified units/sales
Australia (ARIA)	Gold	35,000^{^}
United Kingdom (BPI)	Gold	400,000^{^}
^{^} Shipments figures based on certification alone.

== Release history ==
Region	Date	Format(s)	Label(s)	Ref.
United Kingdom	29 June 1992	7-inch vinyl; 12-inch vinyl; CD; cassette	EastWest	
Australia	10 August 1992	CD; cassette	EastWest	
Japan	25 October 1992	Mini-CD	EastWest	
