= Charlie Dore =

English singer-songwriter, actress (b. 1956)

- Born: 1956 (age 68–69); Pinner, Middlesex, England
- Genres: Folk, pop
- Occupations: Singer-songwriter; composer; multi-instrumentalist; record producer; actress
- Instruments: Vocals; guitar; pump organ; autoharp
- Labels: Island; Chrysalis
- Website: charliedore.com

Charlie Dore (born 1956) is an English singer-songwriter, composer, multi-instrumentalist, and actress.

Although best known as a singer-songwriter, Dore has a multi-faceted career that includes acting in film, TV and radio, comedy-improvisation, and composition for film and TV. She studied drama at the Arts Educational School, Tring and London.

== Career ==
=== Early years ===
Dore worked for two years in repertory in Newcastle at the Tyneside Theatre Company, starting in the touring company, Stagecoach, where she performed in theatres, schools, streets, a psychiatric hospital, Oxford University, and the Swan Hunter shipyard canteen. She later appeared in several shows directed by Michael Bogdanov, including a rock musical version of Euripides' The Bacchae; Orgy by Cecil Taylor; Oh, What a Lovely War!; and Joe Orton's What the Butler Saw.

Moving back to London, Dore worked in fringe theatre, then joined Thames TV's long-running series Rainbow for 18 months, writing and performing songs with Julian Littman, whom she had met at drama school, and Karl Johnson, an actor-musician from the Tyneside Theatre Company before being replaced by the more familiar ensemble of Rod Burton, Matthew Corbett and Jane Tucker which evolved into Rod, Jane and Freddy. After this, Dore, Littman and Johnson composed and recorded the original theme from the BBC pre-school series You and Me.

A friend, blues guitarist Sam Mitchell, asked Dore to deputise for him at Obelisk, a Westbourne Grove pancake house where he played on Monday nights. Dore co-opted Julian Littman and Karl Johnson to help pad out the long sets required and the band grew, eventually including Karl's brother Stuart Johnson on banjo and dobro, and various guests on fiddle, mandolin, and guitar. It was the basis of her first band, Hula Valley. The band played a selection of bluegrass, western swing, and hillbilly music, as Dore was yet to start her own songwriting.

As the band grew and changed shape and name, from Prairie Oyster to Fresh Oyster to Charlie Dore's Back Pocket, original material started to flow and the band played the London pub and club circuit, regularly appearing at The Hope & Anchor, The Half Moon, Dingwalls, and the Rock Garden. During this period the band personnel was still changing and included, among others, Charlie Gaisford, Ian McCann, Keith Nelson, Gus York, Garrick Dewar, Paul Atkinson and Pick Withers on drums, who was also playing with the early Dire Straits.

=== First album ===
She was spotted by Island Records and signed to a solo recording and publishing deal by Chris Blackwell in 1978, later that year being flown to Nashville, Tennessee, to work with producer Audie Ashworth at his Crazy Mama's studio. Dore continued to work with Littman, her guitarist and co-writer, and the first album, Where to Now, featured many favoured session musicians, including Charlie McCoy, Reggie Young, Sonny Curtis, and David Briggs.

Island employed Joe Boyd to re-mix the album, but thought the album 'too country' and drafted in the British record producers Alan Tarney and Bruce Welch to re-record several tracks, including "Fear of Flying" and "Pilot of the Airwaves". The latter went on to become an enduring radio favourite, reaching No. 13 on the U.S. Billboard Hot 100, earning Dore the Record World New Female Artist of the Year, an ASCAP award and charting in Canada, Australia, and Europe. The single reached number 66 on the UK Singles Chart, and Dore left Island for a deal with Chrysalis Records. Chrysalis teamed Dore with the record producer, Glyn Johns, but the company were not happy with the result, and Dore was flown to Los Angeles to re-record the entire album with producer Stewart Levine.

On 5 November 1990, "Pilot of the Airwaves" was the final track played by Radio Caroline as an unlicensed offshore radio station.

=== Second album ===
The second album, Listen!, featured most of Toto as the studio band. She toured with her UK band throughout 1981 and 1982, representing the UK in Tokyo at the Yamaha Song Festival and won the Silver prize at the Seoul Song Festival with her song "Sister Revenge".

=== As an actress ===
In 1983, she starred opposite Jonathan Pryce and Tim Curry In Richard Eyre's film, The Ploughman's Lunch, and during the 1980s more acting work followed, including leading roles in A Killing on the Exchange (1987) and Hard Cases (1989) for ITV, South of the Border (1988) for BBC, and two productions, Whistle Stop and The Big Sweep with People Show, the UK's longest running fringe theatre group.

Dore also appeared in Eric Idle's comedy for BBC radio, Behind the Crease, directed by Harry Thompson. It was a second collaboration, the first being a duet with Idle, "Harry," which Idle had written, composed, and performed with Dore as a jokey birthday present for his friend Harry Nilsson. However, Nilsson surprised Idle by including the original recording on his 1980 Flash Harry album.

=== As a songwriter ===
During this time she started to have success as a writer for other artists, initially scoring a U.S. number 7 hit with "Strut", co-written and co-composed with Littman for Sheena Easton, and going on to have her songs recorded by artists including Tina Turner, George Harrison, Celine Dion, Paul Carrack, Ricky Ross, Worlds Apart, and Jimmy Nail; for whom she co-wrote "Ain't No Doubt", a UK number 1.

=== In comedy ===
In 1990, she co-founded comedy-improvisation troupe, Dogs on Holiday, which hosted and performed at its own Soho venue, The Hurricane Club. The club, which ran for six years on Saturday nights with a mixture of improvisation and stand-up, played regular host to the emerging careers of comedians such as Mark Lamarr, Harry Hill, and Jo Brand, and also enjoyed a guest visit from Robin Williams, who joined the team onstage for an evening of improvisation.

=== Things Change ===
In 1995, Dore ventured back into the recording studio to record her own album, Things Change (Black Ink/Grapevine), which included the original version of "Refuse to Dance", featuring actor Alan Rickman (this song was later covered by Celine Dion on her multi-platinum album The Colour of My Love). The album also included "Time Goes By", which was remixed by Italian team Souled Out (who later became known as Planet Funk) and produced a European dance hit, reaching number 6 in Italy and number 1 in Israel.

== Later career ==
Over the next decade she continued to produce hits for artists including the German pop idols No Angels, Lisa Stansfield, Hayley Westenra, Status Quo, and a second track for Celine Dion, "Rain, Tax (It's Inevitable)", co-written with another long-standing collaborator, Terry Britten, which appeared on Dion's A New Day Has Come.

Between 2001 and 2003, Dore and Littman provided the score for two series of BBC drama, Two Thousand Acres of Sky, and also a film, Roman Road (Zenith 2004). During this time she also collaborated with Simon Rogers, one half of underground dance group Slacker, to produce Space Country, a collection of ambient country music.

In 2005, Dore released Sleep All Day and Other Stories, a return to her acoustic country-folk roots, followed by Cuckoo Hill in 2006. Both albums won her excellent reviews, as well as the International Acoustic Music Awards Grand Prize for the song, "Looking for My Own Lone Ranger". "File under treasure," wrote Charlie Gillett in The Observer's Music Magazine.

In 2008, Dore won Overall Grand Prize as well as Best Folk Award at the 4th Annual International Acoustic Music Awards. The following year saw the release of The Hula Valley Songbook, a collection of American hillbilly, western swing, and popular favourites of the 1930s, based around the set list performed by her first band and originally recorded by artists such as Jimmie Rodgers, Al Bowlly, and Milton Brown. Dore toured the UK with her band, Littman, Dudley Phillips, Steve Simpson, and Jake Walker, collectively known as the Hula Valley Orchestra, also opening for Jools Holland and his Rhythm & Blues Orchestra for several of his summer concerts.

In October 2009, Dore's cover of "Here Comes the Sun", a Hawaiian reggae version produced with Littman, was included in Mojo magazine's tribute album, Abbey Road Revisited. It was the biggest selling edition of the magazine to date.

In April 2011, Dore released Cheapskate Lullabyes, which included an unplugged rendition of "I'm Cleaning Out My House" from her previous album, The Hula Valley Songbook. It was released on CD and digitally through iTunes.

== Discography ==
=== Albums ===
- 1979 Where to Now on LP/TC (Island) and reissue CD on CherryRed/Lemon Records (US number 145)
- 1981 Listen! on LP/TC (Chrysalis) and reissue CD on CherryRed/Lemon Records
- 1981 Listen! on LP (Chrysalis) Japanese pressing WWS-81446/VIP-4113
- 1995 Things Change on CD
- 2005 Sleep All Day and Other Stories on CD
- 2006 Cuckoo Hill on CD
- 2009 The Hula Valley Songbook on CD/mp3
- 2011 Cheapskate Lullabyes on CD/mp3
- 2014 Milk Roulette on CD/mp3
- 2017 Dark Matter on CD/mp3
- 2020 Like Animals on CD/mp3

=== Singles ===
- 1979 "Pilot of the Airwaves" (US number 13 Pop (Billboard) number 12 (Cashbox) / number 4 Adult Contemporary, 1980) UK number 66; CAN number 3, AUS number 28, NZ number 2, GER number 37
- 1979 "Fear of Flying"
- 1981 "Listen", AUS number 85
- 1997 "Time Goes By" UK number 79, IT number 6, ISR number 1
- 2005 "Sleep All Day"
- 2005 "Cartoon"
- 2007 "Some Kind of Love"
- 2024. “Blowing Leaves”
