= Big River (Jimmy Nail album) =

Studio album by Jimmy Nail
- Released: 1995
- Studio: RAK Studios; Abbey Road Studios
- Label: East West
- Producer: Jimmy Nail; Danny Schogger

Jimmy Nail chronology
Crocodile Shoes (1994)	Big River (1995)	Crocodile Shoes II (1996)

Professional ratings
Review scores
Source	Rating
AllMusic	2/5 stars

Big River is the fourth album by English singer and actor Jimmy Nail, released in 1995. It contains the singles "Big River", which reached number 18 in the UK Singles Chart, and a cover of John Lennon's "Love", which reached number 33.

== Track listing ==
All tracks written by Jimmy Nail, except where noted.

No.	Title	Writer(s)	Length
1.	"Big River"		6:00
2.	"I Think of You"	Peter Lee Stirling	3:50
3.	"Can't Hold On"	Nail; Andy Caine; Danny Schogger	4:52
4.	"Right to Know"		3:49
5.	"Love"	John Lennon	4:03
6.	"What Kind of Man Am I?"		4:33
7.	"Something That We Had"	Nail; Caine; Schogger	4:21
8.	"What's the Use?"		3:33
9.	"Hands of Time"		4:28
10.	"I Wonder (Will I Ever Love Again?)"		4:34

== Personnel ==
Adapted from the album's liner notes.

Musicians

- Jimmy Nail – lead vocals (all tracks), harmonica (track 4), foot stomp (track 6), cow bell (track 7)
- Hugh Burns – acoustic guitar (tracks 1, 2, 4)
- Andy Caine – backing vocals (tracks 1, 7–9), acoustic guitar (tracks 2–5, 7–10)
- Guy Chambers – piano (tracks 1, 2, 4–10)
- Alan Clark – organ (tracks 1, 4, 6)
- Caroline Dale – cello (track 10)
- Melvin Duffy – pedal steel guitar (tracks 1, 2, 4–10)
- Geoff Dugmore – drums (all tracks), percussion (all tracks)
- Chester Kamen – electric guitar (tracks 2, 4–7, 9, 10)
- Mark Knopfler – lead guitar (track 1)
- Tony McAnaney – additional electric guitar (track 6)
- Tessa Niles – backing vocals (tracks 1, 6)
- Fionn O'Lochlainn – bass guitar (all tracks)
- Steve Robson – violin (track 9)
- Danny Schogger – synthesiser (tracks 1, 2, 4–7, 10), piano (track 3)
- Geoff Whitehorn – electric guitar (track 3)

Technical

- All tracks produced by Jimmy Nail and Danny Schogger
- Mixed by Jon Kelly
- Engineered by Cameron Jenkins
- Assistant engineers: Graeme Stewart, Guy Massey, Will O'Donovan and Sam Gibson
- Recorded at RAK Studios and Abbey Road Studios, London
- Mixed at Whitfield Street Studios and Westside Studios, London
- Front cover photography by David Bailey
- Artist management by Tarquin Gotch and Emma Kamen

== Charts ==
Chart performance for Big River
Chart (1995)	Peak position
Australian Albums (ARIA)	176
Scottish Albums (OCC)	11
UK Albums (OCC)	8

== Certifications ==
Region	Certification	Certified units/sales
United Kingdom (BPI)	Platinum	300,000^{^}
^{^} Shipments figures based on certification alone.
