= Jimmy Nail =

English actor & vocalist (born 1954)

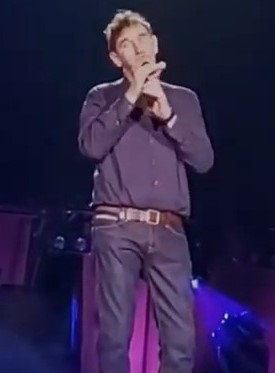
- Nail at the Sunday for Sammy concert in Newcastle, February 2020
- Born: James Michael Patrick Aloysius Bradford; 16 March 1954 (age 72); Newcastle upon Tyne, England
- Occupations: Actor; author; vocalist; songwriter; screenwriter; producer
- Years active: 1982–2005; 2008–2009; 2012; 2013–2016; 2018; 2020; 2024–present
- Children: 2
- Relatives: Val McLane (sister)
- Musical career
- Genres: Pop; rock; soul; country
- Instruments: Vocals; guitar
- Labels: Virgin; East West; Papillon

James Michael Aloysius Bradford (born 16 March 1954), known professionally as Jimmy Nail, is an English singer-songwriter, actor, film producer and television writer. He played the role of Leonard "Oz" Osborne in the television series Auf Wiedersehen, Pet (1983–1986), the title role in Spender (1991–1993) and Jed Shepperd in Crocodile Shoes (1994–1996). His performance as Agustín Magaldi in the 1996 film Evita gave him international recognition.

In addition to his acting career, he has maintained a solo music career. He has released eight albums and has three top-ten singles, including "Ain't No Doubt", which topped the UK singles chart in 1992.

== Early life ==
James Michael Aloysius Bradford was born in Newcastle upon Tyne to father Jimmy and mother Laura. His father was an Irish Catholic shipyard worker, amateur boxer, and professional footballer for Huddersfield Town and Hartlepools United. Nail describes himself as an angry child who was expelled from secondary school for setting fire to curtains. When he was 13, his sister, Shelagh, died at a party from an overdose of alcohol and antidepressant drugs aged 20. He later spent time drinking, fighting, and generally rebelling against authority. He was involved in a fight after a Newcastle United match during the 1970s and served a prison sentence for grievous bodily harm.

After being released, he worked in a glass factory. While opening a crate of glass, he stood on a six-inch spike that went through his foot and thereafter was called "Nail", a name he later adopted professionally. Also at that time, he sang in a rock band called the King Crabs. His sister Val McLane is an actress who co-founded the Live Theatre Company in Newcastle in 1973 and later became Head of Drama at University of Sunderland.

== Career ==
Nail has enjoyed a wide and varied career since his big break in 1983, not only has he appeared in television shows, he has appeared in several films, released a number of albums and also acted on stage.

=== Television ===
In 1982, Nail's partner, Miriam, encouraged him to audition for a television show, and although he had no experience as an actor, he won the role of Leonard "Oz" Osborne in the BAFTA-nominated Auf Wiedersehen, Pet, an ITV comedy drama about UK construction workers working abroad. After a slow beginning in 1983, ratings reached 17 million. He also appeared in the second series, which aired for 13 weeks in 1986.

In 1989, Nail and Ian La Frenais began work on an idea which became the BBC television drama series Spender. Spender ran for three series, totalling 22 hours, airing from 1990 to 1992, and included a 2-hour Christmas special in 1993. Ratings stayed around 14 million throughout the series' run.

In 1994, Nail created, executive produced, wrote and starred in the BBC television drama series Crocodile Shoes. Originally conceived as a single film for BBC2, the series ran on BBC1 for two series over 13 hours. The series averaged around 9 million viewers per episode. The show's eponymous album went on to sell over one million copies.

In 2000, he began work on reviving the Auf Wiedersehen, Pet series, this time for the BBC. It was filmed in Middlesbrough and Arizona in 2001 and aired in 2002, with audience figures of 12.9 million. The series was BAFTA-nominated. Another series saw the team travel to Havana, and the final two-hour instalment, set in Laos, broadcast over Christmas 2004 attracting over seven million viewers.

In 2008, Nail created and starred as Phil Parker in Parents of the Band, a six-episode series on BBC One, broadcast between November 2008 and January 2009. The series revolved around a group of teenagers who formed a band just for their own enjoyment, and their parents, who expected them to be the next Led Zeppelin. Ratings were disappointing, around three million viewers.

=== Music ===
Prior to becoming an actor, Nail had been a musician for several years on the local scene in Newcastle and was most notably the lead singer in the King Crabs, known locally as The Crabs. He was renowned for performing in his girlfriend's dress and a pair of Doc Marten boots. Following his success in Auf Wiedersehen, Pet, record companies became interested in Nail releasing a record. In 1985, he recorded the album, Take It Or Leave It, which included the single, "Love Don't Live Here Anymore", a cover of the Rose Royce hit. It was a hit for Nail, peaking at No. 3 in the charts and leading to his first appearance on Top of the Pops. After that success, his music career took a back seat. After seven years away, Nail re-emerged in 1992 with the pop single "Ain't No Doubt", co-written by Nail, Danny Schogger, Guy Pratt and Charlie Dore. It peaked at No. 1 and spent three weeks at the top of the charts, leading to appearances on Top of the Pops. The album, Growing Up in Public, was also a success and peaked at No. 2 in the UK Album Charts. The album featured guests such as Gary Moore, David Gilmour, Elliot Randall and George Harrison.

Nail's music career took off, and his third album, Crocodile Shoes, was released in conjunction with the television series of the same name, which began airing on BBC1 in November 1994. Not only was the title track a hit, peaking at No. 4, further singles, "Cowboy Dreams" and "Calling Out Your Name", the album itself peaking at No. 2, selling over a million copies. In 1995, his fourth release, Big River, which reached No. 8, scoring a further Top 10 album. The title track, which was a tribute to his hometown of Newcastle, was also a success, peaking at No. 18 and saw Nail perform it on Top of the Pops. Mark Knopfler also featured on the track as guest guitarist. "Big River" is often played prior to kick-off at Newcastle United's stadium, St James' Park. A version of John Lennon's "Love" was also released as a single and reached No. 33 in the charts towards the end of 1995.

In 1996, Crocodile Shoes II was released, once again in conjunction with the television series. While it did not reach the heights of the first release, the album still performed well, peaking at No. 10. The lead single, "Country Boy", peaked at No. 25. In 1997, Nail's back catalogue was deemed good enough to release a compilation, The Nail File: The Best of Jimmy Nail, which also had an accompanying VHS which included all the music videos for the tracks. The album included all the hits from his career plus one new track, a cover of "Black and White", where he duetted with Ranking Roger. It was released as a single and peaked at No. 76.

In 1999, Tadpoles In A Jar was released and reached No. 79 in the charts. Ten Great Songs and an OK Voice (Papillon, 2001) was an album comprising many of his favourite songs by other writers. Nail sang on the film soundtrack for Evita and received a double-platinum disk in recognition of 600,000-plus sales of the eponymous album.

With Tim Healy, Nail co-founded the Sammy Johnson Memorial Fund, established in 1999 in memory of their friend and colleague Sammy Johnson, to help young talent in North East England. He has participated in the Sunday for Sammy benefit concerts. By 2021, the fund has given out over £600,000 in bursaries and support. Nail performed at the 2000, 2002, 2004 and 2006 shows, before he resigned from the board due to work commitments.

After some time away from the limelight, Nail joined Sting on stage during a show at Sage, Gateshead on 5 February 2012 to sing on "Every Breath You Take".

In 2026, Nail toured the UK, playing over 50 dates around the country, accompanied by pianist Tony Davis. He also released the CD Home, which was available to purchase at the shows. It's his first release in 25 years.

=== Theatre and film ===
Nail worked as an extra on the British gangster film Get Carter (1971). Although this has been disputed in some quarters, in his 2004 autobiography A Northern Soul (paperback edition pp. 69–70, 133, 175–176) he confirms his involvement in the movie, albeit momentarily, and how he got to joke about that "moment" some years later with Get Carter director Mike Hodges when the two worked together on Morons From Outer Space (1985). Nail played gamekeeper Rabbetts in Danny, the Champion of the World, a 1989 television film based on the novel of the same name by Roald Dahl, and had a lead singing role in the 1996 film adaptation of Evita. In 1998 Nail played Les Wickes in the Columbia Pictures film Still Crazy. The film's main theme, "The Flame Still Burns", performed by Nail, was nominated for a Golden Globe award.

In 2014, Nail came out of retirement to act and sing in The Last Ship, a musical by Sting about the shipbuilders of Newcastle upon Tyne, the hometown of both Nail and Sting. Sting grew up in Wallsend, close to the shipyards. Nail worked in the shipyards and is the son of a shipyard foreman. The show opened in Chicago. On Broadway, when ticket sales began to drop, Sting replaced Nail to try to save the musical, but it ended after a short run. Nail sang on the Original Broadway Cast Recording and on Sting's album, The Last Ship.

Nail played Parson Nathaniel in a twelve-week run of the Bill Kenwright production of War of the Worlds alongside David Essex and Michael Praed at the Dominion Theatre, London in 2016. Nail had been due to reprise his role in the UK production of The Last Ship at Northern Stage on 12 March 2018. The show's producer Karl Sydow stated: "After protracted negotiations carried out in good faith, we regret to announce the production's offer of employment to Jimmy Nail has been withdrawn. Joe McGann will replace him when the show opens in Newcastle in March." Nail said "I was very much looking forward to appearing in Sting's The Last Ship, particularly here in my home city, sadly that's not to be."

In 2019, Nail began working on Seconds Away!, a play with music, for the Newcastle-based Live Theatre Company. This culminated in a two-week run of a staged reading of the play, which commenced on 6 February 2024. Nail has written the songs in the show and also plays the main character, Frankie Tanner.

After 14 years away, Nail appeared at the Sunday for Sammy show in February 2020. He featured in an Auf Wiedersehen, Pet sketch with Tim Healy, Kevin Whately and Christopher Fairbank and also sang "Ain't No Doubt" and "Big River", joined by Healy, Whately and Joe McElderry for the latter.

In May 2024, Nail was at the forefront of the 40th anniversary of Auf Wiedersehen, Pet celebrations at City Hall, Newcastle. Not only was he part of a special reunion of fellow cast members, he performed live and played several songs related to the show and some of his own songs.

In December 2025 and January 2026, Nail played a number of shows at Newcastle's Live Theatre, where he sang songs from Crocodile Shoes.

== Defamation lawsuit ==
In 2004, Nail sued News Group Newspapers and Harper Collins Publishers. The lawsuit concerned false and defamatory allegations made two years before in an article in News of the World and Nailed, a biography which was the newspaper's source for the claims. He described reading the article as one of the worst experiences of his life. He reportedly received damages of £30,000.

== Personal life ==
Nail has two children and lives in Newcastle with his partner Janet Cabourn. He is a supporter of Newcastle United. He has been a patron of FACT, a North-East based cancer charity, since 2017.

== Filmography ==
=== Film ===
Year	Title	Role	Notes
1985	Morons from Outer Space	Desmond Brock	
1985	Howling II: Your Sister Is a Werewolf	Dom	
1988	Crusoe	Tarik	
1988	Dream Demon	Paul	
1988	Just Ask for Diamond	Boyle	
1989	Danny, the Champion of the World	Rabbetts	
1996	Evita	Agustín Magaldi	
1998	Still Crazy	Les Wickes	

=== Television ===
Year	Title	Role	Notes
1983–1984, 1986, 2002, 2004	Auf Wiedersehen, Pet	Leonard "Oz" Osborne	40 episodes
1983	Spyship	Metcalfe	2 episodes
1984	Minder	Nathan Loveridge	Episode: "The Car Lot Baggers"
1984	Master of the Game	Schmidt	Episode 1 Miniseries
1985	Blott on the Landscape	Edwards	Episode: "Cards on the Table"
1985	Wallenberg: A Hero's Story	Vilmos Langfelder	Television film
1986	Nicking Kids	Criminal 1	
1986	Lenny Henry Tonite	Guest Star	Episode: "Neighbourhood Watch"
1986	Educating Oz	Oz Osborne	Television film
1986	Shoot for the Sun	Geordie	Television film
1991–1993	Spender	Freddie Spender	21 episodes Also writer, producer and creator
1994	Crocodile Shoes	Jed Shepperd	7 episodes Also writer, executive producer, creator and director/co-director
1996	Crocodile Shoes II	Jed Shepperd	6 episodes Also writer, executive producer and creator
2000	The 10th Kingdom	Clayface The Goblin	Miniseries
2008–2009	Parents of the Band	Phil Parker	6 episodes Also creator, executive producer and title music composer

== Discography ==
- Take It or Leave It (1986)
- Growing Up in Public (1992)
- Crocodile Shoes (1994)
- Big River (1995)
- Crocodile Shoes II (1996)
- Tadpoles in a Jar (1999)
- 10 Great Songs and an OK Voice (2001)
- Home (2026)

== Sources ==
- Larkin, Colin. The Encyclopedia of Popular Music, 3rd edition, Macmillan, 1998.
