= Paula West =

American jazz and cabaret singer (born 1959)

- Born: April 5, 1959 (age 67); Camp Pendleton, California, U.S.
- Genres: Vocal jazz, cabaret
- Occupation: Singer
- Years active: 1989–present

Paula West (born April 5, 1959) is an American jazz and cabaret singer.

== Early career ==
West was born on April 5, 1959, and raised in the San Diego, California area, the daughter of a Marine Corps family. As a child she was not much exposed to jazz, as her father preferred classical music. She only started to explore jazz and jazz vocal music during college; these explorations became more serious and focussed when she moved to San Francisco after graduating from college. She has also been at some pains in the past to note that "I never sang in church."

She arrived in San Francisco around 1988–89 and worked as a waitress (indeed, she held one job or another waiting tables for many years until her singing career was well established). During this time, she gradually started to appear at open-mic jam sessions, during the course of which she met pianist Ken Muir, who would eventually become her long-time accompanist. She also undertook a program of serious vocal study while continuing to appear at local lounges.

== 1990s ==
As word spread through the Bay Area, West started to get one- and two-week residencies at San Francisco hotel lounges, most notably the Ritz-Carlton. During this period she started to refine the distinctive elements of her approach to the expectations placed upon jazz singer/cabaret performers: a careful attention to the lyrics of the songs ("I sing the verses," she was once quoted, "not just the chorus." ), an ability to sustain notes without use of vibrato, a sparing reliance on the hoary chestnuts of the genre, a willingness to re-imagine the standards that she does perform, and an eagerness to identify worthy songs not usually found within the jazz/cabaret repertoire.

As an illustration of the last point, she has performed or recorded such non-standard songs as Bob Dylan's "Subterranean Homesick Blues" and "Mr. Tambourine Man", "If I Only Had A Brain" from The Wizard of Oz, The Beatles' "Fixin' A Hole", Ella Mae Morse's "Cow Cow Boogie", "Who Will Buy" from Oliver!, Bert Williams' turn of the (20th) century classic "Nobody", and Johnny Cash's "Folsom Prison Blues", as well as "Danny Boy".

West performed predominately in clubs in San Francisco and New York City, with occasional performances in Europe. For ten years she held a one-month residency at the Empire Plush Room at the York Hotel in San Francisco (since closed). She also had recurring engagements at the Oak Room of the Algonquin Hotel in New York (also since closed). West is one of the contributors on BBC World News' The Real... talking about her favorite places in San Francisco.

== 2000 to present ==
West performed with Eric Reed and reviewers began to take note that her career was "spiraling in the right direction."

In 2007, West began performing with noted pianist/arranger George Mesterhazy (who accompanied the late Jazz great Shirley Horn), and their work together has been lauded in The New York Times, "Ms. West is accompanied by the George Mesterhazy Quartet, a limber ensemble whose leader, pianist and arranger shares her passion for taking songs in unexpected directions and deepening their meanings without wrenching them out of shape. With each engagement Ms. West, who made her Oak Room debut in 1996, displays more courage, maturity, interpretive insight and vocal confidence. She and the quartet, which also includes Ed Cherry on guitar, Tony Reedus on drums and Barak Mori on bass, are a match made in pop-jazz heaven."

As that collaboration grew into a full-fledged partnership she performed most often with Mesterhazy's quartet of Barak Mori on bass, Jerome Jennings on drums, and Ed Cherry on guitar, in residencies at the Empire Plush Room and the Rrazz Room in San Francisco. They then established themselves at Yoshi's in San Francisco's revitalized Fillmore Jazz District, and in New York at The Jazz Standard where West, Mesterhazy and his Quartet recorded her first album in 11 years "Live at The Jazz Standard".

In February 2013, West returned to New York to appear with Wynton Marsalis and the Jazz at Lincoln Center Orchestra to perform in Blood on the Fields for which he won a Pulitzer Prize.

== Discography ==
- Temptation (Noir, 1997)
- Restless (Noir, 1999)
- Come What May (Hi Horse, 2001)
- Live at Jazz Standard (Hi Horse, 2012)
