= Ken Schaphorst =

American composer

Ken Schaphorst (born May 24, 1960 in Abington, Pennsylvania) is a composer, performer, and educator.

== Career ==
Schaphorst served as Director of Jazz Studies at Lawrence University in Appleton, Wisconsin for ten years, before returning to Boston to become Chairman of the Jazz Studies Department at New England Conservatory of Music in 2001. In addition to composing and arranging, Schaphorst is a trumpet player and flugelhornist.

Schaphorst is also a founding member of the Jazz Composers Alliance, a Boston-based non-profit corporation promoting new music in the jazz idiom since 1985. During this period, Schaphorst also co-led the True Colors Big Band with saxophonist Rob Scheps in Boston.

Schaphorst studied at Swarthmore College, New England Conservatory of Music, and Boston University, where he received the Doctor of Musical Arts in 1990. His composition teachers have included Thomas Oboe Lee, Gerald Levinson, William Thomas McKinley and Bernard Rands.

Schaphorst was awarded composition fellowships from the National Endowment for the Arts in 1988 and 1991, the Wisconsin Arts Board in 1997, Meet the Composer Grants in 1987 and 1997, and was a Music Composition finalist in the Massachusetts Fellowship Program in 1986.

== Discography ==
- Making Lunch, Ken Schaphorst Big Band (Accurate Records, AC-4201, 1990)
- After Blue (Accurate Records, AC-4202, 1991)
- When the Moon Jumps, Ken Schaphorst Ensemble (Accurate Records, AC-4203, 1993)
- Over the Rainbow, Schaphorst arranger, producer (artists: Medeski, Martin & Wood, Either/Orchestra, the Charlie Kohlhaase Quintet, Perfumed Scorpion) (Accurate Records, AC-4204, 1997)
- Purple, Ken Schaphorst Big Band (Naxos, 1999)
- Premieres 2000 (Mark Masters, 2001)
- Indigenous Technology, Ken Schaphorst, trumpet, Matt Turner, cello, Dane Richeson, percussion (Accurate Records, AC-5049, 2002)
- How to Say Goodbye, Ken Schaphorst Big Band (JCA Recordings, 2017)
