= Papillon Records =

Record label

- Parent company: Chrysalis Group
- Founded: 1999
- Distributor: EMI Music Distribution
- Genre: Various
- Country of origin: UK
- Official website: www.papillon.com (Site Closed)

Papillon Records was a record label started by the Chrysalis Group (who had sold their Chrysalis Records division to EMI) in 1999 with longtime Chrysalis act Jethro Tull. Whilst Echo Records was formed to provide an outlet by new and independent developing acts, Papillon Records was set up as a competitor to such groups as Eagle Rock Entertainment and Sanctuary Records signing 'heritage acts' – that is already long-term recording artists with large, loyal fanbases – such as The Human League and Deacon Blue. However, after a number of album releases failed to sell, it was decided in 2001 that Papillon would not sign anymore acts. The label quickly became insolvent and was closed by the Chrysalis Group in 2002. A subsidiary 'The Hit Label' was left to trade just to deal with back catalogue.

== Artists ==
- Cliff Richard
- Jimmy Nail

== In the media ==
The label grabbed headlines in 1999 by releasing "The Millennium Prayer", a single by Cliff Richard.

== See also ==
- Lists of record labels
