= Sheena Easton discography =

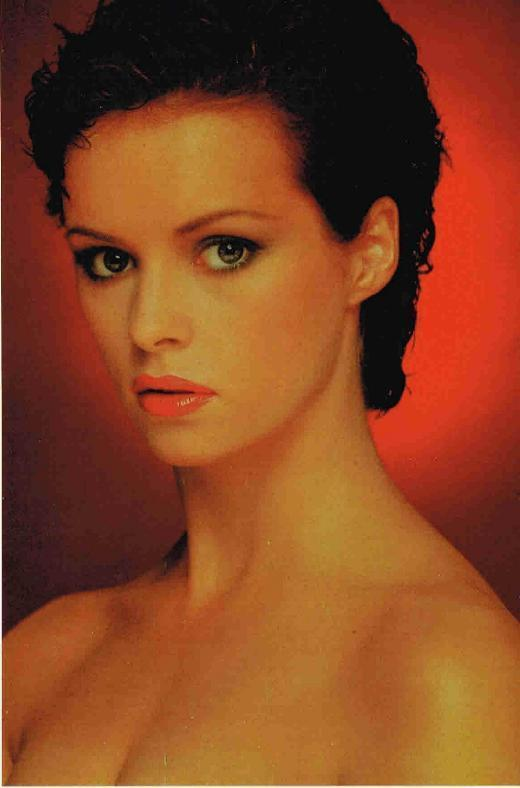
- Easton in 1981
- Studio albums: 16
- Live albums: 2
- Compilation albums: 16
- Singles: 55
- Video albums: 5
- Music videos: 28
- Box sets: 4

The discography of Scottish singer and songwriter Sheena Easton consists of sixteen studio albums, sixteen compilation albums, fifty-five single, two live albums and four box sets. Her debut single, "Modern Girl" was released in February 1980, and peaked at number 8 on the UK Singles Charts and number 18 on the Billboard Hot 100 in the United States. The follow–up single performed stronger, particularly in the United States where it reached number 1 on the Billboard Hot 100 and subsequently certified Gold by the Recording Industry Association of America (RIAA). Her debut album Take My Time was released in 1981, and was released in the United States as Sheena Easton. It performed well commercially, earning Gold certifications in both Canada and the United States, and spawned an additional three singles – "One Man Woman", "Take My Time" and "When He Shines".

By mid–1981, she had recorded and released "For Your Eyes Only" as the theme for the James Bond movie of the same name. It was nominated for an Academy Award for Best Original Song at the 54th Academy Awards and Golden Globe Award for Best Original Song at the 39th Golden Globe Awards in 1982, and reached the top ten on the UK Singles Charts and Billboard Hot 100, whilst peaking at number 1 in both the Netherlands and Norway. Moderate success followed with the release of Madness, Money & Music (1982), a trend which continued until the release of her fifth album A Private Heaven in 1984 which saw Easton adopt a more "sexy pop singer" appearance. Her new look resulted in a revival and return to commercial prominence for Easton, particularly with the single releases "Strut" and "Sugar Walls", both of which reached the top ten on the Billboard Hot 100.

Her prominence, particularly in the United States during the mid–1980s, lead to recording collaborations with Kenny Rogers and Prince, the latter in which had previously written "Sugar Walls" under his pseudonym Alexander Nevermind. In 1987, Easton and Prince released "U Got the Look" which reached number 2 on the Billboard Hot 100 and number 11 on the UK Singles Charts. Easton's ninth album, The Lover in Me (1988), was produced by prominent R&B producers including Babyface, Angela Winbush, L.A. Reid and Prince, and as a result marked a shift towards a more R&B and urban sound than her previous releases. It became her first charting album in the United Kingdom in five years, whilst it continued a period of commercial success for Easton in the United States. Similarly, the title track reached number 2 on the Billboard Hot 100, whilst in the United Kingdom it peaked at number 15. Her tenth album, What Comes Naturally, was released in 1991, before Easton began a decline in sales and popularity, beginning with No Strings (1993).

In 2000, she attempted a comeback with the album Fabulous which spawned the single "Giving Up, Giving In" that reached number 54 on the UK Singles Charts. Credited as an "80s pop phenomenon" by The New York Times, she has been regarded across the industry as one of the most defining and recognisable voices of the 1980s, with estimated record sales worldwide of over 20 million. She became the first artist in Billboard history to have a top-five hit on each of the Billboard primary singles charts.

== Albums ==
=== Studio albums ===
Title	Album details	Peak chart positions										Certifications
Title	Album details	UK	AUS	CAN	FIN	GER	JPN	NL	NOR	SWE	US	Certifications
Take My Time (Note: Released as Sheena Easton in North America.)	Released: 19 January 1981; Label: EMI; Formats: LP, MC, 8-track	17	57	12	24	—	4	—	33	22	24	UK: Gold; CAN: Platinum; US: Gold
You Could Have Been with Me	Released: 21 September 1981; Label: EMI; Formats: LP, MC, 8-track	33	—	35	12	52	7	22	7	2	47	UK: Silver; CAN: Platinum; US: Gold
Madness, Money & Music	Released: September 1982; Label: EMI; Formats: LP, MC	44	94	73	11	—	5	47	5	19	85	CAN: Gold
Best Kept Secret	Released: August 1983; Label: EMI; Formats: CD, LP, MC, 8-track	99	—	38	27	—	4	—	5	38	33	CAN: Gold
Todo Me Recuerda a Ti	Released: 23 November 1984; Label: Odeon, EMI; Formats: CD, LP, MC	—	—	—	—	—	30	—	—	—	—	
A Private Heaven	Released: 21 September 1984; Label: EMI; Formats: CD, LP, MC, 8-track	—	88	32	—	—	9	—	—	—	15	CAN: Platinum; US: Gold & Platinum
Do You	Released: November 1985; Label: EMI; Formats: CD, LP, MC	—	—	66	—	—	32	—	—	—	40	US: Gold
No Sound But a Heart	Released: 17 July 1987; Label: EMI; Formats: CD, LP, MC	—	—	—	—	—	59	—	—	—	—	
The Lover in Me	Released: November 1988; Label: MCA; Formats: CD, LP, MC	30	94	81	—	48	—	9	—	20	44	US: Gold
What Comes Naturally	Released: 16 April 1991; Label: MCA; Formats: CD, MC	—	38	—	—	—	85	50	—	41	90	
No Strings	Released: 13 August 1993; Label: MCA; Formats: CD, MC	—	160	—	—	—	80	—	—	—	—	
My Cherie	Released: 14 March 1995; Label: MCA; Formats: CD, MC	—	—	—	—	—	30	—	—	—	—	
Freedom	Released: 23 April 1997; Label: MCA, Fuel 2000; Formats: CD, MC	—	—	—	—	—	53	—	—	—	—	
Home	Released: 20 March 1999; Label: Universal; Formats: CD	—	—	—	—	—	97	—	—	—	—	
Fabulous	Released: 13 November 2000; Label: Universal; Formats: CD, MC	185	95	—	—	—	65	—	—	52	—	
"—" denotes releases that did not chart or were not released in that territory.

=== Compilation albums ===
Title	Album details	Peak chart positions
Title	Album details	JPN
Best Now	Released: 6 April 1988; Label: EMI; Formats: CD, MC; Japan-only release	—
For Your Eyes Only: The Best of Sheena Easton	Released: 13 March 1989; Label: EMI; Formats: CD, LP, MC	—
The Best of Sheena Easton	Released: 1989; Label: EMI; Formats: CD, MC; North America-only release	—
The World of Sheena Easton: The Singles Collection	Released: April 1993; Label: EMI; Formats: CD	—
Greatest Hits: 10 Best Series	Released: April 1995; Label: CEMA Special Markets; Formats: CD, MC	—
Greatest Hits	Released: 21 October 1995; Label: MCA; Formats: CD; Japan-only release	98
The Gold Collection	Released: March 1996; Label: EMI; Formats: CD	—
Best Ballads	Released: 16 March 2000; Label: MCA; Formats: CD; Japan-only release	—
Classic Masters	Released: July 2002; Label: EMI/Capitol; Formats: CD; US-only release	—
The Sheena Easton Collection	Released: 2002; Label: HMV EASY; Formats: CD	—
The Best of Sheena Easton	Released: August 2008; Label: EMI; Formats: CD	—
The Collection	Released: 16 April 2012; Label: Music Club Deluxe; Formats: 2×CD	—
Original Album Series	Released: 24 November 2014; Label: Warner Music/Parlophone; Formats: 5×CD	—
The Definitive Singles 1980–1987	Released: 17 September 2021; Label: Cherry Pop; Formats: 3×CD	—
The Definitive 12" Singles 1983–1987	Released: 23 April 2022; Label: Cherry Pop; Formats: 2×LP	—
The Essential 7" Singles 1980–1987	Released: 22 April 2023; Label: Cherry Pop; Formats: 2×LP	—
Modern Girl: The Complete EMI Recordings Vol I	Released: 23 May 2025; Label: Cherry Pop; Formats: 5xCD	—
Strut: The Complete EMI Recordings Vol II	Released: 31 Oct 2025; Label: Cherry Pop; Formats: 5xCD + DVD	—
The Singles 1980-1987	Released: 19 June 2026; Label: Cherry Pop; Formats: 25xCD	—
"—" denotes releases that did not chart or were not released in that territory.

== Singles ==
Title	Year	Peak chart positions										Certifications	Album
Title	Year	UK	AUS	CAN	GER	IRE	JPN	NL	NZ	US	US AC	Certifications	Album
"Modern Girl" (Note: "Modern Girl", although released first, reached its peak position in all territories after the success of "9 to 5 (Morning Train)". When originally released, it peaked at number 56 in UK.)	1980	8	24	22	—	10	18	—	—	18	13	UK: Silver	Take My Time
"9 to 5 (Morning Train)"	1980	3	1	1	—	2	17	14	1	1	1	UK: Gold; CAN: Gold; US: Gold	Take My Time
"One Man Woman"	1980	14	—	—	—	5	—	—	—	—	—		Take My Time
"Take My Time"	1981	44	—	—	64	—	—	—	50	—	—		Take My Time
"When He Shines"	1981	12	—	—	—	9	—	—	—	30	13		Take My Time
"For Your Eyes Only"	1981	8	6	5	5	11	22	1	4	4	6	CAN: Gold	For Your Eyes Only (soundtrack)
"Just Another Broken Heart"	1981	33	—	—	—	—	—	—	—	—	—		You Could Have Been with Me
"You Could Have Been with Me"	1981	54	—	13	—	—	46	14	—	15	6		You Could Have Been with Me
"A Little Tenderness" (Note: "A Little Tenderness" was only released as a single in Japan, Germany and the Netherlands.)	1982	—	—	—	58	—	58	29	—	—	—		You Could Have Been with Me
"Machinery"	1982	38	—	—	—	29	52	48	—	57	—		Madness, Money & Music
"Are You Man Enough"	1982	—	—	—	—	—	—	—	—	—	—		Madness, Money & Music
"I Wouldn't Beg for Water" (Note: "I Wouldn't Beg for Water" was only released as a single in the US and Canada.)	1982	—	—	—	—	—	—	—	—	64	19		Madness, Money & Music
"Ice Out in the Rain" (Note: "Ice Out in the Rain" was only as a single in the Netherlands.)	1982	—	—	—	—	—	—	21	—	—	—		Madness, Money & Music
"We've Got Tonight" (with Kenny Rogers)	1983	28	11	4	56	18	—	24	13	6	2		We've Got Tonight (by Rogers)
"Telefone (Long Distance Love Affair)"	1983	84	54	3	—	—	46	—	—	9	15	CAN: Gold	Best Kept Secret
"Almost Over You"	1983	89	68	35	—	—	—	—	—	25	4		Best Kept Secret
"Devil in a Fast Car" (Note: "Devil in a Fast Car" was only released as a single in the US, Canada and Japan.)	1984	—	—	—	—	—	95	—	—	79	—		Best Kept Secret
"Me Gustas Tal Como Eres" (with Luis Miguel) (Note: "Me Gustas Tal Como Eres" was only released as a single in Japan, Portugal and Latin America.)	1984	—	—	—	—	—	—	—	—	—	—		Todo Me Recuerda a Ti
"La Noche y Tú" (with Dyango) (Note: "La Noche y Tú" was only released as a single in Spain and Latin America.)	1984	—	—	—	—	—	—	—	—	—	—		Todo Me Recuerda a Ti
"Hungry Eyes" (Note: "Hungry Eyes" was only released as a single in Japan.)	1984	—	—	—	—	—	83	—	—	—	—		A Private Heaven
"Back in the City"	1984	121	—	—	—	—	—	—	—	—	—		A Private Heaven
"Strut"	1984	110	13	7	21	—	72	—	8	7	—	CAN: Gold	A Private Heaven
"Sugar Walls"	1984	95	87	27	57	—	—	—	30	9	—		A Private Heaven
"Swear" (Note: "Swear" was only released as a single in the US, Canada and Continental Europe.)	1985	—	—	—	—	—	—	—	—	80	—		A Private Heaven
"Do It for Love"	1985	117	—	64	—	—	—	—	—	29	39		Do You
"Jimmy Mack" (Note: "Jimmy Mack" was only released as a single in the US, Canada, Japan and Germany.)	1986	—	—	—	—	—	—	—	—	65	—		Do You
"Magic of Love" (Note: "Magic of Love" was only released as a single in the US, Canada, Australia, South Africa and France.)	1986	—	—	—	—	—	—	—	—	—	—		Do You
"So Far So Good" (Note: "So Far So Good" was only released as a single in the US, Canada, Australasia, Japan and Continental Europe.)	1986	—	—	—	—	—	—	—	—	43	35		About Last Night (soundtrack)
"It's Christmas All Over the World"	1986	—	—	—	—	—	—	—	—	—	—		Santa Claus: The Movie (soundtrack)
"Eternity"	1987	—	—	—	—	—	—	—	—	—	—		No Sound But a Heart
"The Lover in Me"	1988	15	91	17	26	12	—	11	—	2	43		The Lover in Me
"Days Like This"	1989	43	—	—	—	—	—	—	—	—	—		The Lover in Me
"101"	1989	54	—	—	—	—	—	—	—	—	—		The Lover in Me
"No Deposit, No Return" (Note: "No Deposit, No Return" was only released as a single in the US.)	1989	—	—	—	—	—	—	—	—	—	—		The Lover in Me
"The Arms of Orion" (with Prince)	1989	27	108	61	—	5	—	13	44	36	21		Batman (by Prince)
"Follow My Rainbow" (Note: "Follow My Rainbow" was only released as a single in the US and Continental Europe.)	1989	—	—	—	—	—	—	14	—	—	—		The Lover in Me
"What Comes Naturally"	1991	77	4	48	—	—	—	19	—	19	—		What Comes Naturally
"You Can Swing It" (Note: "You Can Swing It" was only released as a single in the US, Australia and Continental Europe.)	1991	—	107	—	—	—	—	54	—	—	—		What Comes Naturally
"To Anyone" (Note: "To Anyone" was only released as a single in the US and Germany.)	1991	—	—	—	—	—	—	—	—	—	—		What Comes Naturally
"A Dream Worth Keeping" (Note: "A Dream Worth Keeping" was only released as a promotional single in the US.)	1992	—	—	—	—	—	—	—	—	—	—		FernGully: The Last Rainforest (soundtrack)
"The Nearness of You" (Note: "The Nearness of You" was only released as a promotional single in Europe.)	1993	—	—	—	—	—	—	—	—	—	—		No Strings
"The Miracle of Love" (Note: "The Miracle of Love" was only released as a single in Japan.)	1993	—	—	—	—	—	—	—	—	—	—		N/A
"My Cherie" (Note: "My Cherie" was only released as a single in the US and Japan.)	1995	—	—	—	—	—	—	—	—	—	—		My Cherie
"Too Much in Love" (Note: "Too Much in Love" was only released as a promotional single in Japan.)	1995	—	—	—	—	—	—	—	—	—	—		My Cherie
"Flower in the Rain" (Note: "Flower in the Rain" was only released as a single in France.)	1995	—	—	—	—	—	—	—	—	—	—		My Cherie
"Modern Girl '97" (Note: "Modern Girl '97" was only released as a single in Japan.)	1997	—	—	—	—	—	—	—	—	—	—		Freedom
"Love Me with Freedom" (Note: "Love Me with Freedom" was only released as a single in Japan.)	1997	—	—	—	—	—	—	—	—	—	—		Freedom
"When You Speak My Name" (Note: "When You Speak My Name" was only released as a single in Japan.)	1997	—	—	—	—	—	—	—	—	—	—		Freedom
"The Place Where We Belong" (with Jeffrey Osborne) (Note: "The Place Where We Belong" was only released as a promotional single in the US.)	1998	—	—	—	—	—	—	—	—	—	—		The Colors of Christmas (various artists)
"Carry a Dream" (Note: "Carry a Dream" was only released as a single in Japan.)	1999	—	—	—	—	—	—	—	—	—	—		Home
"My Treasure Is You" (Note: "My Treasure Is You" was only released as a single in Japan.)	1999	—	—	—	—	—	—	—	—	—	—		Home
"Giving Up Giving In"	2000	54	78	—	—	—	—	—	—	—	—		Fabulous
"Can't Take My Eyes Off You" (Note: "Can't Take My Eyes Off You" was only released as a single in Japan.)	2001	—	—	—	—	—	—	—	—	—	—		Fabulous
"Love Is in Control" (Note: "Love Is in Control" was only released as a promotional single.)	2001	—	—	—	—	—	—	—	—	—	—		Fabulous
"Anything Can Happen" / "Sweet Talker" (Note: "Anything Can Happen" was only released as double-A side bonus single with 2023 Record Store Day album release.)	2023	—	—	—	—	—	—	—	—	—	—		The Essential 7" Singles 1980-1987
"—" denotes releases that did not chart or were not released in that territory.

== Songwriting ==
- "Moody (My Love)" – 1981, written by Sheena Easton and Christopher Neil
- "Straight Talking" – 1984, written by S. Easton, G. Mathieson, T. Veitch, A. Loboriel
- "Shockwave" – 1987, written by Sheena Easton, Narada Michael Walden, and Jesse Johnson
- "La, La, La, He, He, Hee" – 1987, written by Sheena Easton and Prince
- "Love '89" – 1989, written by Sheena Easton and Prince
- "The Arms of Orion" – 1989, written by Sheena Easton and Prince (US #36 UK#27)
- "The First Touch of Love" – 1991, written by Sheena Easton and Ian Prince
- "Half a Heart" – 1991, written by Sheena Easton, Oliver Leiber, and Derek Bramble
- "The Next Time" – 1991, written by Sheena Easton and David Frank
- "The Miracle of Love" – 1993, written by Sheena Easton and Chika Ueda
- "Flower in the Rain" – 1995, written by Sheena Easton, Arnie Roman, and Tina Shafer
- "Love Will Make You Wise" – 1997, written by Sheena Easton and Cliff Magness
- "One Man" – 1997, written by Sheena Easton, Carol Bayer Sager, and Cliff Magness

== Music videos ==
Year	Title
1980	"9-5 (Morning Train)"
1980	"Modern Girl"
1980	"One Man Woman"
1981	"For Your Eyes Only"
1981	"Just Another Broken Heart"
1981	"You Could Have Been with Me"
1982	"Machinery"
1982	"Ice Out in the Rain"
1983	"We've Got Tonight" (Duet with Kenny Rogers)
1983	"Telefone (Long Distance Love Affair)"
1983	"Almost Over You"
1984	"Back In The City"
1984	"Strut"
1984	"Sugar Walls"
1984	"Swear"
1985	"Do It for Love"
1985	"Jimmy Mack"
1985	"Magic of Love"
1985	"It's Christmas All Over The World"
1986	"So Far, So Good"
1987	"Eternity"
1987	"U Got the Look" (Duet with Prince)
1988	"The Lover in Me"
1989	"Days Like This"
1989	"101"
1989	"Follow My Rainbow" (Promo Video)
1991	"What Comes Naturally"
2000	"Giving Up, Giving In"
2000	"Love Is in Control"

== Video and live compilations ==
- Sheena Easton, Live at the Palace, Hollywood (1982, US), Re-released on DVD/CD boxset (2022).
- Sony Video 45 (1983, US)
- Sheena Easton: Act 1 television special (1983, US)
- Sony Video 45 (1984, US)
- For Your Eyes Only: The Best of Sheena Easton (1989, UK)
- Star Portrait: Sheena Easton (1989, UK)
- Sheena Easton: 7 Minute Stomach workout video (1993, US)
- Sheena Easton: Body Blade Workout promo (1994, US)
- Sheena Easton: Pop Princesses documentary (2000, UK)
- Sheena Easton: Never Can Say Goodbye documentary (2000, UK)
