= One Man Woman (Sheena Easton song) =

Single by Sheena Easton

from the album Take My Time
- B-side: "Summer's Over"
- Released: October 1980
- Recorded: 1980
- Genre: Pop
- Label: EMI (original), RT Industries (current)
- Songwriters: Mike Leeson; Peter Vale
- Producer: Christopher Neil

Sheena Easton singles chronology
"9 to 5" (1980)	"One Man Woman" (1980)	"Take My Time" (1981)

"One Man Woman" is a 1980 song recorded by Scottish singer Sheena Easton. Although never released as a single in the United States, it was Easton's third single in Europe. The song was written by Mick Leeson and Peter Vale, and produced by Christopher Neil.

== Background ==
Following her launch on the TV show The Big Time, Pop Singer, Easton shot to success during the summer of 1980 with two top ten hits; "9 to 5" and "Modern Girl". In October, the third single "One Man Woman" was released. It was also a success peaking at #14 in the UK and #5 in Ireland. The song was backed by the ballad "Summer's Over" on the B-Side. Like her previous two singles, this was again produced by Christopher Neil and recorded at AIR Studios in London. The song was later included on her debut album, Take My Time, released early the following year. The video for the single featured Easton during a photo shoot.

In November 1980, Easton was invited to appear at The Royal Variety Performance to sing for the Queen. Despite this song being currently in the charts at the time, Easton instead sang "When He Shines", a song from her upcoming album.

== Track listing ==
1. "One Man Woman" (3.07)
2. "Summer's Over" (3.25)

== Charts ==
Chart (1980)	Peak position
Luxembourg (Radio Luxembourg)	9
UK Singles Chart	14
Irish Singles Chart	5
