= Todo Me Recuerda a Ti =

Studio album by Sheena Easton
- Released: November 23, 1984
- Recorded: 1983–1984
- Genre: Latin; dance-pop
- Label: Odeon (US, original); EMI Latin (reissue; international)
- Producer: Greg Mathieson, Juan Carlos Calderón

Sheena Easton chronology
A Private Heaven (1984)	Todo Me Recuerda a Ti (1984)	Do You (1985)

Todo Me Recuerda a Ti (Spanish for "Everything Reminds Me of You") is the sixth studio album by the Scottish singer Sheena Easton. It was released on 23 November 1984 and reissued by Capitol/EMI Latin in 1989. This is an album of greatest hits featuring three new tracks ("Ámame", "Una Vez En La Vida", and "Me Gustas Tal Como Eres") all sung in Spanish and geared for the Latin markets. "Me Gustas Tal Como Eres", a duet with Mexican star Luis Miguel, was released as the first single and earned Easton a Grammy for Best Mexican-American Performance - 1984.

The album includes a second single "La Noche Y Tú" ("We've Got Tonight"), a duet with Dyango, a Spanish vocalist. It is a cover of Easton's English-language version of the same song, in which she duetted with Kenny Rogers. The album also features "Mi Corazón Vuela" ("The Wind Beneath My Wings").

The album was produced by Greg Mathieson and Juan Carlos Calderón and was certified gold in Mexico and Argentina.

RT Industries released Todo Me Recuerda a Ti in digital format on 24 July 2019. This is the first time it was released since the Capitol/EMI Latin re-issue in 1989. On March 29, 2024 U.S. RT Industries with U.K. Cherry Pop Records released a vinyl remastered version of the album pressed on powdered blue vinyl for its 40th anniversary.

== Track listing ==
1. "Teléfono" ("Telefone") (Greg Mathieson, Trevor Veitch, Juan Carlos Calderón)
2. "Todo Me Recuerda a Ti" ("Almost Over You") (Calderón)
3. "Ámame" (Calderón)
4. "La Noche y Tú" ("We've Got Tonight") - duet with Dyango (Bob Seger, Calderón)
5. "El Primer Tren" ("9 to 5") (Florrie Palmer, Calderón)
6. "Una Vez en la Vida" ("Once in a Lifetime") (Calderón)
7. "Mi Corazón Vuela" ("The Wind Beneath My Wings") (Jeff Silbar, Larry Henley, Calderón)
8. "Me Gustas Tal Como Eres" - duet with Luis Miguel (Calderón)
9. "No Puedes Dejarme Así" ("Don't Leave Me This Way") (Calderón)
10. "Brindo por un Amor" ("You Could Have Been With Me") (Calderón)

== Production ==
- Producer – Greg Mathieson, Juan Carlos Calderón
- Engineer (Hollywood) – David Leonard
- Engineer (Madrid) – Joaquín Torres

== Charts ==
Chart performance for Todo Me Recuerda a Ti
Chart (1984)	Peak position
Argentina (CAPIF)	9
Japanese Albums (Oricon)	30

== Certifications and sales ==
Certifications for Todo Me Recuerda a Ti
Region	Certification	Certified units/sales
Argentina (CAPIF)	Gold	30,000^{^}
Mexico (AMPROFON)	Gold	100,000^{^}
^{^} Shipments figures based on certification alone.
