= It's Christmas =

It's Christmas may refer to:

- It's Christmas, a 2025 album by Eric Benét
- It's Christmas (Ledisi album), 2008
- It's Christmas (Mandisa album), 2008
- It's Christmas (No Angels album), 2025
- It's Christmas (Planetshakers album), 2019
- "It's Christmas (All Over the World)", a 1985 song by Sheena Easton
