= What Comes Naturally (song) =

1991 single by Sheena Easton

Single by Sheena Easton

from the album What Comes Naturally
- Released: 1991
- Length: 4:32
- Label: MCA
- Songwriters: Antonina Armato; Gina Go-Go; Nick Mundy
- Producers: Nick Mundy; Denny Diante

Sheena Easton singles chronology
| "Follow My Rainbow" (1989) | "What Comes Naturally" (1991) | "You Can Swing It" (1991) |

Music video
- "What Comes Naturally" on YouTube

"What Comes Naturally" is a song by Scottish singer Sheena Easton, released in 1991 by MCA Records as a single from her 10th album, What Comes Naturally (1991). It was written by Antonina Armato, Gina Go-Go and Nick Mundy. Mundy produced it with Denny Diante. The single reached number four in Australia and number 19 in the United States. The accompanying music video was directed by British director Andy Morahan.

== Charts ==
=== Weekly charts ===
| Chart (1991) | Peak position |
|---|---|
| Australia (ARIA) | 4 |
| Canada Top Singles (RPM) | 48 |
| Netherlands (Dutch Top 40) | 12 |
| Netherlands (Single Top 100) | 19 |
| UK Airplay (Music Week) | 40 |
| UK Dance (Music Week) | 49 |
| US Billboard Hot 100 | 19 |
| US Dance Club Songs (Billboard) | 39 |
| US Dance Singles Sales (Billboard) | 13 |
| US Hot R&B/Hip-Hop Songs (Billboard) | 39 |

=== Year-end charts ===
| Chart (1991) | Position |
|---|---|
| Australia (ARIA) | 69 |
