= 9 to 5 (Sheena Easton song) =

- UK single sleeve

Single by Sheena Easton

from the album Take My Time
- B-side: "Calm Before the Storm"
- Released: 16 May 1980 (UK); February 1981 (US)
- Recorded: 1979
- Genre: Pop
- Length: 3:20
- Label: EMI (original); RT Industries (current)
- Songwriter: Florrie Palmer
- Producer: Christopher Neil

Sheena Easton singles chronology
"Modern Girl" (1980)	"9 to 5" (1980)	"One Man Woman" (1980)

Alternative cover art
- US single sleeve

"9 to 5" (or "Morning Train") is a song by Scottish singer Sheena Easton from her 1981 album Take My Time. It was written by Florrie Palmer and recorded and released as a single in 1980, becoming Easton's biggest hit. It peaked at number three on the UK Singles Chart in August 1980 and was certified gold. In February 1981, it was released in the United States and Canada under the title "Morning Train (Nine to Five)" to avoid confusion with Dolly Parton's recent hit "9 to 5". It reached number one in both countries, becoming Easton's only chart-topper in those nations.

== Background ==
Easton had released one single prior to "9 to 5": "Modern Girl". This had failed to chart highly, but after exposure on the BBC documentary The Big Time: Pop Singer, both "9 to 5" and "Modern Girl" were propelled into the top ten at the same time, making her the fourth female artist (after Ruby Murray, Shirley Bassey, and Donna Summer) to achieve this feat. "9 to 5" became a top three UK hit and was one of the best-selling singles of the year.

== Release and writing ==
Early in 1981, EMI Records decided to launch Easton in the US and released "9 to 5" as her debut single. Easton's song went to #1 on both the U.S. pop and adult contemporary charts; it remained at the top for two weeks on Billboard's pop chart, becoming Easton's only chart-topper. On Billboard's 1981 year-end charts, it came in as the twelfth-biggest pop and thirteenth-biggest AC hit of the year 1981. It topped the RPM magazine pop and AC charts in Canada, and also reached #1 in New Zealand.

The song is about a woman who waits at home all day for her man to come home from work. The music video was filmed on the Bluebell Railway, a heritage line running between East and West Sussex in England. The video stars London and South Western Railway No. 488, a preserved LSWR 0415 Class locomotive.

== In popular culture ==
The documentary John Peel's Record Box revealed that British radio DJ John Peel loved the record so much that he kept two copies of it in a small wooden box of his 142 favourite singles.

The song was featured twice in the NBC sitcom Seinfeld. It first appeared in a scene from the season 8 episode "The Bizarro Jerry"', in a montage of Kramer's "work" experience. Its second appearance was in the season 9 episode "The Butter Shave", where George Costanza 'commutes' to work at Play Now.

In 2004, Easton recorded an advert for Australian Railway Company Connex Melbourne. It featured passengers singing the song in the train carriage, which pulls up to Burnley railway station, where Easton boarded the train.

The song also appears in the 2004 teen comedy EuroTrip. Two of the film's protagonists played by Scott Mechlowicz and Jacob Pitts enter a fictional British pub called the Fiesty (sic) Goat in London, unaware that it is a private Manchester United football supporters' bar. They are forced to sing the song when confronted by a group of football hooligans and their leader, performed by Vinnie Jones. The original song is also played during the scene.

== Charts ==
=== Weekly charts ===
Chart (1980–1981)	Peak position
Argentina	4
Australia (Kent Music Report)	1
Belgium (Ultratop 50 Flanders)	8
Canada Top Singles (RPM)	1
Canada Adult Contemporary (RPM)	1
France (IFOP)	4
Ireland (IRMA)	2
Luxembourg (Radio Luxembourg)	7
Netherlands (Dutch Top 40)	14
Netherlands (Single Top 100)	18
New Zealand (Recorded Music NZ)	1
South Africa (Springbok Radio)	11
Spain (AFYVE)	21
Switzerland (Schweizer Hitparade)	3
UK Singles (OCC)	3
US Billboard Hot 100	1
US Radio & Records CHR/Pop Airplay Chart	3
US Adult Contemporary (Billboard)	1
US Cash Box Top 100	1

Chart (2008)	Peak position
Japan (Japan Hot 100)	98

=== Year-end charts ===
Chart (1980)	Rank
UK	9

Chart (1981)	Rank
Australia (Kent Music Report)	7
Canada	14
New Zealand	12
US Billboard	12
US Cash Box Top 100	24

== Certifications ==
Certifications for "9 to 5"
Region	Certification	Certified units/sales
New Zealand (RMNZ)	Gold	15,000^{‡}
United Kingdom (BPI)	Gold	500,000^{^}
^{^} Shipments figures based on certification alone.^{‡} Sales+streaming figures based on certification alone.

== Other well-known versions ==
The Swedish-born Norwegian singer Elisabeth Andreassen covered the song in Swedish, as "Han pendlar varje dag" ("He commutes every day") with new lyrics by Olle Bergman, on her 1981 album Angel of the Morning. This version stayed at Svensktoppen for nine weeks from 21 February to 18 April 1982, with a chart peak of number 4.

Michel Mallory adapted this song for the french singer Sylvie Vartan in 1981 named L'amour c'est comme une cigarette. This song was released in the album Ça va mal, and became one of the most successful title of her carrieer.

== See also ==
- List of Cashbox Top 100 number-one singles of 1981
- List of Billboard Hot 100 number ones of 1981
- List of train songs
