= Fabulous (album) =

Studio album by Sheena Easton
- Released: 13 November 2000
- Recorded: London; Las Vegas
- Genre: Hi-NRG; dance
- Label: Universal
- Producer: Ian Masterson; Terry Ronald; Tony Swain

Sheena Easton chronology
Home (1999)	Fabulous (2000)

Singles from Fabulous
- 1. "Giving Up, Giving In" Released: 27 November 2000; 2. "Can't Take My Eyes Off You" Released: 21 April 2001

Professional ratings
Review scores
Source	Rating
AllMusic	3/5 stars

Fabulous is the fifteenth studio album by Scottish singer Sheena Easton, released in November 2000. The album charted in the UK at number 185 and contains Euro Hi-NRG cover versions of hit songs from the 1970s and '80s, most of them disco classics. The album also contains two original compositions.

== Release ==
The first single released from the album was a cover of "Giving Up Giving In", which had originally been a hit for the Three Degrees in 1978. Easton's version was less successful, peaking at number 54 on the UK Singles Chart. "Don't Leave Me This Way" is a different song than the track featured on Easton's 1983 album, "Best Kept Secret". A second single was released in 2001, a cover of Donna Summer's 1982 hit "Love Is in Control" with double A-side "Don't Leave Me This Way" with an accompanying video that was taken from footage of Easton's album launch concert at G-A-Y nightclub in London. However, this too was unsuccessful and shelved indefinitely.

In Japan, Fabulous was released in February 2001 and the first single was "Can't Take My Eyes Off You" which had originally been recorded by Frankie Valli in the 1960s, though a disco version had been a hit for Boys Town Gang in the early 1980s. The album was packaged differently from the UK version and included two bonus tracks; "I Need Your Lovin'" (a cover of the 1980 Teena Marie song) and a remix of "Can't Take My Eyes Off You". In Australia, Fabulous was released on 24 February 2001 and Easton was asked to perform songs from the album to close out 2001 Sydney Gay and Lesbian Mardi Gras ceremonies. Remixes of the singles were produced by Joey Negro, Sleaze Sisters, Sharp Boys, Rob Searle, DJ Soma Grow and Almighty. The album was a commercial failure in the UK, though the album did enjoy mild success in dance clubs in London, Japan, and Australia. The album was only released throughout continental Europe, Japan, Australia, and Argentina.

On 9 August 2021, Fabulous was added for streaming on both Apple Music and Spotify in the US market.

== Track listing ==
1. "Don't Leave Me This Way" (Cary Gilbert, Kenneth Gamble, Leon Huff) (originally by Harold Melvin & the Bluenotes) – 5:25
2. "Giving Up, Giving In" (Giorgio Moroder, Pete Bellotte) (originally by the Three Degrees) – 4:29
3. "Love Is in Control" (Merria Ross, Quincy Jones, Rod Temperton) (originally by Donna Summer) – 5:11
4. "That's What Friends Are For" (Deniece Williams, Fritz Baskett, Lani Groves) (originally by Deniece Williams) – 4:11
5. "Never Can Say Goodbye" (Clifton Davis) (originally by the Jackson 5) – 4:23
6. "Best of My Love" (Al McKay, Maurice White) (originally by the Emotions) – 3:10
7. "On My Own" [Duet with Terry Ronald] (Burt Bacharach, Carole Bayer Sager) (originally by Patti LaBelle & Michael McDonald) – 4:02
8. "Can't Take My Eyes Off You" (Bob Gaudio, Bob Crewe) (originally by Frankie Valli) – 4:16
9. "You Never Gave Me the Chance" (Ian Masterson, Terry Ronald) – 4:19
10. "Get Here to Me" (Ian Masterson, Terry Ronald) – 4:58

Japan bonus tracks

11. "I Need Your Lovin'" (originally by Teena Marie) – 5:53
12. "Can't Take My Eyes Off You" (DJ Soma Grow Sound Mix) – 8:28

== Personnel ==
=== Musicians ===
- Sheena Easton – lead vocals
- Ian Masterson – keyboards, programming
- James Sanger – additional programming
- Nick Naysmith – additional keyboards (4)
- Paul Watson – additional programming (6)
- Nick Bagnall – additional programming (9, 10)
- Christopher Slaski – acoustic piano
- James Nisbet – guitars
- Steve Smith – percussion
- Derek Watkins – trumpet solo (1, 10)
- Valerie Etienne – backing vocals (1, 3, 4, 7, 8)
- Paul Jason Fredericks – backing vocals (1, 3, 4, 7, 8)
- Terry Ronald – backing vocals (1, 3), lead vocals (7)
- Vicky James – backing vocals (2, 3, 5, 6, 8)
- Melanie Marshall – backing vocals (2, 3)
- Sylvia Mason-James – backing vocals (3, 5, 6, 8)
- Dee Lewis – backing vocals (7–10)

Brass and woodwinds

- Christopher Slaski – arrangements and conductor
- Nick Cartledge and Michael O'Donnell – flute
- Luke Annesley, Nigel Hitchcock and Howard McGill – saxophones
- Richard Edwards, Ian Moffat and Mark Nightingale – trombone
- John Barclay, Simon Gardner, Mike Lovatt, Steve Sidwell and Derek Watkins – trumpet

Strings

- Christopher Slaski – arrangements and conductor
- John Wilson – contractor
- Angus Meryon – copyist
- Daniel Gardner, Ben Lasserson, Andrew Skrimshire, Paul Watkins and Chris Worsey – cello
- David Ayre and Tom Croxon – double bass
- Lucy Wakeford – harp
- Jessamy Boyd, Rebecca Chambers, Chris Goldscheider and Robin Del Mar – viola
- Levine Andrade, Marcus Barcham-Stevens, Paul Barrit, Ian Belton, John Bradbury, Alan Brind, Sonya Fairbairn, Roger Garland, Chris George, Richard George, Peter Graham, Gareth Griffiths, Helen Hathorn, Andrew Haveron, Harry Kerr, Peter Manning, Rita Manning, Jonathan Morton, Padraic Savage, Matthew Scrivener, Ruth Williams, Paul Willey, Rolf Wilson, Yuri Zhislin and Warren Ziclinski – violin

=== Production ===
- Tony Swain – executive producer
- Ian Masterson – producer, mixing
- Terry Ronald – producer, vocal arrangements
- Laurence Diana – engineer
- Mike Ross-Trevor – brass and string recording
- Chris Gardener – assistant engineer
- Dino Esposito – vocal recording (1, 4–6)
- Scot Rammer – vocal recording (1, 4–6)
- Steve Baughman – vocal recording (2, 3, 7–10)
- Paul Wright – mixing
- Matt Crawford – mix assistant
- Tim Young – mastering
- Tessa Hallman – photography

Studios

- Produced for Luxury Planet
- Mixed at Sarm West Studios (London, UK)
- Mastered at Metropolis Mastering (London, UK)
- Recorded at the Strongroom and The Glamour Lounge (London, UK). Except Track 6 recorded at The Strongroom, Milo Studios and The Glamour Lounge (London, UK)
- Vocals recorded at Larrabee Sound Studios (North Hollywood, California, USA). Except Tracks 1 & 4–6 at The Compound (Las Vegas, Nevada, US)
- Strings and brass recorded at Whitfield Street (London, UK)

== Charts ==
Chart performance for Fabulous
Chart (2000–2001)	Peak position
Australian Albums (ARIA)	95
Japanese Albums (Oricon)	65
Swedish Albums (Sverigetopplistan)	52
UK Albums (OCC)	185
