= What Comes Naturally =

Studio album by Sheena Easton
- Released: 16 April 1991
- Recorded: 1990
- Studio: Obsession Studios, Oliver Leiber's house, Red Chamber Studios, Rumbo Recorders, Studio Masters, Studio Ultimo, Westlake Audio and Westlake Studios (Los Angeles, California); Conway Studios, The Grey Room and Summa Music Group (Hollywood, California); Larrabee Sound Studios and Oasis Recording Studios (North Hollywood, California); JHL Sound (Pacific Palisades, California); Science Lab (New York City, New York); Cove City Sound Studios (Glen Cove, New York)
- Genre: Pop; new jack swing; funk
- Length: 48:56
- Label: MCA
- Producer: Ric Wake; Vassal Benford; Ian Prince; Denny Diante; Oliver Leiber; Brent "Epic" Mazur & Richard Wolf; Nick Mundy

Sheena Easton chronology
The Lover in Me (1988)	What Comes Naturally (1991)	No Strings (1993)

Professional ratings
Review scores
Source	Rating
AllMusic	2/5 stars
Orlando Sentinel	2/5 stars

What Comes Naturally is the tenth studio album by the Scottish singer Sheena Easton, released in 1991 through MCA Records. This album includes Easton's final US top-20 hit to date, "What Comes Naturally", which remained on the pop chart for 10 weeks. The single reached number 4 in Australia, where the album also made the top 40. Other singles released were "You Can Swing It" and "To Anyone", both which failed to chart. The album charted in the United States at number 90. Easton is the co-writer on three tracks on the album.

The expanded edition of What Comes Naturally was released for streaming on Apple Music and Spotify on 16 August 2021.

== Background ==
Like her previous release, 1988's The Lover in Me, Easton's management sought to make the Scottish singer's image more accessible to a younger market. The cover art of What Comes Naturally, photographed by John Coulte, features the singer in a solid black leotard and thigh high boots straddling a chair. According to Coulte in a January 1991 interview with New York City-based Reader's Digest, "We were going for a sort of tramped up ballerina who moonlights as either a casino craps dealer or a New Jersey hairdresser with a gambling addiction. We struggled with props, ultimately going with a toddler's high chair over an infant's seesaw."

== Track listing ==
What Comes Naturally track listing
No.	Title	Writer(s)	Length
1.	"What Comes Naturally"	Antonina Armato, Gina Go-Go, Nick Mundy	4:32
2.	"If You Wanna Keep Me"	Vassal Benford, Ronald Spearman, Ellis Jay	4:34
3.	"You Can Swing It"	Brent "Epic" Mazur, Richard Wolf	4:08
4.	"The First Touch of Love"	Sheena Easton, Ian Prince	4:34
5.	"Forever Friends"	Oliver Leiber, Jeff Lorber	4:26
6.	"The Next Time"	Sheena Easton, David Frank	4:10
7.	"Manic Panic"	Ian Prince, Siedah Garrett	4:40
8.	"Somebody"	Ian Prince	4:38
9.	"Time Bomb"	David Frank, Martin Brammer	4:16
10.	"Half a Heart"	Sheena Easton, Oliver Leiber, Derek Bramble	4:05
11.	"To Anyone"	Dennis Matkosky, Matthew Wilder	4:57

== Personnel ==
- Sheena Easton – lead vocals, backing vocals (1–4, 7–10), additional backing vocals (5)
- Nick Mundy – synthesizer programming (1), backing vocals (1)
- Vassal Benford – all instruments (2), programming (2), vocal arrangements (2)
- Richard Wolf – keyboards (3), guitars (3), backing vocals (3), vocal arrangements (3)
- Ian Prince – keyboards (4, 7, 8), synthesizer programming (4, 7, 8), drum programming (4, 7, 8), percussion (4, 7, 8), backing vocals (4, 8)
- Steve Milo – additional synthesizer programming (4, 7, 8)
- Oliver Leiber – keyboard programming (5), guitars (5, 10), drum programming (5, 10), keyboards (10)
- Jeff Lorber – keyboard programming (5), guitars (5), drum programming (5), vocoder (10)
- David Frank – keyboards (6, 9)
- Paul "St. Paul" Peterson – additional keyboards (10), electric bass (10)
- Rich Tancredi – keyboards (11)
- Paul Pesco – guitars (6)
- Robert Palmer – guitars (7)
- Will Lee – electric bass (6)
- Bret Mazur – drums (3), programming (3), backing vocals (3)
- Jimmy Bralower – drums (6)
- Joey Franco – drums (11)
- Joey Diggs – backing vocals (1)
- Gina Go-Go – rap (1)
- Mildred Black – backing vocals (2)
- Antoinette Brown – backing vocals (2)
- Angela Dauphney – backing vocals (2)
- Valerie Davis – backing vocals (2)
- Ron Spearman – backing vocals (2), vocal arrangements (2)
- Charlene White – backing vocals (2)
- Delisa Davis – backing vocals (3)
- Colin England – backing vocals (3)
- Carmen Twillie – backing vocals (5)
- Maxine Waters – backing vocals (5, 11)
- Mona Lisa Young – backing vocals (5, 10)
- Terry Young – backing vocals (5)
- Debbe Cole – backing vocals (6)
- B.J. Nelson – backing vocals (6)
- Alex Brown – backing vocals (7)
- Phil Perry – backing vocals (7)
- Portia Griffin – backing vocals (10)
- Valerie Pinkston-Mayo – backing vocals (10)
- Julia Waters – backing vocals (11)
- Luther Waters – backing vocals (11)
- Oren Waters – backing vocals (11)

== Production ==
- Denny Diante – producer (1)
- Nick Mundy – producer (1), arrangements (1)
- Vassal Benford – producer (2), arrangements (2)
- Wolf & Epic – producers (3)
- Ian Prince – producer (4, 7, 8)
- Oliver Leiber – producer (5, 10), arrangements (5, 10)
- Jeff Lorber – producer (5), arrangements (5)
- David Frank – producer (6, 9), arrangements (6, 9)
- Ric Wake – producer (11), arrangements (11)
- Rich Tancredi – arrangements (11)
- Todd Alan – Science Lab studio coordinator (6)
- Laura Harding – production coordinator (7)
- David Barrett – production coordinator (11)
- John Coulter – art direction, design
- Margo Chase – logo design
- Randee St. Nicholas – cover photography, other photography
- Alberto Tolot – other photography
- Barron Matalon – hair
- Francesca Tolot – make-up
- Elizabeth Keiselbach – stylist
- Harriet Wasserman – management
- Jody Kennedy – management assistant

Technical

- Steve Harrison – recording (1, 10)
- Robert Rochelle – recording (1)
- Jon Gass – mixing (1, 10)
- Neal Pogue – recording (2)
- Peter Arata – mixing (2, 9), recording (9)
- Dave Pensado – recording (3)
- Frank Wolf – mixing (3)
- Ted Blaisdell – recording (4, 7, 8), mixing (4, 7, 8)
- Jeff Lorber – recording (5, 10)
- Gabriel Moffat – recording (5)
- Alan Meyerson – mixing (5)
- David Dachinger – recording (6)
- Doug DeAngelis – recording (6)
- Paul McKenna – recording (6)
- Michael O'Reilly – recording (6)
- Ray Bardani – mixing (6)
- Martin Brammer – mix advisor (9)
- Greg Grill – recording (10)
- Peter Martinsen – recording (10)
- Bob Cadway – recording (11)
- David Leonard – remixing (11)
- Marnie Riley – recording assistant (1)
- Shawn Berman – assistant engineer (2)
- Greg Barrett – recording assistant (3)
- Steve Egelman – recording assistant (3)
- Gil Morales – assistant mix engineer (3)
- Daryl Dobson – assistant engineer (4, 7, 8)
- Wolfgang Aichholz – recording assistant (5, 9)
- John Chamberlin – assistant mix engineer (5, 9)
- Donnell Sullivan – assistant mix engineer (10)
- Dan Hetzel – assistant engineer (11)
- Tom Yezzi – assistant engineer (11)

== Charts ==
Chart performance for What Comes Naturally
Chart (1991)	Peak position
Australian Albums (ARIA)	38
Dutch Albums (Album Top 100)	50
Japanese Albums (Oricon)	85
Swedish Albums (Sverigetopplistan)	41
US Billboard 200	90
