= Do You (album) =

Studio album by Sheena Easton
- Released: November 1985
- Studios: Skyline Studios (New York City, New York)
- Genres: Pop; dance
- Length: 47:21
- Label: EMI
- Producer: Nile Rodgers

Sheena Easton chronology
Todo Me Recuerda a Ti (1984)	Do You (1985)	No Sound But a Heart (1987)

Professional ratings
Review scores
Source	Rating
AllMusic	4/5 stars

Do You is the sixth English-language studio album by the Scottish singer Sheena Easton. It was originally released in November 1985 by EMI Records, and later reissued and remastered as a 2CD set by Cherry Red Records in 2024, with additional material, including the full-length unedited versions of the entire album. The album was produced by Nile Rodgers. Not as successful as her previous album, Do You peaked at number 40 in the US, but was certified gold and featured the top 30 hit "Do It for Love".

== Background ==
Having reached a peak of success with her previous album A Private Heaven, Easton's record company secured the services of top producer Nile Rodgers to work with her on the follow-up album. Rodgers himself was also riding a career high at the time as a producer having recently worked with Madonna on her top-selling album Like a Virgin.

Of the songs chosen, Rodgers composed two ("Magic of Love" and "Money Back Guarantee"), while hit singer/songwriters Adele Bertei and Junior Giscombe contributed "Do It For Love" and "Don't Turn Your Back" respectively. The latter was later featured in an episode of the Miami Vice television series in 1988. A cover of the Martha and the Vandellas 1967 hit "Jimmy Mack" was also included. The sound of the album was a departure from her pop sound and had a more dance/club feel. While a popular album with her fans, Easton was not happy with the results, later commenting: "Looking back, it was a huge mistake. I think as artists we just didn't gel and it's the album I'm most disappointed by."

== Release ==
Released in November 1985, the album was preceded by the single "Do It For Love", which made the US top 30, peaking at number 29 in December. The album entered the Billboard 200 on 23 November and a month later peaked at number 40 during a 19-week run. By the end of the year, it was certified Gold by the RIAA. Later singles released were: "Jimmy Mack" and "Magic of Love", the former peaking at number 65 in February 1986. In her native UK, however, the album was unsuccessful. Easton puts this down to the British view that she had abandoned her country for success in America. Neither the singles nor the album registered on the chart, with her only chart showing in 1985 being for the earlier single "Sugar Walls" at number 95. Do You did however chart at number 32 in Japan and number 66 in Canada.

== Reception and legacy ==
The album received a favorable retrospective review by Allmusic, stating that "Easton consistently delivers driven, top-of-the-line performances, resulting in her sounding much more comfortable with dance material than on previous efforts". It lists the best songs as being the non-singles "Don't Break My Heart", "When the Lightning Strikes Again" and "Money Back Guarantee".

Due to her next album No Sound But a Heart failing to achieve a release in the United States, Do You would be Easton's last widely available album in the U.S. until 1988's The Lover in Me.

On August 23, 2024, as part of Cherry Red’s on-going re-issue campaign of the star’s EMI catalogue, Do You was released as an expanded 2CD Deluxe Edition featuring single edits, 12" mixes, instrumentals and, most notably, the previously unreleased full uncut original album which was edited for the original release. These were also simultaneously released on orange vinyl as Do You: The Uncut Nile Rodgers Sessions.

== Track listing ==
Side one

1. "Do It for Love" (Adele Bertei, Mary Kessler) – 5:03
2. "Don't Break My Heart" (Danny Ironstone, Tony Maiden, Mary Unobsky) – 3:47
3. "Magic of Love" (Nile Rodgers) – 5:05
4. "Don't Turn Your Back" (Gordon Gaynor, Mel Gaynor, Junior Giscombe) – 5:29
5. "Jimmy Mack" (Lamont Dozier, Eddie Holland, Brian Holland) – 4:12

Side two

1. "Can't Wait Till Tomorrow" (John Keller, Geoffrey Leib, Rick Neigher) – 4:47
2. "Young Lions" (Dana Merino) – 4:54
3. "Kisses" (Larry Nacht) – 4:03
4. "Money Back Guarantee" (Martin Celay, Nile Rodgers) – 4:34
5. "When The Lightning Strikes Again" (Dan Hartman, Charlie Midnight) – 5:10

The 2025 2CD Deluxe Edition contains the following bonus tracks: CD1

1. "Do It For Love" (Single Version) – 3:51
2. "Can't Wait 'Till Tomorrow*" (Single Version) – 3:52
3. "Jimmy Mack" (Edited Version) – 4:06
4. "Money Back Guarantee" (Edited Version) – 4:06
5. "Magic Of Love" (Long Edited Version) – 4:50
6. "Don't Turn Your Back" (TV Mix) – 7:23
7. "Kisses" (TV Mix) – 4:05

CD2 - The Uncut Nile Rodgers Sessions

1. "Do It for Love" (Break Mix) – 4:51
2. "Don't Break My Heart" – 4:44
3. "Magic Of Love" – 5:59
4. "Don't Turn Your Back" – 7:23
5. "Jimmy Mack" – 5:29
6. "Can't Wait Till Tomorrow" – 5:22
7. "Young Lions" – 5:18
8. "Kisses" – 4:11
9. "Money Back Guarantee" – 5:26
10. "When The Lightning Strikes Again" – 6:10
11. "Do It For Love" (Dance Mix - Edited Version)– 5:20
12. "Jimmy Mack" (Extended Version) – 6:31
13. "Magic Of Love" (TV Mix) – 5:59
14. "When The Lightning Strikes Again" (TV Mix) – 6:08

track 6 previously released as "Can't Wait Till Tomorrow" (Dance Mix)

== Personnel ==
=== Musicians ===
- Sheena Easton – lead vocals, backing vocals
- Nile Rodgers – keyboards, guitars, bass, backing vocals
- James Farber – keyboards
- Rob Preuss – keyboards
- Peter Scherer – keyboards
- Kevin Jones – Synclavier programming
- Martin Celay – guitars
- Jimmy Bralower – drums
- Stan Harrison – alto saxophone
- Steve Elson – baritone saxophone
- Lenny Pickett – tenor saxophone
- Mac Gollehon – trumpet
- Matt "Briz" Brislawn – backing vocals
- Michelle Cobbs – backing vocals
- Diane Garisto – backing vocals
- Terri Gonzalez – backing vocals
- Brenda White King – backing vocals
- Curtis King – backing vocals
- Frank Simms – backing vocals
- George Simms – backing vocals
- David Spinner – backing vocals
- Fonzi Thornton – backing vocals
- Norma Jean Wright – backing vocals

=== Production ===
- Nile Rodgers – producer
- James Farber – recording, mixing
- Scott Ansell – second engineer
- Knut Bøhn – second engineer
- Bob Ludwig – mastering at Masterdisk (New York City, New York)
- Kevin Jones – production manager
- Budd Tunick – production manager
- Tommy Steele – design for Steele Works
- Henry Marquez – artwork coordinator
- Phillip Dixon – photography
- Alan Dockery – background photography
- Paul Maxon – background photography
- Elisabetta Rogiani – stylist
- Francesca Tolot – make-up
- Barron Matalon – hair
- Harriet Wasserman – management

== Charts ==
1985 chart performance for Do You
Chart (1985)	Peak position
Canada Top Albums/CDs (RPM)	66
Japanese Albums (Oricon)	32
US Billboard 200	40

2024 chart performance for Do You
Chart (2024)	Peak position
Scottish Albums (Official Charts)	46
UK Independent Albums (Official Charts)	29

== Certifications ==
Certifications for Do You
Region	Certification	Certified units/sales
United States (RIAA)	Gold	500,000^{^}
^{^} Shipments figures based on certification alone.
