= Freedom (Sheena Easton album) =

Studio album by Sheena Easton
- Released: 28 May 1997
- Studio: Westlake Audio and Record Plant (Los Angeles, California); Zebra Studio (Studio City, California); Blue Iron Gate Studios (Santa Monica, California); Camp Canoga (Canoga Park, California); Brandon's Way Recording (Hollywood, California)
- Genre: Pop
- Length: 44:19
- Label: MCA
- Producer: Denny Diante; Sheena Easton; Clif Magness; Humberto Gatica; Danny Jacob; Andy Goldmark; Randy Waldman

Sheena Easton chronology
My Cherie (1995)	Freedom (1997)	Home (1999)

Freedom is the thirteenth studio album by Sheena Easton released only in Japan, where it charted at number 53.

The album consists of smooth, catchy dance-pop songs including the singles "Modern Girl '97", "Love Me with Freedom", and "When You Speak My Name". Easton had co-writing credits on songs "One Man" and "Love Will Make You Wise" and producing credits on three tracks. The album also includes cover versions of the country/R&B classic "Misty Blue", best known by Dorothy Moore's 1973 soul version, and Steve Perry's 1985 rock hit "Foolish Heart".

Easton released Freedom on her own label (SkyJay Trax) on 28 May 1997, at the same time she officially opened her website. In February 20, 2007 Fuel Records (Varèse Sarabande) re-released Freedom with a slip cover and different artwork in the United States.

== Track listings ==
1. "When You Speak My Name" (Antonina Armato, Benny Cosgrove, Kevin Clark) – 4:26
2. "Love Me with Freedom" (Antonina Armato, Greg Gerard) – 4:25
3. "Now That My Baby's Gone" (Alex Alessandroni, Gloria Stewart, Lorenzo Pryor, Sue Ann Carwell) – 4:30
4. "One Man" (Carole Bayer Sager, Clif Magness, Sheena Easton) – 4:38
5. "Misty Blue" (Bob Montgomery) – 4:39
6. "One More Reason" (Antonina Armato, Tom Keene) – 4:25
7. "Let Me Go Through This Alone" (Andy Goldmark, Mark Mueller) – 4:04
8. "Love Will Make You Wise" (Clif Magness, Sheena Easton) – 4:11
9. "Foolish Heart" (Randy Goodrum, Steve Perry) – 4:54
10. "Modern Girl '97" (Dominic Bugatti, Frank Musker) – 4:13

== Personnel ==
- Sheena Easton – vocals, additional backing vocals (2, 3, 6, 7), backing vocals (4, 5, 9, 10), BGV arrangements (5, 9)
- Randy Waldman – programming and arrangements (1)
- Clif Magness – programming and arrangements (2–4, 8, 10)
- Claude Gaudette – programming and arrangements (6)
- Danny Jacob – guitars (1, 5), programming and arrangements (5, 9)
- Tim Pierce – guitars (6)
- Michael Thompson – guitars (6)
- Sue Ann Carwell – backing vocals (1–3, 6, 7), BGV arrangements (3, 6)
- Maxi Anderson – backing vocals (10)
- Lynn Davis – backing vocals (10)

=== Production ===
- Denny Diante – executive producer, A&R direction, producer (1–4, 6, 7, 10)
- Randy Waldman – producer (1), engineer (1)
- Clif Magness – producer (2–4, 8, 10)
- Sheena Easton – producer (5, 8, 9)
- Danny Jacob – producer (5, 9)
- Andy Goldmark – producer (7)
- Jess Sutcliffe – engineer (1–5, 7–9), mixing (1, 5, 7–9)
- Jim "Bonzai" Caruso – mixing (2)
- Jon Gass – mixing (3, 10)
- Humberto Gatica – mixing (4, 6), producer (6), engineer (6)
- Elliot Scheiner – engineer (10)
- Bernie Grundman – mastering at Bernie Grundman Mastering (Hollywood, California)
- Harriet Wasserman – production coordinator, management
- Joan Scheibel – package design
- Stephen Sigoloff – photography
- RiccI DeMartino – stylist
- Natalie Miller – hair, make-up

== Charts ==
Chart performance for Freedom
Chart (1997)	Peak position
Japanese Albums (Oricon)	53
