= No Strings (album) =

Studio album by Sheena Easton
- Released: 13 August 1993
- Recorded: 1993
- Studio: Group IV Recording (Los Angeles, California)
- Genre: Jazz; show tunes
- Length: 46:00
- Label: MCA
- Producer: Patrice Rushen

Sheena Easton chronology
What Comes Naturally (1991)	No Strings (1993)	My Cherie (1995)

Professional ratings
Review scores
Source	Rating
AllMusic	link
Entertainment Weekly	B
Orlando Sentinel	2/5 stars

No Strings is the eleventh studio album by Scottish singer Sheena Easton released in 1993 by MCA Records. The album was a departure from the pop and R&B style of her earlier recordings with jazz-tinged production arrangements by Patrice Rushen.

The album was recorded live in the studio, as Easton wanted to record the music in a similar fashion to Frank Sinatra's Capitol Records sessions of the 1960s. The song "The Nearness of You" was featured on the soundtrack to the film Indecent Proposal. Easton appears in a cameo role singing the song with Herbie Hancock playing the piano during a pivotal moment in the film, and the song was released as a promo single in some European markets.

== Track listing ==
1. "Someone to Watch Over Me" (George Gershwin, Ira Gershwin) – 3:18
2. "Medley: I'm in the Mood for Love / Moody's Mood for Love" (Jimmy McHugh, Dorothy Fields / Dorothy Fields, Jimmy McHugh, James Moody) – 4:14
3. "The Nearness of You" (Hoagy Carmichael, Ned Washington) – 3:17
4. "How Deep Is the Ocean" (Irving Berlin) – 3:40
5. "If You Go Away" (Ne me quitte pas) (Jacques Brel, Rod McKuen) – 5:52
6. "Body and Soul" (Edward Heyman, Frank Eyton, Johnny Green, Robert Sour) – 5:51
7. "Medley: Little Girl Blue / When Sunny Gets Blue" (Lorenz Hart, Richard Rodgers / Marvin Fisher, Jack Segal) – 6:10
8. "The One I Love Belongs to Somebody Else" (Gus Kahn, Isham Jones) – 3:25
9. "The Man That Got Away" (Harold Arlen, Ira Gershwin) – 4:23
10. "I Will Say Goodbye" (Alan Bergman, Marilyn Bergman, Michel Legrand) – 2:37
11. "Never Will I Marry" (Frank Loesser) – 3:25

== Personnel ==
=== Musicians ===
- Sheena Easton – vocals
- Patrice Rushen – acoustic piano
- Phil Upchurch – guitars (2, 6, 8)
- Paul Jackson, Jr. – guitars (5, 10)
- Reggie Hamilton – bass (1)
- Ken Wild – bass (2–11)
- John Guerin – drums (1)
- Leon "Ndugu" Chancler – drums (2–11)
- Valerie King – flute (2, 5, 6, 8, 10)
- Fred Jackson, Jr. – alto saxophone (2, 5, 8, 10), soprano saxophone (2, 5, 8, 10), tenor saxophone (6)
- Bob Sheppard – alto saxophone (4, 7), tenor saxophone (4, 7), tenor sax solo (11)
- Larry Williams – tenor saxophone (6, 8), clarinet (6, 8)
- Lew McCreary – trombone (2, 6, 8), bass trombone (5, 10)
- Reggie Young – trombone (2, 6, 8)
- Rick Baptist – trumpet (2, 6, 8), flugelhorn (2, 6, 8)
- Raymond Lee Brown – trumpet (2, 4, 6, 7, 8), flugelhorn (2, 5, 6, 8), cornet (4, 7)
- Marni Johnson – French Horn (2, 5, 6, 8, 10)
- Richard Todd – French Horn (2, 6, 8)

=== Production ===
- Patrice Rushen – producer, arrangements
- Rick Winquest – recording, mixing
- Eric Cowden – assistant engineer
- Dann Thompson – assistant engineer
- Bernie Grundman – mastering at Bernie Grundman Mastering (Hollywood, California)
- Booker White – music copyist
- Vartan – art direction
- John Coulter – design
- Margo Chase – logo design
- Alberto Tolot – photography
- Barron Matalon – hair
- Fleur Theimeyer – stylist
- Francesca Tolot – make-up
- Harriet Wasserman – management

== Charts ==
Chart performance for No Strings
Chart (1993)	Peak position
Japanese Albums (Oricon)	80
