= Take My Time =

Studio album by Sheena Easton
- Released: 19 January 1981
- Recorded: 1979–1980
- Studio: AIR Studios (Montserrat)
- Genre: Pop
- Length: 40.23 (UK); 32.40 (US)
- Label: EMI
- Producer: Christopher Neil

Sheena Easton chronology
Take My Time (1981)	You Could Have Been with Me (1981)

Singles from Take My Time
- 1. "Modern Girl" Released: 29 February 1980; 2. "9 to 5" Released: 16 May 1980; 3. "One Man Woman" Released: October 1980; 4. "Take My Time" Released: February 1981; 5. "When He Shines" Released: April 1981

Professional ratings
Review scores
Source	Rating
AllMusic	4/5 stars
Record Mirror	3/5 stars

Take My Time is the debut album by UK pop singer Sheena Easton. Released in January 1981, the album reached number 17 in the UK and earned her a Gold Disc. Two months later, a ten track version of the album was released in the US and Canada as Sheena Easton. The album went gold in the US and platinum in Canada.

== Recording ==
After becoming suddenly famous due to her appearance on a television documentary in 1980 and with the hits "9 To 5" (which went gold) and "Modern Girl", Easton began recording her debut album with producer Christopher Neil. Easton later said that working with Neil was a great idea, remarking "They didn't just go: 'Right, just go sing Over the Rainbow or some cover', they brought in this top producer for me to work with". She says that although she didn't write the material on the album, Neil had a good ear for hit records and would send her tapes of songs from which she would decide which ones to record, "so I had a part in picking the hits, but I'm also guilty of picking the ones that were rubbish!" The style of the album was a combination of pure pop (e.g. "Take My Time" and "Voice on the Radio") and dramatic ballads ("When He Shines" and "Calm Before the Storm").

Of the other tracks recorded, Easton had already performed "When He Shines" at the Royal Variety Performance in November 1980, while "Prisoner" was a cover of a Sue Saad and the Next song released earlier in 1980. The album's opening track, "Don't Send Flowers" had recently been released as a single by British band Sailor, but had been unsuccessful.

== Release ==
The album charted in February 1981, just as Easton was finding fame in the US when "9 to 5" (retitled "Morning Train (Nine to Five)" to avoid confusion with a record by Dolly Parton called "9 To 5") took her to No. 1 in the charts there. In the UK, the album met with favourable response by reaching No. 17 and spent 19 weeks on the charts. In the US, it was released two months later and also made the top 30. By May 1981, three more singles were released from the collection, namely "One Man Woman", "Take My Time" and "When He Shines". With four of the singles reaching the top 20 in the UK (the title track reached a lower number 44), Easton became the first female artist to score five top 50 singles hits from an album.

In the US, the album was simply titled Sheena Easton and included only two singles ("Morning Train" and "Modern Girl") before Easton was to chart highly with a new song, the James Bond theme "For Your Eyes Only". "When He Shines" was not included on her debut, but went on to be included on her second US album, You Could Have Been With Me (it was also released as a single and reached number 30 on the US Hot 100 in June 1982). Easton quickly became a staple on Adult Contemporary radio, where "Morning Train" also hit No. 1 and "Modern Girl" reached the top 10, both in 1981. Producer Christopher Neil continued to work with Easton and produced her following two albums in a similar vein, before Easton decided to leave behind the pure-pop image she had gained.

Take My Time was re-released on Compact disc in the US on 19 June 1999 with bonus tracks by One Way Records. The UK version of the album was re-released on CD on 19 October 2009 with bonus tracks by Cherry Red Records. On 24 November 2014 the album was included in an Original Album Series box set in the UK with all of her first five albums with EMI through Warner Music Group. A 2 CD/DVD deluxe edition of "Take My Time" remastered from the original master tapes for the first time with seven bonus tracks, including three previously unreleased track and "Have You Heard the Rumour", along with four B-sides, and five EMI promotional videos was released on 17 February 2023 by Cherry Pop and RT Industries.

== Track listing ==
=== International version ===
Side one

1. "Don't Send Flowers" (Phil Pickett) – 3:02
2. "Cry" (Frank Musker, Garth Murphy) – 3:32
3. "Take My Time" (Paul Bliss, Phil Palmer) – 2:39
4. "When He Shines" (Dominic Bugatti, Florrie Palmer) – 3:56
5. "One Man Woman" (Mick Leeson, Peter Vale) – 3:06
6. "Prisoner" (D.B. Cooper, James Lance, Tony Riparetti) – 3:34

Side two

1. "9 to 5" (Florrie Palmer) – 3:20
2. "So Much In Love" (Dominic Bugatti, Frank Musker) – 3:04
3. "Voice On the Radio" (Florrie Palmer, Peter Vale) – 3:18
4. "Calm Before the Storm" (Christopher Neil, Peter Vale) – 3:28
5. "Modern Girl" (Dominic Bugatti, Frank Musker) – 3:37
6. "No One Ever Knows" (Mick Leeson, Peter Vale) – 3:47

"The B-Sides"

1. "Paradox" (Christopher Neil) – 2:40
2. "Moody (My Love)" (Easton, Christopher Neil) – 2:07
3. "Summer's Over" (Florrie Palmer, Christopher Neil) – 3:24
4. "Right or Wrong" (Florrie Palmer) – 3:17

"The Studio Sessions"

1. "Have You Heard the Rumour"
2. "Modern Girl" (instrumental)
3. "Morning Train (9 to 5)" (instrumental)

=== North American version ===
Side one

1. "Morning Train (9 to 5)"
2. "Don't Send Flowers"
3. "Cry"
4. "Take My Time"
5. "Prisoner"

Side two

1. "Modern Girl"
2. "So Much in Love"
3. "Voice On the Radio"
4. "One Man Woman"
5. "Calm Before the Storm"

Bonus tracks later released on CD

1. "Family of One" (Mick Leeson, Peter Vale) – 4:15
2. "Please Don't Sympathise" (Steve Thompson) – 3:28
3. "Right or Wrong" (Phil Palmer) – 3:15
4. "Paradox" (Christopher Neil) – 2:39
5. "Summer's Over" (Christopher Neil, Phil Palmer) – 3:26

== Personnel ==
=== Musicians ===
- Sheena Easton – vocals
- Derek Austin – keyboards
- David Cullen – keyboards, string arrangements
- Billy Lyall – keyboards
- Ian Lynn – keyboards
- Peter Vale – keyboards, backing vocals
- Rusty Powell - guitars
- Phil Palmer – guitars
- Andy Brown – bass
- Peter Van Hooke – drums
- Frank Ricotti – percussion
- Tony Hall – saxophone
- Sharon Campbell – backing vocals
- Alan Carvell – backing vocals
- Kim Goody – backing vocals
- Frank Musker – backing vocals
- Christopher Neil – backing vocals

=== Production ===
- Christopher Neil – producer
- Nick Ryan – engineer
- Tony George – assistant engineer
- Simon Hurrell – assistant engineer
- Brett Kennedy – assistant engineer
- Audio International Studios (London, England) – remixing location
- Peter Shepherd – design
- Brian Aris – photography
- D & J Arlon Enterprises Ltd. – management

== Chart performance ==
=== Album ===
Chart performance for Take My Time / Sheena Easton
Chart (1981)	Peak position
Australian Albums (Kent Music Report)	57
Canada Top Albums/CDs (RPM)	12
Norwegian Albums (VG-lista)	33
Swedish Albums (Sverigetopplistan)	22
UK Albums (Official Charts)	17
US Billboard 200	24

=== Singles ===
Chart performance for singles from Take My Time
Original release date	Single title	UK	US	JPN	AUS	IRL
February 1980	"Modern Girl"	8	18	18	24	10
May 1980	"9 to 5" / "Morning Train (9 to 5)"	3	1	17	1	2
October 1980	"One Man Woman"	14	—	—	—	5
February 1981	"Take My Time"	44	—	—	—	—
April 1981	"When He Shines"	12	30	—	—	9

== Certifications ==
Certifications for Take My Time
Country	Certification	Sales
United Kingdom (BPI)	Gold	100,000
United States (RIAA)	Gold	500,000
