= My Cherie =

Studio album by Sheena Easton
- Released: 1995
- Studios: Record Plant and Westlake Studios (Los Angeles, California); Zebra Studio (Studio City, California); Capitol Studios, A&M Studios and Brooklyn Studios (Hollywood, California); Frantic Studios and Larrabee Sound Studios (North Hollywood, California); Tarpan Studios (San Rafael, California); Chartmaker Studios (Malibu, California); Cove City Sound Studios (Glen Cove, New York); The Dream Factory (New York City, New York); The Mill (Cookham, UK)
- Genres: Pop; adult contemporary
- Length: 42:51
- Label: MCA
- Producers: Christopher Neil; Ric Wake; Narada Michael Walden; Denny Diante; David Foster; Glen Ballard; Humberto Gatica

Sheena Easton chronology
No Strings (1993)	My Cherie (1995)	Freedom (1997)

Professional ratings
Review scores
Source	Rating
AllMusic	link
Knoxville News Sentinel	2/5 stars

My Cherie is the twelfth album by Scottish singer Sheena Easton, released in 1995 on MCA Records. The album consists of adult pop songs. The title track was issued as a single but failed to chart. Other tracks include "You've Learned to Live Without Me" by Diane Warren, "Please Don't Be Scared" (previously recorded by Barry Manilow), and "Crazy Love" (previously recorded by Amy Keys and subsequently covered by Luther Vandross).

== Background ==
The album marked Easton's reunion with producer Christopher Neil, who worked on her first three albums. The songs "Flower in the Rain" and "Dance Away the Blues" were both used in a TV episode of "The Outer Limits" entitled "Falling Star", featuring Easton as a faded rock star. "Flower in the Rain" was co-written by Easton and released as a single in France.

== Critical reception ==
Billboard's review in their issue dated 25 February 1995 stated, "Easton previews her forthcoming album with a swinging ballad that sways with lush, retro-R&B rhythms. Easton sounds as good as ever. Producer Denny Diante surrounds her with brassy horns and swirling background vocals. In all, a solid contender for Top 40, AC and urban level play."

== Track listing ==
1. "My Cherie" (Antonina Armato, Wendell Wellman) – 4:20
2. "Till Death Do Us Part" (Antonina Armato, Jorge Corante, Mugg James) – 4:52
3. "All I Ask of You" (Chris Eaton, Pam Sheyne) – 5:05
4. "Flower in the Rain" (Sheena Easton, Arnie Roman, Tina Shafer) – 3:32
5. "You've Learned to Live without Me" (Diane Warren) – 4:26
6. "Too Much in Love" (Glen Ballard, Clif Magness) – 4:04
7. "Please Don't Be Scared" (Mindy Sterling) – 4:21
8. "Next to You" (George Merrill, Danny O'Keefe) – 3:33
9. "Dance Away the Blues" (Chris Eaton) – 4:03
10. "Crazy Love" (David Lasley, Robin Lerner, Marsha Malamet, Allan Rich) – 4:34

JAPANESE BONUS TRACK

1. "The Miracle Of Love" (Sheena Easton, Chika Ueda) – 4:22

== Personnel ==
=== Musicians ===
- Sheena Easton – lead vocals, backing vocals (1, 3, 5, 6, 8, 9)
- Randy Waldman – keyboards (1, 7, 8), programming (1, 7), arrangements (1, 7)
- Louis Biancaniello – keyboards (2), programming (2)
- Steve Piggot – programming (3, 9), keyboards (9), drums (9)
- Peter Zizzo – keyboards (4), guitars (4), drums (4), arrangements (4)
- David Foster – acoustic piano (5, 10), arrangements (5, 10)
- Claude Gaudette – synthesizers (5, 10)
- Glen Ballard – keyboards (6), organ (6), programming (6)
- Clif Magness – keyboards (6)
- David Frank – programming (8)
- Bruce Gaitsch – guitars (1)
- Stef Burns – guitars (2)
- Danny Jacob – guitars (3, 9)
- Michael Thompson – guitars (5)
- Michael Landau – guitars (6)
- John D Morton – guitars (8)
- Phil Palmer – guitars (9)
- Neil Stubenhaus – bass (5)
- Narada Michael Walden – drums (2), arrangements (2)
- Mike Baird – drums (5)
- David Boruff – saxophones (1)
- Paul Hanson – saxophones (1)
- Chuck Findley – trumpet (1)
- Anne King – trumpet (1)
- Jeremy Lubbock – arrangements (5, 10), string arrangements (5, 10)
- Jules Chakin – orchestra contractor (5, 10)
- Assa Drori – concertmaster (5, 10)
- Charles Flemming – backing vocals (1)
- Nikita Germaine – backing vocals (2)
- Tina Hicks – backing vocals (2)
- Natalie Jackson – backing vocals (2)
- Claytoven Richardson – backing vocals (2)
- Beth Anderson – backing vocals (8)
- George Merrill – backing vocals (8)
- Shannon Rubicam – backing vocals (8)
- Chris Eaton – backing vocals (9)

=== Production ===
- Don Grierson – A&R
- Denny Diante – executive producer, producer (1, 7), additional production (8)
- Narada Michael Walden – producer (2)
- Christopher Neil – producer (3, 8, 9)
- Ric Wake – producer (4)
- David Foster – producer (5, 10)
- Humberto Gatica – additional production (5, 10)
- Glen Ballard – producer (6)
- David Frank – producer (11: Japan bonus track)
- Shawne Groves – project coordinator
- Janice Lee – production coordinator (2)
- Cynthia Shiloh – production coordinator (2)
- Kevin Walden – production coordinator (2)
- Jolie Levine – production coordinator (6)
- John Coulter – design
- Margo Chase – logo design, song title calligraphy
- Albert Sanchez – portrait photography
- Photonica – still photography
- Barron Matalon – hair
- Francesca Tolot – make-up
- Vivian Turner – stylist
- Harriet Wasserman – management

Technical

- Wally Traugott – mastering at Capitol Studios (Hollywood, California)
- Humberto Gatica – mixing (1, 3–5, 7, 8, 10), engineer (5, 10)
- David Frazer – recording (2), mixing (2)
- Bob Cadway – recording (4)
- Terence Dover – recording (4)
- Dave Scheuer – recording (4)
- Shawn Murphy – engineer (5, 10)
- David Reitzas – engineer (5)
- Chris Fogal – recording (6)
- Francis Buckley – mixing (6)
- Rick Winquest – vocal engineer (7)
- Keith Cohen – mixing (9)
- Michael Reiter – assistant engineer (1)
- Marc Reyburn – assistant engineer (2)
- Ronnie Rivera – assistant engineer (3, 4, 7, 8)
- Doug McGuirk – assistant engineer (4)
- David Shackney – assistant engineer (4)
- Felipe Elgueta – assistant engineer (5), engineer (10)
- Bill Leonard – mix assistant (5, 10)
- Bryan Carrigan – assistant engineer (6)
- James Tunnicliffe – assistant engineer (6)

== Charts ==
Chart performance for My Cherie
Chart (1995)	Peak position
Japanese Albums (Oricon)	30
