= Home (Sheena Easton album) =

Studio album by Sheena Easton
- Released: 20 March 1999
- Studio: Westlake Audio and The Village Recorder (Los Angeles, California); Cornerstone Studios (Chatsworth, California); Media Ventures (Santa Monica, California); O'Henry Sound Studios (Burbank, California); On Air Azabu Studios and Arc Garret Studio (Japan)
- Genre: Pop
- Length: 41:45
- Label: Universal Victor
- Producer: Sheena Easton; Danny Jacob; Kenichi Shono; Tarō Iwashiro

Sheena Easton chronology
Freedom (1997)	Home (1999)	Fabulous (2000)

Home is the fourteenth studio album by Scottish singer Sheena Easton, and was released on March 20, 1999, by Universal Victor for the Japanese market only, where it charted at number 97. The disc consists of six tracks of new material and four cover versions from Crosby, Stills, Nash & Young, Paul Simon, Curtis Stigers and Stephen Sondheim. Easton self produced and arranged on nine of the album's tracks.

"Carry a Dream" was the first single release, and was used as the theme song for Japanese animated movie Marco. "My Treasure Is You" was issued as the follow-up in the latter part of 1999.

== Track listings ==
1. "Our House" (Graham Nash) – 3:12
2. "St. Judy's Comet" (Paul Simon) – 3:35
3. "Moon" (Jana Anderson) – 4:07
4. "Something Good" (Danny Jacob, Janis Liebhart) – 3:29
5. "Never Saw a Miracle" (Barry Mann, Curtis Stigers) – 5:23
6. "Not While I'm Around" (Stephen Sondheim) – 3:08
7. "Who Knows?" (Sally Dworsky, Scott Axiana Wilk) – 4:25
8. "Take Me Home" (John Capek, Marc Jordan, Steve Kipner) – 4:32
9. "My Treasure Is You" (Tommy Snyder, Kenichi Shono) – 5:20
10. "Carry a Dream" (Linda Hennrick, Taro Iwashiro) – 4:34

== Personnel ==
- Sheena Easton – vocals, backing vocals (1, 2, 4, 7, 9)
- Danny Jacob – programming (1, 4, 6), guitars (1, 3, 4, 6–8, 10), mandolin (7)
- Mark Levang – keyboards (3, 8), acoustic piano (3), additional keyboards (4, 5), organ (5)
- John Giluten – acoustic piano (5, 7)
- Kenichi Shono – all music (9)
- Makoto Matsushita – guitars (10)
- Matt Bissonette – bass (3)
- Leland Sklar – bass (5, 7, 8)
- Gregg Bissonette – drums (5, 7, 8)
- Suzie Katayama Strings – strings (10)
- Alex Brown – backing vocals (5, 8)
- Carmen Carter – backing vocals (5, 8)
- Dorian Holley – backing vocals (5, 8)
- Gary Stockdale – backing vocals (5, 8), BGV arrangements (5)
- Bill Cantos – backing vocals (10)
- Alfie Silas – backing vocals (10)
- Yvonne Williams – backing vocals (10)

=== Production ===
- Danny Jacob – producer (1–8), arrangements (1–8)
- Sheena Easton – producer (1–9), arrangements (2–9)
- Graham Nash – arrangements (1)
- Kenichi Shono – producer (9), arrangements (9)
- Taro Iwashiro – producer (10), arrangements (10)
- Harriet Wasserman – production coordinator, management
- Takayuki "Rastaman" Minegishi – artwork
- Randee St. Nicholas – photography
- Terri Apanasewicz – hair, make-up
- Gitte Meldgaard – stylist

Technical

- Jess Sutcliffe – engineer (1, 4–8), mixing (1, 2, 4–8)
- Greg Townley – engineer (2), mixing (9)
- Haruhiko Shimokawa – engineer (9)
- Al Schmitt – engineer (10)
- Masashi Goto – engineer (10)
- Monique Mizrahi – second engineer (1, 3, 4, 8), second mix engineer (2)
- Slamm Andrews – additional engineer (2, 4), engineer (3, 5, 7–9), second engineer (7)
- Kevin Globerman – additional engineer (4)

== Charts ==
Chart performance for Home
Chart (1999)	Peak position
Japanese Albums (Oricon)	97
