= Me Gustas Tal Como Eres =

Single by Sheena Easton and Luis Miguel

from the album Todo Me Recuerda a Ti and Palabra de Honor
- Released: 1984
- Genre: Latin pop
- Length: 3:14
- Label: EMI; RT Industries (current)
- Songwriters: Juan Carlos Calderón; Luis Gómez-Escolar
- Producer: Juan Carlos Calderón

Sheena Easton singles chronology
"Devil in a Fast Car" (1984)	"Me Gustas Tal Como Eres" (1984)	"La Noche y Tú" (1984)

Luis Miguel singles chronology
"Tu No Tienes Corazón" (1984)	"Me Gustas Tal Como Eres" (1984)	"Todo el Amor del Mundo" (1985)

"Me Gustas Tal Como Eres" (transl. 'I like you just the way you are') is a song written by Juan Carlos Calderón and Luis Gómez-Escolar, produced by Calderón, and performed by Scottish singer Sheena Easton in a duet with Mexican singer Luis Miguel. It was released by EMI Latin as the lead single from her first Spanish-language album, Todo Me Recuerda a Ti (1984). The song was later included on Luis Miguel's studio album Palabra de Honor (1984).

The song earned Best Mexican-American Performance at the 27th Grammy Awards, becoming Easton's second Grammy win and Luis Miguel's first, making him the youngest Grammy winner at the time (at age 14). The award sparked controversy among Mexican-American musicians and led to a protest.

== Charts ==
=== Weekly charts ===
Weekly chart performance for "Me Gustas Tal Como Eres"
Chart (1984)	Peak position
Chile (UPI)	3
Ecuador (UPI)	5
Mexico (AMPROFON)	2

== Certifications ==
Region	Certification	Certified units/sales
Mexico (AMPROFON)	Gold	30,000^{*}
^{*} Sales figures based on certification alone.
