= Sheena Easton =

Scottish singer (born 1959)

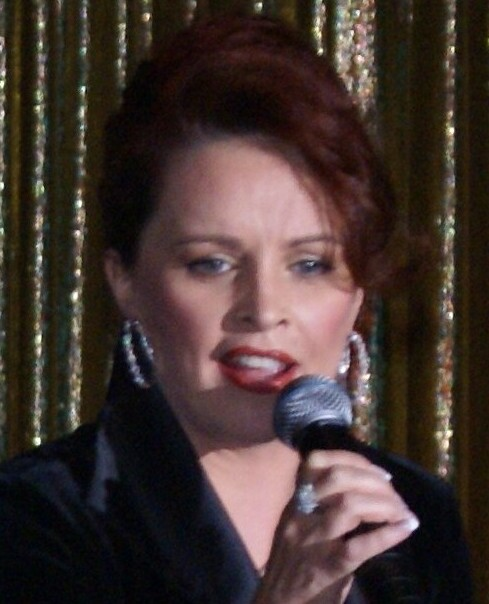
- Easton in 2009
- Born: Sheena Shirley Orr; 27 April 1959 (age 67); Bellshill, Lanarkshire, Scotland
- Occupations: Singer; actress; songwriter
- Spouse(s): Sandi Easton (m. 1979–1979); Rob Light (m. 1985–1986); Tim Delarm (1997–1998); John Minoli (2002–2003)
- Children: 2
- Musical career
- Genres: Pop; dance; R&B; Adult contemporary music
- Instrument: Vocals
- Works: Sheena Easton discography
- Years active: 1978–present
- Labels: EMI; MCA; Universal; RT Industries
- Website: sheenaeaston.com

Sheena Shirley Easton (née Orr; born 27 April 1959) is a Scottish singer, songwriter and actress who rose to prominence in the reality television series The Big Time: Pop Singer (1980). Her record sales worldwide are estimated at 20 million copies, and she became the first and only artist in Billboard history to have a top-five hit on each of the Billboard primary singles charts. Her commercial prominence in the 1980s led to collaborations with Prince, Kenny Rogers, Babyface, L.A. Reid and Nile Rodgers.

Born and raised in Bellshill, Lanarkshire, Easton signed a record deal with EMI Records, and her debut single, "Modern Girl", was released in February 1980. It reached number 8 in the United Kingdom and number 18 on the Billboard Hot 100 in the United States. Her follow–up single, "9 to 5", was equally successful, peaking at number 3 in the United Kingdom whilst in the United States it reached number 1 on the Billboard Hot 100 and the Billboard Adult Contemporary charts . It achieved commercial success in a number of international territories, and was certified Gold in Canada, United Kingdom and the United States. Her debut album, Take My Time (1981), performed well commercially, and by mid–1981, she had recorded and released "For Your Eyes Only" as the theme song for the James Bond movie of the same name.

She received the Grammy Award for Best New Artist at the 24th Annual Grammy Awards in February 1982, before her sales experienced a slight decline until her fifth album, A Private Heaven (1984). It marked a significant change in Easton's image towards a "sexy pop singer". The new look secured a return to prominence for Easton, with the albums lead single "Strut" reaching the top 10 in Argentina, Canada, New Zealand and the United States. She released "Sugar Walls", written by Prince under his pseudonym Alexander Nevermind, which was deemed controversial and met with reluctance due to its sexually explicit nature. Easton collaborated with country singer Kenny Rogers in 1982 on the release "We've Got Tonight". Throughout the mid-1980s, Easton's career had steadily declined in the United Kingdom, whilst her commercial dominance in the United States was more apparent.

Easton won the Grammy Award for Best Mexican-American Performance at the 27th Annual Grammy Awards for her collaboration with Luis Miguel on the single "Me Gustas Tal Como Eres". Her ninth album, The Lover in Me, was released in 1988 and became her first album to chart in on the UK Albums Charts in five years. The title track reached number 2 on the Billboard Hot 100, and reached number 1 on the Billboard Dance Singles Sales. The New York Times has described Easton as an "80s pop phenomenon", whilst also being regarded across the industry as one of the most defining and recognisable voices of the 1980s. As her career developed, Easton moved to the United States, and in time lost her Scottish accent. She infamously received heckles at the Big Day Out concert in Glasgow in 1990, following an unannounced schedule change.

== Life and career ==
=== 1959–1980: Early life and career beginnings ===
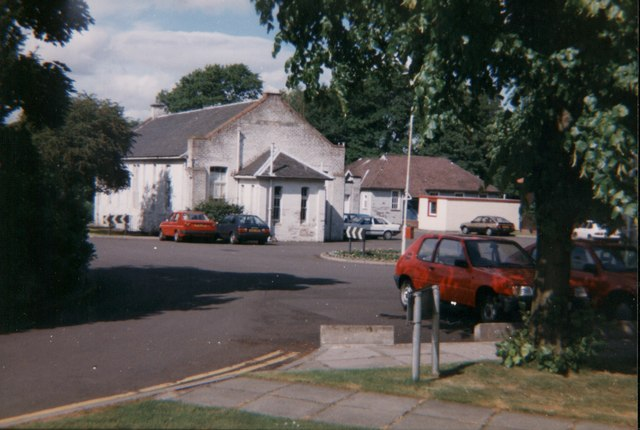
Easton was born at Bellshill Maternity Hospital in 1959

Sheena Shirley Orr was born on 27 April 1959, at Bellshill Maternity Hospital in Lanarkshire, Scotland, the youngest of six children of Annie and steel mill labourer Alex Orr. She has two brothers, Robert and Alex, and three sisters: Marilyn, Anessa, and Morag. Her earliest-known public performance as a singer was in 1964 when she was 5 and sang "Early One Morning" for her uncle and aunt and various relatives at the couple's 25th wedding anniversary celebration.

Easton's father died in 1969 and her mother had to support the family. According to Easton's website, despite her mother's heavy workload she was always available for her children: "Sheena always speaks very highly of her mum and the wonderful job she did in bringing up her and her siblings, including teaching them all to read at home before they were even enrolled in school." Easton did not consider a singing career until she saw the movie The Way We Were, with Barbra Streisand. Streisand's singing over the opening credits "overtook" the young girl and convinced her that what she wanted most was to be a singer and to have the same effect on others. Her top grades in school earned her a scholarship to attend the Royal Scottish Academy of Music and Drama in Glasgow, where she trained from 1975 to 1979 as a speech and drama teacher by day, while singing with a band called "Something Else" by night at local clubs. She chose to study teaching rather than performing, because it was a course of study that would let her perfect her craft as a singer.

In 1979, she married Sandi Easton, the first of her four husbands. They divorced after eight months, but Sheena decided to keep the surname Easton. That year, one of her tutors coaxed her into auditioning for Esther Rantzen, producer of the BBC programme The Big Time. Rantzen was planning a documentary film to chronicle a relative unknown's rise to pop-music stardom. Easton was selected as the subject for the programme; EMI executives awarded her a contract, and Christopher Neil was assigned as her recording producer. Deke Arlon became her first manager, and Easton spent much of 1980 being followed by camera crews, who filmed her throughout the process of her audition through to making her first EMI single, "Modern Girl". In the course of the filming, she met and sang for Dorothy Squires, Dusty Springfield and Lulu, whose manager Marion Massey told her that she saw Easton as a potential movie or TV star with her own series, but not as a pop singer for the 1980s as she lacked "rugged individuality".

The encounter with Massey (then Marion London), at which Lulu was present, was filmed and included in the broadcast, at which time Massey was not entirely incorrect, as "Modern Girl" flopped on its release, peaking at number 56 in just three weeks on the UK Singles Chart in April 1980. However, the conversation centred around image, with Lulu politely interjecting to say, "She's such a good-looking girl. You could actually do a lot with her." Once the programme aired in August 1980, "Modern Girl" was reissued and the track and its follow up "Nine to Five" both leapt into the top 10, seemingly disproving Massey's prediction, although Easton's look was noticeably different after the filmed conversation. A revised and extended version of this episode of The Big Time, broadcast in 1981, concluded with news of Easton's breaking into the American market.

=== 1981–1982: Take My Time and James Bond ===
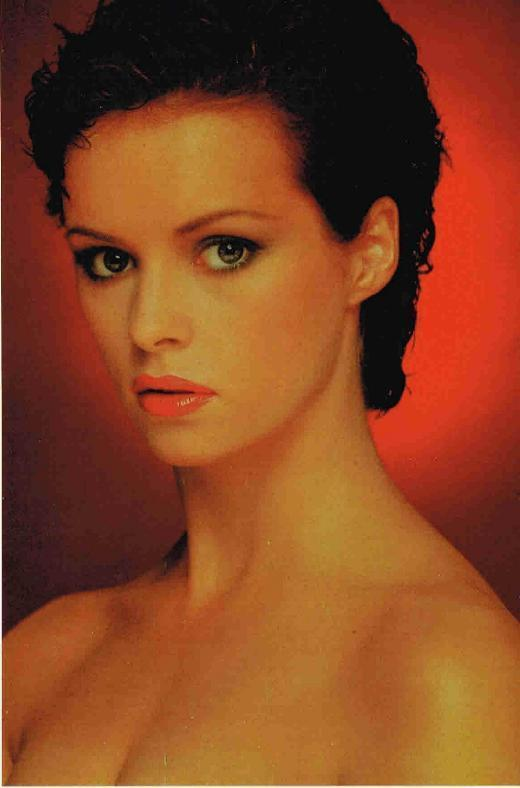
Easton in 1981

Easton's first single, the disco-tinged soft-synth-pop tune, "Modern Girl", was released in the UK before The Big Time aired, reaching number 56. At the end of the show, Easton was still unsure of her future as a singer. The question was resolved soon after the show aired, when her second single, "9 to 5", reached number 3 on the UK Singles Chart and was certified a Gold single in 1980.

"9 to 5" was Easton's first single release in the United States, although it was renamed "Morning Train (Nine To Five)" for its release in the US and Canada to avoid confusion with Dolly Parton's hit movie title song "9 to 5". "Morning Train (Nine to Five)" became Easton's first and only number 1 hit in the US and topped both the Billboard Hot 100 and Adult Contemporary charts in Billboard magazine. "Modern Girl" was released as the follow-up and peaked at number 18, and before 1981 was over she had a Top 10 hit in both the US and UK with the Academy Award-nominated James Bond movie theme "For Your Eyes Only". The song was nominated for the Academy Award for Best Original Song and the Golden Globe Award for Best Original Song in 1982. Easton's US success resulted in her winning the Grammy Award for "Best New Artist" for 1982. Easton actually appears in the opening credits of For Your Eyes Only, performing the song; as of 2026, she remains the only Bond theme singer to be featured in this way.

Easton's first three US albums, Sheena Easton (1981) (retitled edition of Take My Time), You Could Have Been with Me (1981), and Madness, Money & Music (1982), were all in the same soft rock/pop vein. The title track from You Could Have Been with Me made it in to the US top 15; however, by the end of 1982, she saw her sales slumping. Easton was one of the first artists to record "Wind Beneath My Wings" (included on Madness, Money & Music), which later was a hit for Bette Midler. In 1982, Easton undertook her first US tour. Her performance in Los Angeles was videotaped and broadcast on HBO and later released on VHS and Laserdisc as Sheena Easton Live at the Palace, Hollywood. On 8 November 1982, she appeared in the Royal Variety Performance in front of the Queen Mother singing "Maybe This Time".

=== 1983–1987: Best Kept Secret and works with Prince ===
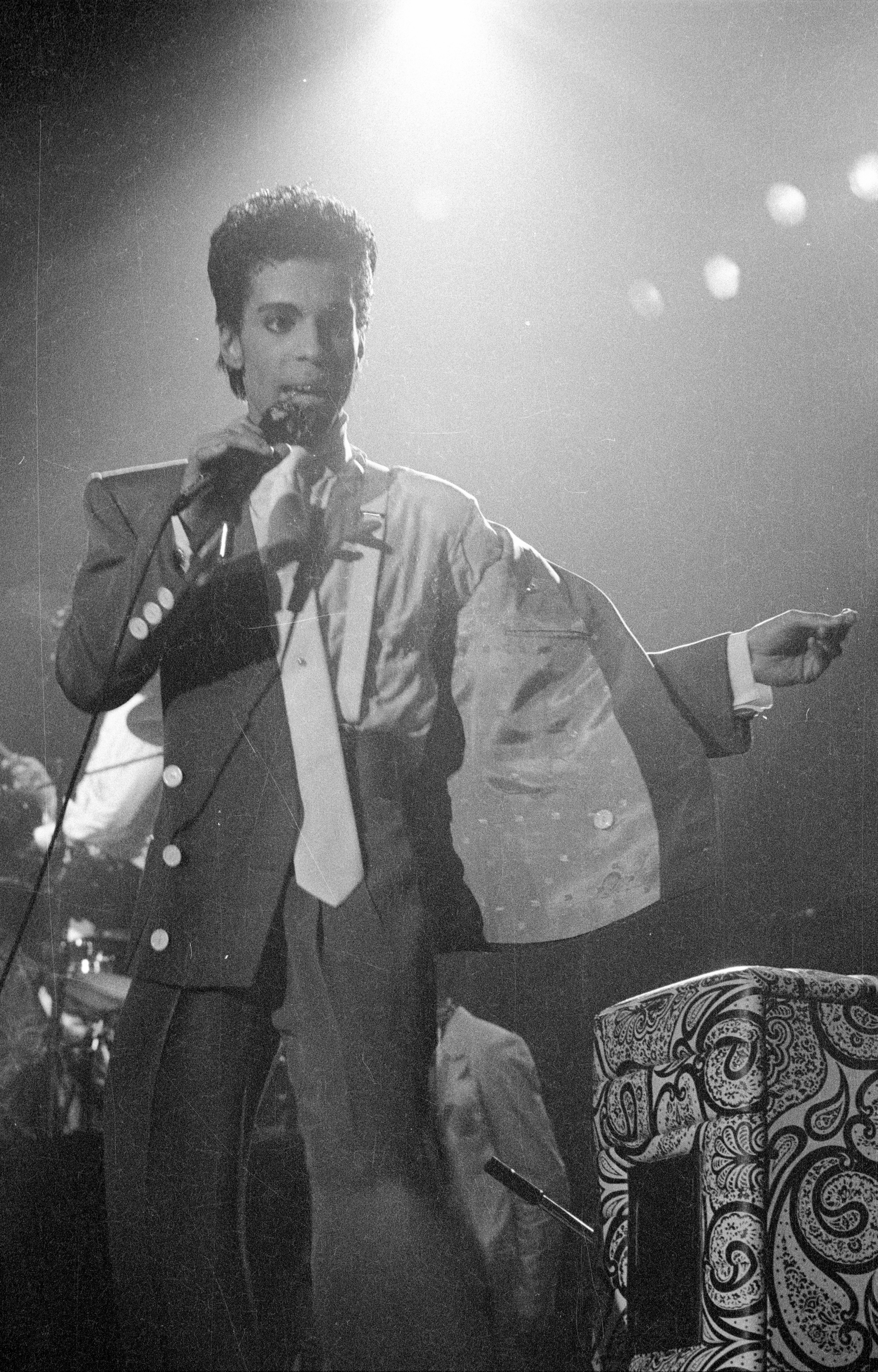
Easton had become closely associated with musician Prince during the 1980s, performing on tracks such as "Sugar Walls" and "U Got the Look", which earned both artists a Grammy Award nomination.

In January 1983, Easton duetted with Kenny Rogers and had a top 10 hit in the US with "We've Got Tonight", a cover of the Bob Seger song. The recording also earned her a number 1 single on the Country chart, and it reached the UK Top 30. Around the time of her hit record with Rogers, Easton headlined Act One, a one-hour variety special broadcast on NBC that featured Rogers and a cameo appearance by Johnny Carson. October 1983 saw the release of the album Best Kept Secret and its first single, the synthesized dance-pop tune "Telefone (Long Distance Love Affair)", became her fourth Top 10 hit. The single was Grammy-nominated for "Best Female Pop Vocal Performance" of 1983. The follow-up single, "Almost Over You", reached the US Top 30 and was a number 4 AC chart hit. "Almost Over You" was very popular in Asia and was covered by Chinese singer Cass Pang. It also became a hit on the Country charts for Lila McCann in 1998.

In 1984, Easton recorded a Spanish-language single, "Me Gustas Tal Como Eres" ("I Like You Just the Way You Are"), a duet with Mexican star Luis Miguel. The single earned her a second Grammy, this time for Best Mexican-American Performance. The track was taken from the album Todo Me Recuerda a Ti (1984), and reissued by Capitol/EMI-Latin in 1989, which featured Spanish-language covers of seven previous Easton recordings and three new tracks. In the same year, she also made a transformation into a sexy dance-pop siren, changing her performance style in the process. She was rewarded with the biggest-selling US album of her career, RIAA certified gold & platinum A Private Heaven (1984), and her sixth Top 10 US single, "Strut". In the UK, however, the move was not a commercial success, as Easton would find herself shut out of the UK top 75 for the next three years.

Her career was increasing, particularly in the US, where Easton was again nominated for a Grammy Award, this time for "Best Female Pop Vocal Performance" in 1984. She was also one of the first artists to have a music video banned because of its lyrics rather than its imagery; some broadcasters refused to air the sexually risqué "Sugar Walls", which had been written for her by Prince (using the pseudonym Alexander Nevermind). "Sugar Walls" was named by Tipper Gore of the Parents Music Resource Center as one of the "Filthy Fifteen", a list of songs deemed indecent because of their lyrics, alongside Prince's own "Darling Nikki". The song eventually hit number 3 on the R&B singles chart, number 9 on the Billboard Hot 100, and number 1 on the Billboard Dance Chart in 1985.

Easton's follow-up to A Private Heaven, entitled Do You (1985), was produced by Nile Rodgers and achieved gold status, although it failed to generate any breakout singles of the chart calibre of "Strut" or "Sugar Walls". In late 1985, Easton contributed "It's Christmas (All Over the World)" to the holiday release Santa Claus: The Movie. In 1987, the release of a follow-up album, No Sound But a Heart (1987), was hampered in the United States after an initial single release, "Eternity" (another Prince composition), failed to reach the pop, R&B or adult contemporary charts. The album's release moved from February to June; then in August the release was further held up as Easton's attorneys asked that the album be delayed after EMI Records was absorbed into EMI/Manhattan. (This did not prevent the album from being released in Canada, Europe and other territories.)

Songs from the album were covered by other artists: Crystal Gayle and Gary Morris featured "Wanna Give My Love" and "What if We Fall in Love" on a 1987 duet album named for the latter song; Celine Dion recorded "The Last to Know" on 1990's Unison while Mexican singer Yuri featured the tune on her album Espejos De Alma (1995); Patti LaBelle covered "Still in Love" on 1989's Be Yourself; Pia Zadora recorded "Floating Hearts" on 1989's Pia Z. No Sound But a Heart eventually did get released in the United States in 1999, with four bonus tracks, including Easton's contributions to the soundtrack of the 1986 film About Last Night, "Natural Love" and the Top 50 single "So Far, So Good".

=== 1987–1990: Genre shift and The Lover in Me ===
Easton performing "The Lover in Me" at the 1989 Soul Train Music Awards

In 1987, Easton appeared in Prince's concert film Sign o' the Times, during which she sang duet vocals for Prince's hit, "U Got the Look", which became a number 2 hit in the US. This led to Grammy nominations for "Best R&B Vocal, Duo or Group" and "Best R&B Song" of 1987. The track also marked a return to the singles charts in the United Kingdom for the first time in nearly four years, although Easton is not credited on the label for the song's single release. During her time collaborating with Prince, Easton was encouraged to write her own material. The most successful effort from their co-writings was "The Arms of Orion", another duet with Prince and a single from the Batman soundtrack (1989). The song reached number 36 on the Billboard Hot 100 and number 27 in the United Kingdom. She also co-wrote the song "Love '89" with Prince for Patti LaBelle's album Be Yourself and "La, La, La, He, He, Hee", which Prince recorded for the B-side of the single "Sign o' the Times". Tabloid press linked the two romantically, which she has always denied.

In November 1987, Easton made her first dramatic acting appearance on the television program Miami Vice, in which she played a singer named Caitlin Davies, whom Sonny Crockett was assigned to protect until her court appearance to render crucial testimony against certain corrupt music industry mavens. Sonny and Caitlin ended up married by the end of the episode, the first of five episodes for Easton. By the spring of 1988, a volume of the Miami Vice soundtrack was released and featured "Follow My Rainbow", which Easton had finished singing on her last appearance just moments before her character was eliminated and was included on her next album The Lover in Me (1988).

The album was released on her new label, MCA Records, and returned Easton to commercial prominence in both the United States and the United Kingdom, after the release of No Sound But a Heart was cancelled in the United States. The title song was released as the lead single, and reached number 2 on the Billboard Hot 100 and UK number 15 and became her biggest pop hit since "Morning Train". It also became a number 5 hit on the US Hot R&B/Hip-Hop Singles and Tracks chart, and was followed on the US R&B chart by "Days Like This" at number 35, but missed the Billboard Hot 100. The third single, the Prince-penned "101", made it to number 2 on the Billboard Dance chart. A final single, "No Deposit, No Return", was released and failed to replicate the success of the preceding singles and failed to make any chart appearance. Despite this, album received positive reviews and featured collaborations with L.A. Reid and Babyface, Prince, Angela Winbush and Jellybean Benitez.

As a result of her renewed popularity in the United Kingdom, Easton returned to her home country of Scotland to perform at The Big Day Festival in Glasgow, where her new American accent was booed by the crowd, subsequently resulting in bottles being thrown at her whilst performing on stage. Visibly shaken, she was forced to cut her set short and vowed never to perform in Scotland again.

=== 1991–2000: What Comes Naturally and decline ===
In 1991, What Comes Naturally became the last of Easton's albums to chart in the US, peaking at number 90 on the Billboard 200. The title song was also her last Top 40 single to date, reaching number 19 on the Billboard Hot 100. It also became her first hit in Australia since the mid-1980s, peaking at number 4. Two other singles, "You Can Swing It" and "To Anyone", followed but failed to chart. "What Comes Naturally" remained on the US pop chart for 10 weeks and 11 weeks on the ARIA Chart in Australia. Easton has songwriting credits on three tracks. She is also one of the few pop artists to adopt the new jack swing sound with chart success from the early 1990s. In 1992, an unofficial recording of "Modern Girl" (Live in San Diego) was released by "That's Life" recordings in Germany and Japan. The music was from her early output with EMI and became a sort of bootleg version of her concert when she performed stateside on her first worldwide tour in 1982. Easton followed this with the non-charting but critically acclaimed No Strings (1993), an album of jazz standards produced by Patrice Rushen. It included her version of "The Nearness of You", which was also featured on the soundtrack of the film, Indecent Proposal, in which Easton appeared in a cameo role. My Cherie (1995) was her last pop album to date to see domestic release in the United States. The album saw Sheena reunite with producer Christopher Neil for the first time in over a decade.

Easton contributed vocals to the soundtrack of All Dogs Go to Heaven 2 and voiced the character Sasha La Fleur on "Count Me Out" and "I Will Always Be With You". Easton also performed "Now and Forever" with Barry Manilow for The Pebble and the Penguin soundtrack in 1995. She contributed the theme song "Are There Angels" to the soundtrack for Shiloh in 1996; and provided the song "A Dream Worth Keeping" for the 1992 animated film FernGully: The Last Rainforest. In 1997, she played 'Melissa McCammon', a recording star, who is visited by time travellers from the future in a second-season episode of the Canadian television series The Outer Limits entitled "Falling Star". The episode featured her singing two songs from My Cherie. In the late 1990s, Easton retained an album contract with MCA Japan and released two discs of new material. However, neither album was originally released in the United States. Freedom, released in 1997 to coincide with the launch of her website and finally released in (Limited Edition) stateside in 2007, was a return to her trademark pop, including a remake of her debut single "Modern Girl". In 1999, Universal/Victor released the self-produced acoustic set, Home. Also, around this time, Sheena Easton Greatest Hits collection featuring 12 MCA singles recorded from 1988 to 1995 released and charted in Japan at number 98 (additional greatest hits collections surfaced in the US and UK but did not chart).

Easton adopted a boy (Jake) and girl (Skylar) between 1995 and 1996. Motherhood led her to curtail her appearances and focus on casino gigs, corporate shows and theatrical work. "Because I adopted my children, I could plan my timing", she told The Arizona Republic. "I knew exactly when they were coming along, so I knew when I had to change my life so it would be a stable life." Easton continued acting in America, starring in lead Broadway revivals of Man of La Mancha as (Aldonza) opposite Raul Julia in his last stage role (1992), and Grease as Rizzo (1996). Between 1994 and 1996, she played several characters in Gargoyles the animated series, including Lady Finella, the Banshee, Molly and Robyn Canmore. In 1999, she voice-acted a part-demon character, Annah-of-the-Shadows, in the computer game Planescape: Torment. She lives in Las Vegas with her two children and often performs in various casinos' entertainment venues. She voiced the character of Fiona Canmore for a scripted but unfinished episode of the cancelled animated feature, Team Atlantis.

In December 1998, Easton toured with the American production "The Colors of Christmas" with artists Roberta Flack, Melissa Manchester, Peabo Bryson and Jeffrey Osborne. Windham Hill Records produced "The Colors of Christmas" disc by Robbie Buchanan of holiday music. Easton contributed two tracks, "The Place Where We Belong" (a duet with Jeffrey Osborne) and "The Lord's Prayer". In 1999, New York–based One Way Records reserved the rights to release all of Easton's EMI-America catalogue. For the first time in the US, No Sound But a Heart was released, 12 years after the album was made available elsewhere. All of Easton's EMI back catalogue, with the exception of her Spanish-language album Todo Me Recuerda a Ti, was re-released and remastered with bonus tracks, incorporating B-sides and remixes. Universal Japan released Best Ballads, a disc of ballads from her six previous albums from her MCA catalogue with the exception of "For Your Eyes Only" for the Japanese market that failed to chart.

=== 2000–2015: Fabulous and re-issues ===
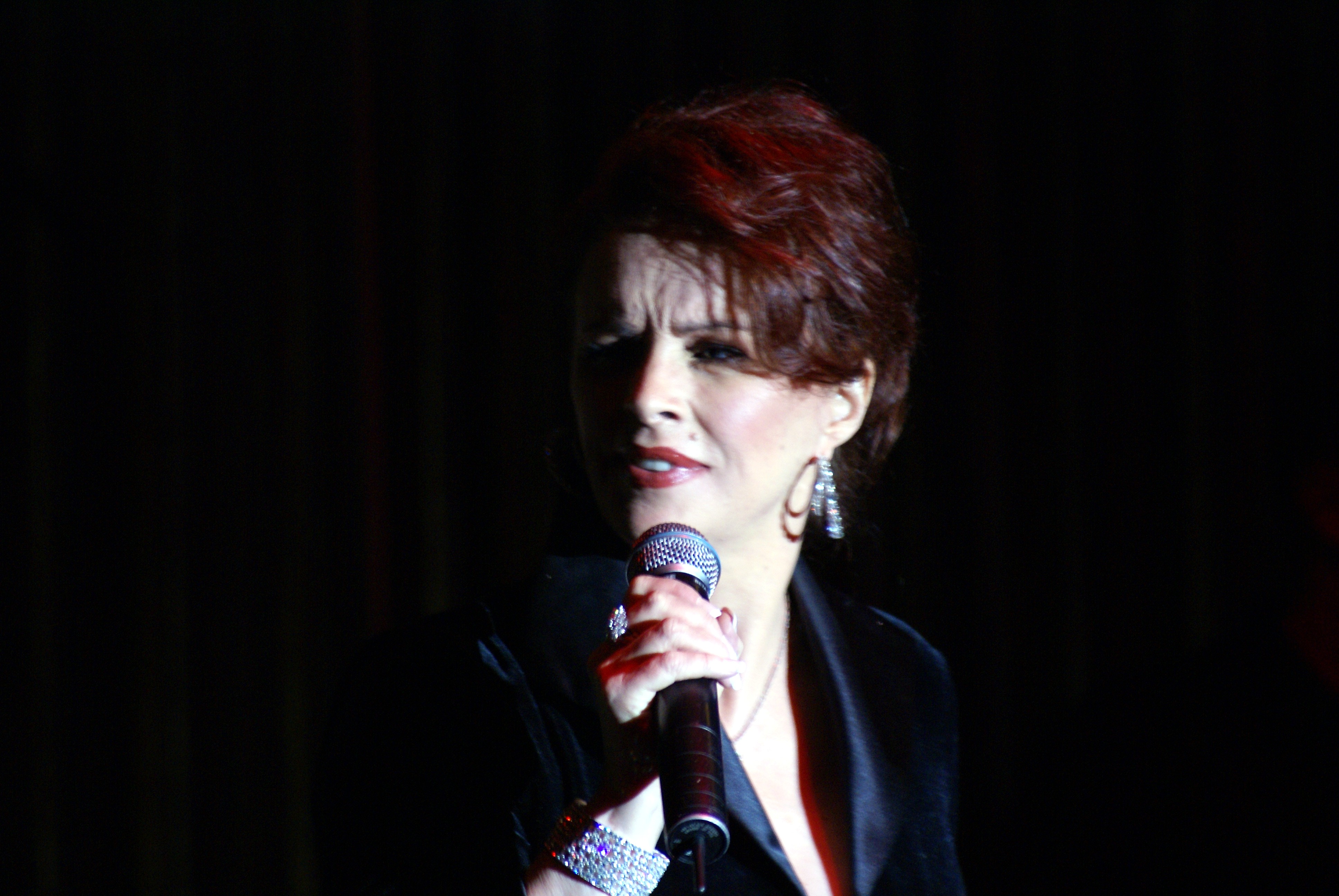
Easton performing live in 2009

Easton signed an album contract with Universal International UK, and attempted a comeback with Fabulous (2000), an album of classic disco covers. The first single, "Giving Up, Giving In", reached number 54 on the UK Singles Charts, and the album charted at number 185 on the UK Albums Charts. A second single, a cover of "Love Is in Control (Finger on the Trigger)" by Donna Summer, with double A-side "Don't Leave Me This Way", was withdrawn. The album was released throughout Europe, Japan, Australia, and Argentina, but not in the US. In Australia, Fabulous was released 24 February 2001 and Easton was asked to perform songs from the album to close out 2001 Sydney Gay and Lesbian Mardi Gras ceremonies. In 2003, Easton contributed vocals to "If You're Happy", a cover for a Japanese disc called Cover Morning Musume-Hello Project. She also began to host Vegas Live, a talk show with Clint Holmes (later replaced by Brian McKnight). In 2004, she was inducted into the Casino Legends Hall of Fame at the Tropicana Resort & Casino. Easton also contributed vocals to "What You Are" and "Eclipse of Time", two songs from the 2007 video game Lost Odyssey.

In February 2013, Demon Records, along with Edsel Records, reissued Easton's You Could Have Been with Me and Madness, Money & Music along with A Private Heaven and Do You in two compact disc packages remastered with bonus tracks, with the latter including the extended version of "Jimmy Mack" that has never been included on any of her reissues. In November 2014, a box set of Easton's first five albums in an original album series CD collection was released by Warner Music in the United Kingdom.

=== 2015–present: Recent work and re–issues ===
In 2015, Easton embarked on symphony concerts with guest vocalists entitled "The Spy Who Loved Me" with material from spy movies of the past and present and featuring Bond-style music with symphonies around the United States beginning in San Francisco from July 2015 and continuing into 2016. Easton also performed a small tour of dates during the latter part of 2015 in Australia featuring her Greatest Hits. In November 2016, Easton accepted the role of Dorothy Brock in the revival production of 42nd Street, which premiered on 20 March 2017 in London's West End, Drury Lane. Lulu replaced Easton in March 2018.

Easton performed at the 2021 New York State Fair, and on 17 September 2021, RT Industries in the United States, and Cherry Red Records in the United Kingdom, launched a re-issue campaign of her back catalog during her tenure with EMI Records, and issued the three-CD box set The Definitive Singles 1980–1987 all remastered from the original master recordings. The release collected all of Easton's English-language singles recorded for EMI Records, along with format-edit versions and some previously unreleased vault material together with additional releases throughout 2025.

On 19 November 2021, Apple Music made additional material available digitally, with the collections Best Ballads and Greatest Hits, which feature material from Easton's post-1987 era with MCA Records and Universal Records. In 2022, Cherry Red released the soundtrack to her 1982 TV special Live at the Palace, Hollywood on CD for the first time, along with the first DVD release of the show. In 2025, Cherry Red released box sets "Modern Girl" and "Strut". Following re–issues, the album A Private Heaven debuted at number 66 on the Scottish Albums Charts in March 2022, whilst the albums Madness, Money and Music and Do You debuted at numbers 46 respectively in Scotland in 2023 and 2024.

== Artistry ==
Easton is a soprano, whose voice was described by The New York Times music critic Stephen Holden as "piercingly direct in her attack and somewhat thin in timbre". He said her voice "fits squarely into the ... middle-of-the-road pop-rock genre".

== Personal life ==
Easton has been married and divorced four times and has two adopted children. Her first marriage was in Britain to Sandi Easton at the age of 19. The marriage lasted eight months. Sandi Easton later died in 1998, aged 48. Her second marriage in 1984 to Rob Light, a talent agent, ended after 18 months. Easton became a US citizen in 1992, carrying dual citizenship with the United Kingdom, and adopted her first child, Jake Rion Cousins Easton, in 1994. Two years later, she adopted again, this time a baby girl she named Skylar. In the summer of 1997, she met producer Tim Delarm while filming an episode of ESPN Canon Photo Safari in Yellowstone National Park and they married in Las Vegas in July 1997; the marriage lasted one year. On 9 November 2002, she married John Minoli, a Beverly Hills plastic surgeon; they divorced in 2003.

Easton described her 1990s casino residency as family-friendly, noting that her work hours began when her kids went to bed. During that time, she had grown tired of the endless cycle of touring, recording and doing "a bunch of TV". RuPaul said Easton's personal style inspired his "true high-femme sexy glamazon look".

Easton resides in Henderson, Nevada, US. She describes herself as a hardcore gamer, favoring World of Warcraft and Ghost of Tsushima. She was the voice of Annah-of-the-Shadows, a Tiefling thief and playable party member with extensive dialogue, in the 1999 PC role-playing game Planescape: Torment, a Black Isle Studios/Interplay production that explored the Dungeons & Dragons multiverse.

== Discography ==
- Take My Time / Sheena Easton (1981)
- You Could Have Been with Me (1981)
- Madness, Money & Music (1982)
- Best Kept Secret (1983)
- Todo Me Recuerda a Ti (1984)
- A Private Heaven (1984)
- Do You (1985)
- Shockwave (1986) "lost album" released (2026)
- No Sound But a Heart (1987)
- The Lover in Me (1988)
- What Comes Naturally (1991)
- No Strings (1993)
- My Cherie (1995)
- Freedom (1997)
- Home (1999)
- Fabulous (2000)

== Filmography ==
=== Film ===
Year	Title	Role	Notes
1981	For Your Eyes Only	Herself	Title credits only Only artist to perform a track during titles
1993	Indecent Proposal	Herself	
1993	Body Bags	Megan	Segment: "Hair"
1996	All Dogs Go to Heaven 2	Sasha la Fleur	Voice
1998	An All Dogs Christmas Carol	Sasha la Fleur	Voice
2004	Scooby-Doo! and the Loch Ness Monster	Fiona Pembrooke	Voice, direct-to-video

=== Television ===
Year	Title	Role	Notes
1981	The Grand Knockout Tournament	Herself	Television special
1987–1988	Miami Vice	Caitlin Davies	5 episodes
1989	It's Garry Shandling's Show	Herself	Episode: "Going, Going, Gone"
1993	Jack's Place	Gwen	Episode: "Watch Me Pull a Dream Out of My Hat"
1993	Highlander: The Series	Annie Devlin	Episode: "An Eye for an Eye"
1993	The Adventures of Brisco County, Jr.	Crystal Hawk	Episode: "Crystal Hawks"
1993	David Copperfield	Agnes	Voice, television film
1994	TekWar	War Bride	Television film
1995	Haunted Lives: True Ghost Stories	Janet	Episode: "The Headless Ghost"
1995–1996	Gargoyles	Robyn Canmore, Banshee, Molly, Finella	Voice, 6 episodes
1996	The Outer Limits	Melissa McCammon	Episode: "Falling Star"
1996–1997	Road Rovers	Groomer, Mrs. British Prime Minister	Voice, 10 episodes
1996–1998	All Dogs Go to Heaven: The Series	Sasha La Fleur	Voice, 22 episodes
1997	Duckman	Betty	Voice, episode: "Aged Heat 2: Women in Heat"
1997	The Sylvester & Tweety Mysteries	Trixie	Voice, episode: "Yelp!"
1999	The Wild Thornberrys	Doe	Voice, episode: "Pal Joey"
1999	Chicken Soup for the Soul	Vicky	Episode: "Sand Castles"
2001	The Legend of Tarzan	Robin Doyle	Voice, 2 episodes
2005	Young Blades	Queen Anne	8 episodes
2009	Phineas and Ferb	Doofenshmirtz's Girlfriend	Voice, episode: "Chez Platypus"

== Tours ==
=== Concert tours ===
- Sheena Easton World Tour (1982)
- A Private Heaven Tour (1984)
- No Sound But a Heart Tour (1987)
- Sheena Easton World Tour (1989)
- Japan Greatest Hits Tour (1995)
- The Colors of Christmas Tour (1997-1998, 2001, 2003)
- Australia Greatest Hits Tour (2015)
- Sheena Easton The Spy Who Loved Me Symphony Concerts (2015-2016)
- Sheena Easton Reimagined New York State Fair Concert (2021)

=== Vegas residencies ===
- At the Copa with David Cassidy (2000-2001)
- Sheena Easton For Your Ears Only (2002-2003)
- The Sheena Easton Show (2013-2014)

== Awards and nominations ==
=== American Music Awards ===
Year	Nominee / work	Award	Result
1982	Sheena Easton	Favorite Pop/Rock Female Artist	Nominated

=== Billboard Music Award ===
Year	Nominee / work	Award	Result
1981	Sheena Easton	Top Pop New Artist	Won
2004	Sheena Easton	Top Pop Artists of the Past 25 Years chart	number 58

=== Grammy Awards ===
The Grammy Awards are awarded annually by the National Academy of Recording Arts and Sciences. Easton has won two awards from six nominations.

Year	Nominee / work	Award	Result
1982	Sheena Easton	Best New Artist	Won
1982	"For Your Eyes Only"	Best Female Pop Vocal Performance	Nominated
1984	"Telefone (Long Distance Love Affair)"	Best Female Pop Vocal Performance	Nominated
1985	"Strut"	Best Female Pop Vocal Performance	Nominated
1985	Me Gustas Tal Como Eres (with Luis Miguel)	Best Mexican-American Performance	Won
1988	"U Got the Look"^{[1]} (with Prince)	Best R&B Performance by a Duo or Group with Vocal	Nominated

Notes

- ^{^[1]}: The song was also nominated for the Grammy Award for Best R&B Song, but this nomination is credited to the songwriter (Prince) and not to Easton.

=== Golden Globe ===
Year	Nominee / work	Award	Result
1982	"For Your Eyes Only"	Best Original Song	Nominated

=== MTV Video Music Awards ===
Year	Nominee / work	Award	Result
1988	"U Got the Look"	Best Stage Performance in a Video	Won
1988	"U Got the Look"	Best Male Video	Won

== See also ==
- List of artists who reached number one in the United States
- List of artists who reached number one on the U.S. Dance Club Songs chart
