= Telefone (Long Distance Love Affair) =

Single by Sheena Easton

from the album Best Kept Secret
- B-side: "Wish You Were Here Tonight"
- Released: August 1983
- Genre: Synth-pop; new wave
- Length: 3:41
- Label: EMI America; RT Industries (current)
- Songwriters: Greg Mathieson; Trevor Veitch
- Producer: Greg Mathieson

Sheena Easton singles chronology
"We've Got Tonight" (1983)	"Telefone (Long Distance Love Affair)" (1983)	"Almost Over You" (1983)

Alternative cover

"Telefone (Long Distance Love Affair)" is a song by Scottish singer Sheena Easton, released as the first single from her fourth album, 1983's Best Kept Secret. In November 1984, Easton added "Telefono" to her Spanish album Todo Me Recuerda a Ti for the Latin markets. The song was nominated for a Grammy in 1983 for Best Female Pop Vocal Performance.

The song was most successful in the United States, where it became Easton's fourth top 10 hit, peaking at number nine for two weeks in October and November 1983. The song was less successful in Easton's native United Kingdom where it reached number 84.

The music video, shot in black and white, featured Easton in a haunted house and a cemetery, being pursued by Dracula, Frankenstein's monster, and the Hunchback of Notre Dame before being rescued by King Kong.

== Charts ==
Chart (1983–84)	Peak position
Canada Top Singles (RPM)	3
Colombia Singles Chart	1
UK Singles (OCC)	84
US Billboard Hot 100	9
U.S. Radio & Records CHR/Pop Airplay Chart	9
U.S. Billboard Dance/Disco Top 80	9
US Adult Contemporary (Billboard)	27
