= Modern Girl (Sheena Easton song) =

Single by Sheena Easton

from the album Take My Time
- B-side: "Paradox" (UK) "Summer's Over" (US)
- Released: 29 February 1980 (UK); May 1981 (US)
- Recorded: December 1979
- Genre: Dance-pop; synth-pop; post-disco
- Length: 3:35
- Label: EMI (original), RT Industries (current)
- Songwriters: Frank Musker; Dominic Bugatti
- Producer: Christopher Neil

Sheena Easton singles chronology
"Modern Girl" (1980)	"9 to 5" (1980)

"Modern Girl" is the debut single by Scottish pop singer Sheena Easton. The song was originally released in February 1980, reaching #56 in the UK charts, before being re-released to top ten success in August of the same year. The song would also go on to reach the US top 20, when it was released in 1981 as her second single, following the #1 hit "Morning Train (9 to 5)".

== Background ==
Exposure on the BBC television production The Big Time not only resulted in a record deal with EMI, but also pushed Easton's 1980 debut singles, "Modern Girl" and " 9 to 5", into the UK top ten. Her debut LP, Take My Time, followed in January 1981. In the US, "9 to 5" was released in February 1981 under the title "Morning Train", to avoid confusion with Dolly Parton's recent hit of the same name; regardless, the single topped the U.S. pop charts. "Modern Girl" was then released as the second US single in May and peaked at #18 in July.

In 1997 Easton re-recorded this song for her album Freedom for the Japanese market and released it as the first single.

== Cover versions ==
Mona Carita recorded "Modern Girl" in Finnish as "Nykyaikainen" as the title cut for her 1981 album.

"Modern Girl" was covered by Japanese pop group Sonia on their 1995 album, Tenchi Muyo!. This version used the chorus and the first verse, but changed the second and third verses to Japanese lyrics. "Modern Girl" was covered by the UK's Camera Obscura for the Q Magazine disc, Q Covered the Eighties in 2005.

== In popular culture ==
"Modern Girl" is included in the arcade game Dance Dance Revolution SuperNova worldwide, and in that game's PlayStation 2 version in Japan. In the arcade sequel, Dance Dance Revolution SuperNova 2, it is the default song in Beginner mode. "Modern Girl" makes a final arcade appearance in Dance Dance Revolution X before being removed from the series. "Modern Girl" was used in the 2015 KFC (Kentucky Fried Chicken) new Rice box campaign commercials in the UK.

== Charts ==
=== Weekly charts ===
Chart (1980–81)	Peak position
Canadian Singles Chart	19
Ireland Singles Chart	10
Japan Oricon Singles Chart	18
Luxembourg (Radio Luxembourg)	3
UK Singles Chart	8
US Billboard Hot 100	18
US Cash Box Top 100	15
UK Record Mirror/RM Pop Dance Chart	2
US Billboard Adult Contemporary	13

=== Year-end charts ===
Chart (1981)	Rank
US Billboard Hot 100	95
