= The Big Time (TV series) =

1976 British documentary television series

- Genre: Documentary
- Directed by: First run (1976–1981): Ian Sharp; Patricia Houlihan; Nick Handel; Henry Murray; Pieter Morpurgo; Second run (1982–1987): Ruth Jackson; Patricia Houlihan; Nick Handel; Tony Salmon; John Bird; Terence O'Reilly
- Presented by: First run (1976–1981): Esther Rantzen; John Pitman; Paul Heiney; Norma Shepherd; Second run (1982–1987): Chris Serle; Paul Heiney
- Country of origin: United Kingdom
- No. of seasons: 6
- No. of episodes: 33

Production
- Executive producers: Esther Rantzen (1976–1981); Nick Handel (1982–1987)
- Producers: Esther Rantzen (1976–1981); Various (1982–1987)
- Running time: 50 minutes

Original release
- Network: BBC 1
- Release: 28 October 1976 – 17 June 1987

Related
- In at the Deep End; Jobs for the Boys; Jobs for the Girls

The Big Time is a British documentary and reality television series made by the BBC, consisting of fifteen original episodes which ran from 1976 to 1980. A revised, extended repeat of episode twelve was broadcast in 1981.

Devised and produced by Esther Rantzen, and narrated initially by Rantzen, but later by John Pitman, Paul Heiney and Norma Shepherd, each programme followed a member of the public placed in the limelight as a result of their skill and documenting how they fared. Their progress was filmed and sundry professionals in their fields advised the amateur as they progressed.

Some of the exploits included an amateur musician conducting an orchestra at the Fairfield Halls; a housewife becoming a television presenter; a cookery competition winner becoming head chef for the day at The Dorchester hotel and preparing a banquet lunch for former Prime Minister Edward Heath; an amateur wrestler taking on professional John Naylor on a bill at the Albert Hall on 26 March 1980 (the amateur was given the stage name 'Rip Rawlinson'); a model entering the Miss United Kingdom beauty contest; an amateur footballer (Lol Cottrell) being trained by Liverpool player Tommy Smith to take part in the latter's testimonial game; a young gymnast who became a circus trapeze artist; an amateur singer getting the chance to record a single. The latter 'discovered' the singer Sheena Easton (with a follow-up Big Time special episode airing a year later, after she achieved stardom) and the edition featuring the amateur chef is credited as terminating the television career of the television chef Fanny Cradock, who criticised the amateur's choice of menu.

When the series ended, the BBC commissioned In at the Deep End, which followed the same format only using two presenters, Chris Serle and erstwhile The Big Time reporter Paul Heiney (former reporters on Rantzen's That's Life!), as they undertook various tasks as complete beginners in professional roles.

Further versions of the format followed, when Hale and Pace (comedians Gareth Hale and Norman Pace) presented a short-lived series Jobs for the Boys on BBC1 in 1997, where they undertook professional tasks as complete amateurs. The four episodes featured the pair attempting to become professional polo players, dress designers, producers of a television commercial and an effort to write the British's 1998 Eurovision Song Contest entry. This format followed 1995's Jobs for the Girls, when Birds of a Feather stars Pauline Quirke and Linda Robson undertook four similar tasks.

== The Gwen Troake incident ==
In 1976, a housewife in Devon, Gwen Troake, won a competition called "Cook of the Realm", leading to The Big Time inviting her to organise a banquet to be attended by Edward Heath, Lord Mountbatten and other VIPs. The BBC filmed the result as part of The Big Time, and asked Fanny Cradock, by then a tax exile in Ireland, to act as one of a number of experts giving Troake advice on her menu.

The result brought the end of Fanny Cradock's television career. Mrs Troake went through her menu of seafood cocktail, duckling with bramble sauce and coffee cream dessert. Fanny, grimacing and acting as if on the verge of retching, claimed not to know what a bramble was, told Troake that her menu was too rich, and, though she accepted that the dessert was delicious, insisted that it was not suitable, declaring: "Yes, dear, but you're among professionals now."

She suggested, for a better dessert, that Mrs Troake use a small pastry boat filled with a fruit sorbet and covered with spun sugar, decorated with an orange slice and a cherry through a cocktail stick, giving the dish the look of a small boat, which Fanny thought would be suitable for the naval guests. In the event, the dessert was a disaster and could not be served properly - the spun sugar toppings were collapsing in the heat of the kitchen before they reached the main dining area and the fragile nature of the pudding meant that some of them broke apart before being served. Robert Morley had also been consulted on the menu and said he felt that Mrs Troake's original coffee pudding was perfect.

When the dessert failed to impress, the public were annoyed that Fanny Cradock had seemingly ruined Mrs Troake's special day. The Daily Telegraph wrote "Not since 1940 can the people of England have risen in such unified wrath". Fanny wrote a letter of apology to Mrs Troake, but it was too late, the BBC terminated her contract two weeks after the programme was broadcast. She never presented a cookery programme again on the BBC. (Mrs Troake, by contrast, published A Country Cookbook the following year.) Speaking about the incident in 1999, Rantzen described Cradock as "hell on wheels", and that she had "reduced this poor little lady [Troake] to nothing".

== Episodes ==
=== Series 1 ===
Broadcast Thursday evenings on BBC1 at 9:25 pm

No. overall	No. in series	Title	Directed by	Original release date
1	1	"Ada Johnston's Dress"	Ian Sharp	28 October 1976
Reporter: Esther Rantzen. Mrs. Ada Johnston, a needlewoman from Scotland, designs the dress of her dreams for a top fashion show. She meets Norman Hartnell, Norman Parkinson, Gina Fratini, Zandra Rhodes and many other experts she has always admired, who advise her.
2	2	"Rev Jimmy James edits The Times Diary"	Ian Sharp	4 November 1976
Reporter: Esther Rantzen. The Reverend Jimmy James, a rector from Norfolk, who normally edits his parish magazine, the Wensum Diary, for one day edits The Times Diary. He meets Alan Brien, Paul Callan, Malcolm Muggeridge, William Rees-Mogg and many other experts he has always admired, who advise him.
3	3	"Gwen Troake's Banquet"	Ian Sharp	11 November 1976
Reporter: Esther Rantzen. Mrs Gwen Troake, a farmer's wife from Devon, plans the menu for a banquet at the Dorchester Hotel, London. It is a Foyle's Literary Lunch in honour of Edward Heath, and Gwen meets Fanny Cradock, chef Eugène Käufeler, Robert Morley, Magnus Pyke and many other experts she has always admired, who advise her.
4	4	"Joan Barrow – Jockey"	Ian Sharp	25 November 1976
Reporter: Esther Rantzen. Mrs Joan Barrow, a farmer's wife from the Cotswolds, goes into training for her first race under National Hunt rules. It is a dangerous and strenuous sport and to prepare herself Joan meets Sue Horton, Peter O'Sullevan, Richard Pitman, Graham Thorner and David Nicholson, who advise her.
5	5	"Bryan Cresswell Conducts"	Ian Sharp	2 December 1976
Reporter: Esther Rantzen. Bryan Cresswell, a Civil Servant from Newcastle, conducts the Royal Philharmonic Orchestra for a concert at the Fairfield Halls. He chooses an exciting overture to conduct and then meets Professor James Blades, Richard Rodney Bennett, Owain Arwel Hughes, Yehudi Menuhin and many other experts he has admired, who advise him.
6	6	"Tony Peers – Comedian"	Ian Sharp	9 December 1976
Reporter: Esther Rantzen. Tony Peers, a comedian at Butlin's Holiday Camp, is given the chance to appear on BBCtv's Seaside Special – if he can make his act good enough. He meets some of the top names in comedy – Arthur Askey, Bill Cotton, Ken Dodd, Roy Hudd, Spike Milligan, Bob Monkhouse, Eric Morecambe, Ernie Wise and three scriptwriters, who advise him.

=== Series 2 ===
Broadcast Thursday evenings on BBC1 at 9:25 pm

No. overall	No. in series	Title	Directed by	Original release date
7	1	"Trapeze Girl"	Henry Murray	24 November 1977
Reporter: Esther Rantzen. A 17-year-old girl from a children's home, who is an amateur gymnast, trains for the high trapeze. It is the most dangerous act in the circus – many trapeze artists fall to their death. The Big Time follows her two months' training, meet the stars of the circus-and then wait to see if she succeeds.
8	2	"Lol Cottrell plays for Liverpool"	Ian Sharp	1 December 1977
Reporter: John Pitman. The adventures of Lol Cottrell, a 28-year-old baker's roundsman, who has always dreamed of playing football for Liverpool. This year he did – in Tommy Smith's testimonial game. Coached by Tommy – the 'Iron Man of Anfield' – Lol spends two weeks training for his big match and collecting advice from the Liverpool team and top professionals like Denis Law, Bill Shankly and Jimmy Hill.
--	3	"Gwen Troake's Banquet"	Ian Sharp	8 December 1977
Repeat episode from series 1.
9	4	"Jane Manders – Beauty Queen"	Patricia Houlihan	15 December 1977
Reporter: John Pitman. Jane Manders prepares for the 'Miss United Kingdom' contest. She is a Welsh schoolteacher – she has never taken part in a bathing-beauty contest before. In two weeks she has to learn what to wear, how to make-up, how to walk, and what to say. Top experts including ex-Miss Worlds, Michael Aspel, and columnist Jean Rook, advise her.
--	5	"Joan Barrow – Jockey"	Ian Sharp	22 December 1977
Repeat episode from series 1.

=== Series 3 ===
Broadcast Wednesday evenings on BBC1 at 8:10 pm

No. overall	No. in series	Title	Directed by	Original release date
10	1	"Keith Rawlinson – Wrestler"	Nick Handel	11 June 1980
Reporter: Paul Heiney. Keith Rawlinson is a schoolmaster in Burnley – but he has always longed to be a professional wrestler. It takes three months of strict training and body building during which Keith is advised by some of the biggest names in wrestling including Kent Walton, Big Daddy and World Lightweight Champion, Johnny Saint. His big moment is a match – in an all-star bill at the most glamorous wrestling venue in the country – London's Royal Albert Hall.
11	2	"Tim Davey – Racing Driver"	Henry Murray	25 June 1980
Reporter: Norma Shepherd. Tim Davey is a law student, his hobby is go-karting – he dreamed of becoming a racing driver. He never thought that dream would come true. The Big Time gave him the chance of competing in a professional race at Brands Hatch. He trained for four months, practiced with Mark Thatcher and met his heroes: James Hunt, Stirling Moss, Mario Andretti, Emerson Fittipaldi, Niki Lauda, Jody Scheckter and Gilles Villeneuve.
12	3	"Sheena Easton – Pop Singer"	Patricia Houlihan	2 July 1980
Reporter: John Pitman. Sheena Easton is a 19-year-old student from Glasgow, who has always dreamed of becoming a pop star. A major recording company agreed, if she was good enough, to let her make a record. Sheena is photographed by Patrick Lichfield, advised by stars like Lulu, Dusty Springfield and Dorothy Squires, packaged and produced by one of the top recording men, Christopher Neil. Finally, she made the record, but will it be a hit?
13	4	"The Rev Taffy Davies – Cartoonist"	Patricia Houlihan	9 July 1980
Reporter: Paul Heiney. The Rev Taffy Davies is a curate from Southsea. Since the day he picked up a pen and drew a less-than-flattering caricature of the Archbishop of Canterbury, it has been his ambition to be a Fleet Street cartoonist. He achieves that ambition in the Daily Mail. He meets Sir Osbert Lancaster, Bill Tidy, Mac and many other famous cartoonists, who give Taffy advice on how to get to the top in what he calls his personal 'land of milk and honey' – Fleet Street.
14	5	"Sue Peacock – TV Presenter"	Pieter Morpurgo	16 July 1980
Reporter: Paul Heiney. Sue Peacock is a housewife from Cheshire. She is used to giving talks to her local Women's Institute, but with the help of The Big Time she gets an audience of ten-million as she goes, for the first time ever, before live TV cameras to present Nationwide. Frank Bough, Bob Wellings and Sue Lawley help to prepare her for the big night and, with advice from top TV personalities, David Frost, Esther Rantzen, Sir Robin Day and Angela Rippon, she sits, for one night only, in one of the hottest seats in television.
15	6	"The Beaminster and District Gardens and Allotment Society go to Chelsea"	Nick Handel	23 July 1980
Reporter: John Pitman. The members of a gardening club in Dorset never dreamed they'd be allowed to design a garden for the Royal Horticultural Society's Chelsea Flower Show. The garden was entirely planned and stocked by the amateurs, though they were advised by professionals like Percy Thrower, Geoffrey Smith and Bill Sowerbutts. In the end, the little local society compete with professional nurserymen from all over the world and try to win a coveted gold medal to take back to Beaminster.
--	7	"Sheena Easton – The Making of a Star"	Patricia Houlihan	21 April 1981 at 7:20pm
Reporter: John Pitman. The story of Sheena Easton is a real Cinderella story. It began two years ago when the 19-year-old drama student from Glasgow was given the chance to make a pop record for The Big Time. After seeking advice from Dusty Springfield, Lulu and the inimitable Dorothy Squires, Sheena cut a record called "Modern Girl". It was a hit – and two more Top 20 singles followed. Today she's a star. This programme charts her meteoric rise to fame – starting back in Glasgow and ending with Sheena being voted Britain's Top Female Singer and receiving the ultimate accolade – appearing at the Royal Variety Performance. (This episode was repeated again on 10 December 1981 on BBC2 at 3:55PM under the title Women of Our Time.)

== In at the Deep End ==
An almost identical series followed in 1982 entitled In at the Deep End, which followed the same format as The Big Time only using two celebrities, Chris Serle and Paul Heiney, as they undertook various tasks as complete beginners in professional roles. Challenges included Serle taking part in a ballroom dancing competition and becoming a snooker player partnering World champion Steve Davis in a mixed-doubles event and Heiney becoming a chef at Langhan's Brasserie, a dress designer for a catwalk show, a celebrity hairdresser (where he cut Jilly Cooper's hair), directing Bananarama's video for "A Trick of the Night" and an actor in a Michael Caine movie.

=== Series 1 ===
Broadcast Tuesday evenings on BBC1 at 7:45 pm

No. overall	No. in series	Title	Directed by	Original release date
1	1	"Episode 1"	Patricia Houlihan	7 September 1982
Reporter: Chris Serle. Chris enters the elegant and sequinned world of competitive ballroom dancing. With the help of Latin American world champions, Donnie Burns & Gaynor Fairweather, he attempts to master the pasodoble. Along the way he seeks advice from some of the greatest names in the dancing world. He tarantellas with Wayne Sleep, waltzes with Bill and Bobbie Irvine, rocks with Hot Gossip, gossips with Terry Wogan and tries formation dancing with Peggy Spencer's Latin Team. The climax is the United Kingdom Ballroom Dancing Championships, where Chris competes against other would-be champions.
2	2	"Episode 2"	Nick Handel	14 September 1982
Reporter: Paul Heiney. Paul becomes a stand-up comedian performing a spot as a female impersonator in front of one of the most critical audiences in show business on the bill of the 'Oscar Night' of Clubland. His act is written by Jimmy Perry. Paul is advised and encouraged by the top names in comedy including Ken Dodd, Danny La Rue, Little and Large, Beryl Reid and Marti Caine.
3	3	"Episode 3"	Tony Salmon	21 September 1982
Reporter: Chris Serle. Chris tests his nerve in the gruelling, high speed world of rallying. His target is one of the world's toughest motoring events, the RAC Rally, co-driving for Britain's top star, Roger Clark. Rally aces Rauno Aaltonen and John Taylor have only two months to teach weekend driver Chris how not to go for a spin; Jackie Stewart and Stirling Moss give Chris a crash course in fast driving on the circuit at Brands Hatch. But even with all this expert advice nothing can prepare Chris for what the RAC Rally has in store.
4	4	"Episode 4"	Ruth Jackson	28 September 1982
Reporter: Paul Heiney. Paul takes the reins to compete with the country's top horse drivers in a gruelling three-day event which includes a 15-mile cross-country marathon. As a total newcomer to horses, he is trained by top international driver John Parker. Paul meets his childhood hero, Charlton Heston, who drove the famous chariot race in Ben Hur, and is advised by some of the top names in the horse world, including The Duke of Edinburgh, George Bowman and Harvey Smith. And in true competitive spirit, he takes a bet with Lancashire night-club owner Joe Pullen that he will beat him in the big event.
5	5	"Episode 5"	Nick Handel	5 October 1982
Reporter: Chris Serle. Chris becomes a butler for a weekend house party at Lord Hertford's 110-room stately home in Warwickshire and learns that there's more to being a 'gentleman's gentleman' than he'd ever imagined. On the way to his big weekend Chris explores the fascinating world of Upstairs, Downstairs in some of the country's great houses, goes through butler training school, serves lunch to Clement Freud MP, meets Margaret Powell and is groomed by the creator of Mr Hudson, TV's best-known butler, Gordon Jackson.
6	6	"Episode 6"	Patricia Houlihan	12 October 1982
Reporter: Paul Heiney. Paul explores the booming world of romantic fiction, and attempts to turn love into money. Paul sets out to write a romantic short story for Woman's Weekly, the largest selling woman's magazine in the world and discovers that it is not as simple as it seems. As his ideas are rejected and reshaped, Paul turns for advice to the great names in the field. He meets Barbara Cartland, Molly Parkin, author of Love Biter, and talks to Erich Segal who wrote the best seller Love Story and discovered that love means never having to say sorry to your bank manager.

=== Series 2 ===
Broadcast Wednesday evenings on BBC1 at 9:25 pm

No. overall	No. in series	Title	Directed by	Original release date
7	1	"Film Actor"	Nick Handel	24 October 1984
Reporter: Paul Heiney. Paul is an absolute beginner. Now he must work for the chance to play a brutal German mercenary who tries to throttle Michael Caine. The film is Water, a major new feature written and produced by Dick Clement and Ian La Frenais. Paul goes to RADA hoping to become the most dangerous man you've ever seen. He visits Oliver Reed to ask how to play a screen heavy – and finds he has taken on more than he expected. A Hollywood dialect doctor teaches him the German accent. And he must learn to fight like a trained killer. Before Paul faces the camera, Billy Connolly and Brenda Vaccaro offer last-minute advice.
8	2	"Snooker Player"	Nick Handel	31 October 1984
Reporter: Chris Serle. Chris learns what it takes to perform in the high-pressure professional snooker arena. His target is the chance to partner World Champion Steve Davis in a doubles match before an audience of a thousand fans. At stake is the Matchroom Challenge Trophy. First come months of coaching and advice from some of the greatest stars in the game, including Terry Griffiths, Ray Reardon and Cliff Thorburn. Chris goes behind the scenes of a major televised tournament and enters the English Amateur Snooker Championship. He finds that, under the stress and pressure of matchplay, the balls are liable to go anywhere but into the pockets. On the big night, he and the World Champion must face Alex Higgins, Davis's greatest rival, and his partner Tony Meo.
9	3	"One Dog and his Man"	Patricia Houlihan	7 November 1984
Reporter: Paul Heiney. Paul has never had to cope with so much as a poodle. Now he needs to achieve an almost telepathic understanding with Tim, his sheepdog, in order to compete at the Woburn Abbey trial. Paul and Tim discover some remote and beautiful comers of the British Isles, as they seek help and advice from farmers and shepherds who are top trialists. They meet Phil Drabble and Eric Halsall of One Man and His Dog fame at Chatsworth, learn all about 'sheep sense' at a Cumbrian 'merry meet', and struggle to master the mysteries of the Drive, the Pen and the Maltese Cross.
10	4	"Opera Singer"	Nick Handel	14 November 1984
Reporter: Chris Serle. Chris' musical experience is confined to banging on the drums with the Crouch End All Stars in his local pub. Now he has to master the world of grand opera. His aim is to sing a role with the English National Opera on the stage of the massive London Coliseum. Coached by Sir Geraint Evans and advised by producer Jonathan Miller, conductor Sir Georg Solti and the world-famous Italian baritone, the late Tito Gobbi, Chris finally lands the part of a 90-year-old butler in The Gambler by Prokofiev. He must learn to project his voice over an 80-piece orchestra and to do his own character make-up. Life becomes more difficult still when, shortly before opening night, Chris breaks his foot in a motorcycle accident. But the show must go on.
11	5	"Fashion Designer"	John Bird	21 November 1984
Reporter: Paul Heiney. Paul's total achievement in art is an O-level pass. It is not the highest qualification for a would-be world-class fashion designer. There's to be a gala fashion show at Guildhall, in the City of London. Royalty will be there. Paul sets his sight on this glittering evening. To get there, he has to design the Heiney Collection -a dress for a royal garden party, a suit to wear about town, and a glamorous ball-gown. For guidance Paul turns to fashionable Bruce Oldfield, designer to princesses and film stars. Help and criticism comes from Jean Muir and Hardy Amies. It is film star Charlotte Rampling who Paul has in mind when he designs his dresses – and she tells him just what she feels about them. After six months, Paul's dresses are finished. International model Michele Paradise is to wear them. But how will they be received when she steps out on the catwalk?
12	6	"Auctioneer"	Patricia Houlihan	28 November 1984
Reporter: Chris Serle. Chris hopes to make it as an auctioneer at Sotheby's, the world's largest auction house. But it seems a tall order as he falters through his first attempts – at a small country sale in Norfolk, and the biggest cattle market in Europe. He visits tobacco auctions in America for advice from the 500-word-a-minute champions, whose tongues 'wag at both ends'. And he picks up tips from the legendary Peter Wilson, in the elegant salerooms of Monte Carlo. Chris, as he struggles with practice sessions at Sotheby's, and consults top dealers, salesmen and buyers like actor Brian Glover.

=== Series 3 ===
No. overall	No. in series	Title	Directed by	Original release date
13	1	"Rock Video Director"	Nick Handel	10 February 1987
Reporter: Paul Heiney. Paul has been a radio and television presenter for 12 years. Now he must master a very different world – behind the cameras. His target is to direct a video for a major rock star. Paul goes to the BBC's training studio to learn to direct a pop number. Film director Ken Russell helps him make a demonstration video which, Paul hopes, will convince Bananarama that he's got what it takes to make the promo for their new single "A Trick of the Night". It will mean directing a film crew of 30 all through the night and the film must be good enough to be shown on those all-important TV pop programmes.
14	2	"Fastnet Race Skipper"	Terence O'Reilly	20 May 1987
Reporter: Chris Serle. The closest Chris Serle has come to sailing is drinking other people's gin and tonic on other people's boats. Now he approaches the Royal Ocean Racing Club to find out if he can skipper a yacht in Britain's premier off-shore race. In 1979, 15 yachtsmen lost their lives when a devastating storm struck the Fastnet fleet. Before he can even consider leading a crew on the 1985 race, Chris must learn to sail from scratch, absorb a thorough knowledge of navigation, meteorology, safety at sea – and how to motivate the crew to win. After a tough summer of gruelling training from sailing instructor Roger Justice, and advice from some of the world's most successful skippers, including Chay Blyth, Clare Francis and Harold Cudmore, Chris and his crew aboard 'True Brit' cross the Fastnet start line.
15	3	"Hairdresser"	Nick Handel	27 May 1987
Reporter: Paul Heiney. Paul hopes, after three months' training, to cut a completely new style on a celebrity lady. But will anyone let him? For weeks Paul shampoos, blowdries, cuts 'bobs' and 'shakes' and consults some of the top stylists in the country including Vidal Sassoon and actress Pamela Stephenson. Cutting ladies' hair turns out to be one of his most nerve-racking assignments. Jilly Cooper is to present British hairdressing's top award at the London Hilton. She's to have a stunning new style for the occasion – but will she trust Paul to create it?
16	4	"Bookmaker"	Richard Lightbody	3 June 1987
Reporter: Chris Serle. Chris hardly knows how to place a bet at the start of his training as a racecourse bookmaker. In just three months he must learn to lay odds and master the mysterious art of tick-tack. Chris seeks advice on how to spot a winner from top trainer Henry Cecil and jockey Willie Carson. He also consults television racing experts Peter O'Sullevan and John McCririck. On the day of his big race, all Chris knows for sure is that any one of the horses could win. He also knows that any mistake will cost his guv'nor a lot of money.
17	5	"Chef"	John Bird	10 June 1987
Reporter: Paul Heiney. Before Paul Heiney made this programme, his total culinary expertise equalled fish fingers grilled or fried. It is with this limited knowledge that he sets out to represent Michel Roux's Waterside Inn at Bray in a competition between four of Britain's top restaurants. For weeks Paul sweats onions and reduces sauces in the Waterside kitchens and spends a day working at London's exclusive Langan's Brasserie where the diners include Michael Caine. Chefs Nico Landenis, Raymond Blanc and the flamboyant Keith Floyd do their best to turn Paul into a master of nouvelle cuisine for the final contest.
18	6	"Press Photographer"	Nick Handel	17 June 1987
Reporter: Chris Serle. Chris is just an average amateur photographer. Will he convince a national newspaper that he has what it takes to be sent on a major picture assignment? For six weeks, Chris works alongside some of the top photographers in Fleet Street learning to capture the most dramatic moment of a news story or the sex appeal of a page three girl. He tries to follow the action of a rugby international and joins a scrum of rival photographers competing for a picture of Sarah Ferguson. 'You've got to be quicker, sharper, faster than all the people around you' warns former newspaper editor Derek Jameson as Chris prepares to do battle with 50 hardened professionals on a solo royal assignment for the Daily Mirror.
