= Murray Head discography =

- Studio albums: 12
- EPs: 1
- Soundtrack albums: 3
- Live albums: 3
- Compilation albums: 6
- Singles: 44
- Cast recording albums: 5

This is the discography of the English singer and actor Murray Head.

== Albums ==
=== Studio albums ===
Title	Album details	Peak chart positions	
Title	Album details	FRA	QUE
Nigel Lived	Released: 1972; Label: CBS, Columbia; Formats: LP	—	—
Say It Ain't So	Released: January 1976; Label: Island, A&M; Formats: LP, MC	—	—
Between Us	Released: March 1979; Label: Philips, Polydor; Formats: CD, LP, MC	10	—
Voices	Released: 1981; Label: Mercury, Polydor; Formats: CD, LP, MC	—	—
Shade	Released: October 1982; Label: Virgin, A&M; Formats: LP, MC	3	—
Restless	Released: May 1984; Label: Virgin, A&M; Formats: CD, LP, MC	—	—
Sooner or Later	Released: 1986; Label: Virgin, A&M; Formats: CD, LP, MC	—	—
Wave	Released: 1992; Label: XIII BIS; Formats: CD, MC; Released in Canada as Innocence	—	—
Pipe Dreams	Released: 1995; Label: Pomme Music; Formats: CD	—	—
Tête à tête	Released: 5 March 2007; Label: Odeon; Formats: CD	175	—
Rien n'est écrit	Released: 23 June 2008; Label: Sony BMG; Formats: CD	100	17
My Back Pages	Released: 29 October 2012; Label: Sony Music; Formats: CD, digital download	—	—
"—" denotes releases that did not chart or were not released in that territory.

=== Live albums ===
Title	Album details
Find the Crowd	Released: 1981; Label: Mercury; Formats: LP, MC
Live 2009 Volume 1	Released: 2009; Label: Vocation; Formats: CD
Say it ain’t So, Joe, Live!	Released: 2024; Label: Editions Murray Head Music; Formats: CD, vinyl

=== Soundtrack albums ===
Title	Album details
Cocktail Molotov	Released: 1980; Label: Philips; Formats: LP; With Yves Simon
The Flying Devils	Released: 1985; Label: Virgin; Formats: LP; With Kasper Winding
À gauche en sortant de l'ascenseur	Released: 1988; Label: Off the Track; Formats: CD, LP

=== Cast recording albums ===
Title	Album details	Peak chart positions								
Title	Album details	UK	AUS	AUT	BE (WA)	FRA	GER	NL	NOR	US
Jesus Christ Superstar	Released: 16 October 1970; Label: MCA; Formats: 2xLP, MC, 8-track; Concept cast recording for the rock opera of the same name	6	6	4	—	—	11	10	3	1
Dear Anyone...	Released: 30 June 1978; Label: DJM; Formats: LP, MC; Concept cast recording for the musical of the same name	—	—	—	—	—	—	—	—	—
Chess	Released: October 1984; Label: RCA; Formats: 2xCD, 2xLP, 2xMC; Concept cast recording for the musical of the same name	10	35	17	—	—	6	30	3	47
Time	Released: April 1986; Label: EMI; Formats: 2xLP, 2xMC; Concept album for the musical of the same name	21	56	—	—	—	—	—	—	—
Cindy (Cendrillon 2002)	Released: February 2002; Label: Pomme Music; Formats: CD, MC; Cast recording from the French musical of the same name	—	—	—	17	24	—	—	—	—
"—" denotes releases that did not chart or were not released in that territory.

=== Compilation albums ===
Title	Album details
How Many Ways	Released: May 1981; Label: Music Lovers; Formats: LP
Watching Ourselves Go By	Released: 1990; Label: Mercury; Formats: CD, LP, MC
When You're in Love	Released: 1995; Label: Pomme Music; Formats: CD, MC
Greatest Hits	Released: 2001; Label: Headcase; Formats: CD
Passion	Released: October 2002; Label: Justin Time; Formats: CD
Emotions – My Favourite Songs	Released: 14 February 2006; Label: EMI; Formats: CD
Scrapbook	Released: November 2010; Label: Éditions Murray Head Music; Formats: 3xCD+DVD

== EPs ==
Title	Album details
Pour 100 briques t'as plus rien !	Released: 1982; Label: Mercury; Formats: 7"; Soundtrack EP to the film of the same name

== Singles ==
Title	Year	Peak chart positions										Album
Title	Year	UK	AUS	BE (FL)	CAN	FRA	GER	NL	NZ	QUE	US	Album
"Alberta"	1965	—	—	—	—	—	—	—	—	—	—	Non-album singles
"The Bells of Rhymney"	1965	—	—	—	—	—	—	—	—	—	—	Non-album singles
"Someday Soon" (with the Blue Monks)	1967	—	—	—	—	—	—	—	—	—	—	Non-album singles
"She Was Perfection"	1967	—	—	—	—	—	—	—	—	—	—	Non-album singles
"Superstar" (with the Trinidad Singers)	1969	47	5	4	6	—	—	9	2	10	14	Jesus Christ Superstar
"Heaven on Their Minds" (US and Germany-only release)	1969	—	—	—	—	—	—	—	—	—	—	Jesus Christ Superstar
"Say It Ain't So Joe"	1975	—	—	—	—	—	—	—	—	—	—	Say It Ain't So
"Someone's Rocking My Dreamboat"	1976	52	—	—	—	—	—	—	—	—	—	Say It Ain't So
"Never Even Thought" (France-only release)	1976	—	—	—	—	—	—	—	—	—	—	Say It Ain't So
"Mademoiselle" (France and Spain-only release)	1978	—	—	—	—	—	—	—	—	—	—	Between Us
"Los Angeles" (France, Canada and Netherlands-only release)	1979	—	—	—	—	—	—	—	—	—	—	Between Us
"Sorry, I Love You" (Netherlands-only release)	1979	—	—	—	—	—	—	—	—	—	—	Between Us
"How Many Ways"	1979	—	—	—	—	—	—	—	—	—	—	Between Us
"Last Days of an Empire" (France-only release)	1980	—	—	—	—	—	—	—	—	—	—	Voices
"Cocktail Molotov" (with Yves Simon; France-only release)	1980	—	—	—	—	—	—	—	—	—	—	Cocktail Molotov
"Losing You" (France-only release)	1981	—	—	—	—	—	—	—	—	—	—	Find the Crowd
"Comme des enfants qui jouent" (France and Canada-only release)	1981	—	—	—	—	—	—	—	—	1	—	Non-album single
"Old Soho"	1981	—	—	—	—	—	—	—	—	—	—	Voices / How Many Ways
"No Mystery" (France-only release)	1982	—	—	—	—	—	—	—	—	—	—	Pour 100 briques t'as plus rien ! (EP)
"Corporation Corridors"	1982	—	—	—	—	—	—	—	—	—	—	Shade
"(All We Can Do Is) Hold On"	1983	—	—	—	—	—	—	—	—	—	—	Shade
"Maman"	1983	—	—	—	—	—	—	—	—	—	—	Shade
"When You're in Love"	1984	—	—	—	—	—	—	—	—	—	—	Restless
"Mario"	1984	—	—	—	—	—	—	—	—	—	—	Restless
"One Night in Bangkok"	1984	12	1	1	3	2	1	1	2	3	3	Chess
"Please Don't Leave Me Now" (with Kasper Winding; Germany-only release)	1985	—	—	—	—	—	—	—	—	—	—	The Flying Devils
"Pity the Child"	1985	—	—	—	—	—	—	—	—	—	—	Chess
"Picking Up the Pieces"	1985	—	—	—	—	—	—	—	—	—	—	Non-album singles
"Some People"	1986	148	—	—	—	—	—	—	—	—	—	Non-album singles
"In the Heart of You"	1987	—	—	—	—	—	—	—	—	—	—	Sooner or Later
"You Are" (France-only release)	1987	—	—	—	—	—	—	—	—	—	—	Sooner or Later
"Un été d'orages" (France-only release)	1989	—	—	—	—	—	—	—	—	—	—	Non-album single
"Move Closer" (France and Canada-only release)	1990	—	—	—	—	—	—	—	—	43	—	
"Little Bit of Loving" (France-only release)	1992	—	—	—	—	—	—	—	—	—	—	Wave
"Une femme un homme" (with Marie Carmen; France and Canada-only release)	1993	—	—	—	—	26	—	—	—	9	—	Innocence
"Who Loves You" (France-only release)	1995	—	—	—	—	—	—	—	—	—	—	Pipe Dreams
"India Song" (France promo-only release)	1995	—	—	—	—	—	—	—	—	—	—	Pipe Dreams
"Only a Pipe Dream" (France promo-only release)	1996	—	—	—	—	—	—	—	—	—	—	Pipe Dreams
"SOS World" (France promo-only release)	1996	—	—	—	—	—	—	—	—	—	—	Non-album singles
"Will You Still Love Me Tomorrow" (with Tricia Penrose; promo-only release)	2006	—	—	—	—	—	—	—	—	—	—	Non-album singles
"Make It Easy" (featuring Sophie Head; promo-only release)	2006	—	—	—	—	—	—	—	—	—	—	Non-album singles
"Rien n'est écrit"	2008	—	—	—	—	—	—	—	—	5	—	Rien n'est écrit
"Say It Ain't So Joe" (re-release)	2012	—	—	—	—	18	—	—	—	—	—	Say It Ain't So
"Dust in the Wind"	2012	—	—	—	—	—	—	—	—	—	—	My Back Pages
"—" denotes releases that did not chart or were not released in that territory.
