= The Family Way (disambiguation) =

The Family Way is a 1966 British comedy-drama film.

The Family Way may also refer to:

- The Family Way (novel), a 2013 novel from the Molly Murphy series
- The Family Way (soundtrack), a 1967 album that is the soundtrack to the 1966 film
- "The Family Way" (Doc Martin), a 2005 television episode
- "The Family Way" (My Hero), a 2003 television episode
- Family Way, a 2012 Dutch comedy film
- "A Family Way", a 2000 episode of Dawson's Creek
