= Find the Crowd =

Live album by Murray Head
- Released: 1981
- Genre: Rock
- Label: Mercury

Murray Head chronology
Voices (1981)	Find the Crowd (1981)	Shade (1983)

Find the Crowd is a live album by Murray Head recorded at three concerts in France. It was released in 1981.

== Track listing ==
All tracks composed by Murray Head; except where indicated

1. "Los Angeles"
2. "Losing You" (John Lennon)
3. "How Many Ways"
4. "Old Soho"
5. "Children Only Play"
6. "Last Daze of an Empire"
7. "Countryman"
8. "Never Even Thought"
9. "Say It Ain't So, Joe"
10. "Pity the Poor Consumer"

== Personnel ==
- Murray Head - vocals
- Phil Palmer - guitar
- Geoff Richardson - guitar, viola, clarinet
- Alan Spenner - bass guitar
- Peter Veitch - keyboards, accordion, violin
- Trevor Morais - drums
- Ginny Clee - percussion, vocals

Technical

- Phill Brown - engineer, mixing
- Ian Morais - second engineer
- Charles Littledale, Phil Palmer, Susan Ellis Jones - photography
