= Stop Me =

Compilation album by the Smiths
- Released: 21 January 1988
- Recorded: 1983–1987
- Genre: Alternative rock, indie pop
- Length: 28:29
- Label: RCA Victor
- Producer: Various (see main text)

The Smiths chronology
| Strangeways, Here We Come (1987) | Stop Me (1988) | Rank (1988) |

Stop Me is a Japanese exclusive compilation album by the English band the Smiths. It compiles the band's then-latest (but not last) three singles and their B-sides in reverse-chronological order. Stop Me was released in January 1988 by their Japanese record label, RCA Victor.

== Background ==
In 1987 the Smiths' UK record company, Rough Trade, planned to release three singles from the newly recorded Strangeways, Here We Come album. In August 1987 "Girlfriend in a Coma" was scheduled to be released as planned when news broke that the band had split up. This presented Rough Trade with a problem as no new material would be available to complement the other singles on their B-sides. It was decided to release the singles as planned, using archive material for B-sides. Singer Morrissey remained involved in the singles' sleeve design.

The second single off Strangeways, Here We Come was scheduled to be "Stop Me If You Think You've Heard This One Before", an up-tempo pop-rock song. The song contains the lines

I crashed down on the crossbar

And the pain was enough
To make a shy, bald Buddhist reflect

And plan a mass murder

Rough Trade deemed it unwise to release the song in the wake of the Hungerford massacre, fearing a BBC Radio ban. In the UK, "I Started Something I Couldn't Finish" was chosen instead, but other countries (United States, Canada, Australia, Netherlands) opted to keep "Stop Me If You Think You've Heard This One Before", releasing it in 7", 12" and CD single formats.

In Germany, the track was released as a double A-side with "Girlfriend in a Coma"; the 12" and CD versions featured the latter's original B-sides "Work Is a Four-Letter Word" and "I Keep Mine Hidden". The band's Japanese record company went one further and decided to compile their latest three singles, none of which had been released in Japan, and all of their B-sides onto a compilation album that bore an abbreviated version of the latest (international) single's title. By the time of the album's release, another single had been issued in the UK ("Last Night I Dreamt That Somebody Loved Me", December 1987), but it was not included.

=== Cover ===
The cover sleeve, designed as usual by Morrissey, features Murray Head in a still from the 1966 film The Family Way. The same design was used for the European and Australian 1987 single editions, but not for the contemporary UK single "I Started Something I Couldn't Finish", which had its own sleeve design (yet used the same B-sides as "Stop Me...").

== Track listing ==
All tracks are written by Morrissey and Johnny Marr, except when noted.

| No. | Title | Writer(s) | Length |
|---|---|---|---|
| 1. | "Stop Me If You Think You've Heard This One Before" | | 3:34 |
| 2. | "Pretty Girls Make Graves" (early version) | | 3:37 |
| 3. | "Some Girls Are Bigger Than Others" (live) | | 5:03 |
| 4. | "Girlfriend in a Coma" | | 2:04 |
| 5. | "Work Is a Four-Letter Word" | Guy Woolfenden, Don Black | 2:48 |
| 6. | "I Keep Mine Hidden" | | 1:59 |
| 7. | "Sheila Take a Bow" | | 2:41 |
| 8. | "Is It Really So Strange?" (John Peel session) | | 3:06 |
| 9. | "Sweet and Tender Hooligan" (John Peel session) | | 3:37 |
| Total length: | | | 28:29 |

== Personnel ==
- Morrissey – voice, whistling on "I Keep Mine Hidden"
- Johnny Marr – guitar, piano
- Andy Rourke – bass guitar
- Mike Joyce – drums, backing vocals on "Work Is a Four-Letter Word"

=== Additional musicians ===
- Audrey Riley – cello on "Pretty Girls Make Graves"
- Stephen Street – synthesized strings on "Girlfriend in a Coma"
- John Porter – slide guitar on "Sheila Take a Bow"

=== Production ===
- Johnny Marr, Morrissey and Stephen Street – producers (1, 4, 7-9)
- Troy Tate – producer (2)
- Grant Showbiz – producer (3, 5-6)
