= Say It Ain't So (disambiguation) =

"Say It Ain't So" is a 1994 song by Weezer.

Say It Ain't So may also refer to:

- Say It Ain't So (album), a 1975 album by Murray Head
- "Say It Ain't So", a 2003 song by the Thrills from So Much for the City
- "Say It Ain't So" (Degrassi), a 2012 television episode
- "Say It Ain't So" (Roseanne), a 1997 television episode

== See also ==
- Say It Ain't So, Joe (disambiguation)
- Say It Isn't So (disambiguation)
