= Miss Illusion =

Miss Illusion refers to:

- "Miss Illusion", a song by Bang Camaro from Bang Camaro II
- "Miss Illusion", a song by Murray Head from Nigel Lived
