= Phil Palmer =

English musician (born 1952)

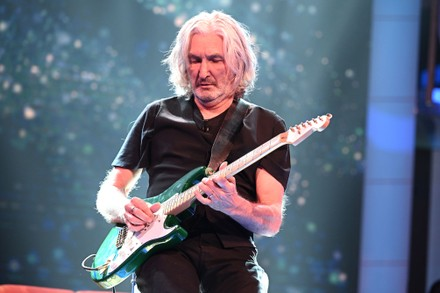
- Palmer performing on stage

Background information
- Born: Philip John Palmer; 9 September 1952 (age 74); London, England
- Genres: Rock; blues rock; jazz
- Occupations: Musician; songwriter; musical director
- Instruments: Guitar; vocals
- Years active: 1969–present
- Formerly of: Dire Straits
- Website: philpalmer.com

Philip John Palmer (born 9 September 1952) is an English rock musician and session guitarist who has toured, recorded, and worked with numerous artists. He is best known for his work with Eric Clapton and Dire Straits.

== Biography ==
Palmer grew up in north London. Ray and Dave Davies of The Kinks are his uncles on his mother's side.

He produced the 1996 album The View from the Hill, by Justin Hayward.

Palmer has supported artists that include Lucio Battisti (album Una giornata uggiosa, 1980), Pet Shop Boys, Murray Head, Steve Harley, Wishbone Ash (1986 touring), Joan Armatrading, Eric Clapton, Roger Daltrey, Iggy Pop, Scott Walker (Track Three, 1984) Paul Brady (touring, 1984), Thomas Anders (1989), Bob Dylan, Tina Turner, Dire Straits (1992 tour), Pete Townshend (1993 and 2000 shows), Eros Ramazzotti (Tutte storie 1993), Alejandro Sanz (Alejandro Sanz 3 1995), Paola e Chiara (1997), Pino Daniele, Geri Halliwell, Katey Sagal, Chris de Burgh, Bryan Adams, Johnny Hallyday, David Knopfler, George Michael, Ivano Fossati, Renato Zero, Claudio Baglioni, Massimo Di Cataldo, Melanie C, Robbie Williams, David Sylvian and Hajime Mizoguchi (album Angels, 2001). He often works with producer Trevor Horn. In 1986, he worked as a studio musician on Alphaville's album Afternoons in Utopia.

He co-wrote "I'm No Angel", recorded separately by Bill Medley and the Gregg Allman Band.

In 1993, Palmer assembled a band called Spin 1ne 2wo, with Paul Carrack (vocals and keyboards), Steve Ferrone (drums), Rupert Hine (producer, keyboards) and Tony Levin (bass). They released one album, a self-titled project, made up of classic rock covers including songs by Jimi Hendrix, The Who, Led Zeppelin, Blind Faith, Steely Dan and Bob Dylan.

Palmer performed with the numerous artists and was the musical director of The Strat Pack, at the 50th anniversary celebration of the Fender Stratocaster guitar which was held in 2004 at Wembley Arena in London. He performed in 2002 as a member of the backing band at the Queen's 50th anniversary rock concert at Buckingham Palace, "Party at the Palace".

As of 2021, he had appeared on over 500 albums and over 5000 songs.

In 2021, Palmer released an autobiography entitled Session Man.

== Personal life ==
He has named Davey Graham and Big Bill Broonzy as key influences on him while growing up.

Palmer and his wife are involved with UNICEF.

Palmer has two children from his first marriage - Oliver and Charlie.

== Appearances ==
With Bryan Adams

- 18 til I Die (A&M Records, 1996)

With Alphaville

- Afternoons in Utopia (Atlantic Records, 1986)

With Thomas Anders

- Different (Teldec, 1989)

With Tasmin Archer

- Great Expectations (Capitol Records, 1992)

With Joan Armatrading

- To the Limit (A&M Records, 1978)
- The Shouting Stage (A&M Records, 1988)

With Gary Barlow

- Open Road (RCA Records, 1997)
- Twelve Months, Eleven Days (RCA Records, 1999)

With Blue Zone

- Big Thing (Arista Records, 1988)

With Pet Shop Boys

- Fundamental (Parlophone, 2006)

With Sam Brown

- Stop! (A&M Records, 1988)

With Melanie C

- Reason (Virgin Records, 2003)

With Ray Charles

- Strong Love Affair (Warner Bros. Records, 1996)

With Eric Clapton

- Journeyman (Reprise Records, 1989)

With Clark Datchler

- Raindance (Virgin Records, 1990)

With Franco De Vita

- Fuera de Este Mundo (Columbia Records, 1996)

With Jim Diamond

- Desire for Freedom (A&M Records, 1986)
- Jim Diamond (Teldec, 1988)

With Céline Dion

- Unison (Columbia Records, 1990)

With Dire Straits

- On Every Street (Vertigo Records, 1991)

With Sheena Easton

- Take My Time (EMI, 1981)
- You Could Have Been with Me (EMI, 1981)
- Madness, Money & Music (EMI, 1982)
- My Cherie (MCA Records, 1995)

With David Essex

- Gold & Ivory (CBS Records, 1977)
- Imperial Wizard (Mercury Records, 1979)
- Hot Love (Mercury Records, 1980)
- Silver Dream Racer (Mercury Records, 1980)
- Stage - Struck (Mercury Records, 1982)
- This One's for You (Mercury Records, 1984)

With Delta Goodrem

- Mistaken Identity (Epic Records, 2004)

With Geri Halliwell

- Passion (EMI, 2005)

With Steve Harley

- The Candidate (EMI, 1979)

With Johnny Hates Jazz

- Tall Stories (Virgin Records, 1991)

With Murray Head

- Shade (Mercury Records, 1983)
- Restless (Virgin Records, 1984)
- Sooner or Later (Virgin Records, 1987)
- Pipe Dreams (Voiceprint Records, 1995)
- Rien n'est écrit (Sony, 2009)

With Trevor Horn

- Echoes: Ancient & Modern (Deutsche Grammophon, 2023)

With John Illsley

- Never Told a Soul (Vertigo Records, 1984)
- Glass (Vertigo Records, 1988)
- Long Shadows (Blue Barge Records, 2016)

With Duncan James

- Future Past (Innocent Records, 2006)

With Howard Jones

- One to One (Elektra Records, 1986)
- Cross That Line (Elektra Records, 1989)

With Juanes

- P.A.R.C.E. (Universal Music, 2010)

With Ronan Keating

- Songs from Home (Decca Records, 2021)

With Nick Lachey

- SoulO (Universal, 2003)

With Lulu

- Together (Mercury Records, 2002)

With George Michael

- Listen Without Prejudice Vol. 1 (Columbia Records, 1990)
- Songs from the Last Century (Virgin Records, 1999)
- Patience (Epic Records, 2004)

With Olly Murs

- Olly Murs (Epic Records, 2010)

With Jimmy Nail

- Crocodile Shoes (East West Records, 1994)
- Crocodile Shoes II (East West Records, 1996)

With The Overtones

- Higher (Warner Bros. Records, 2012)

With Iggy Pop

- The Idiot (RCA Records, 1977)

With Cliff Richard

- Cliff at Christmas (EMI, 2003)

With Andrew Ridgeley

- Son of Albert (Columbia Records, 1990)

With Jennifer Rush

- Credo (EMI, 1997)

With Katey Sagal

- Well... (Virgin Records, 1994)

With Seal

- Soul 2 (Reprise Records, 2011)
- 7 (Warner Bros. Records, 2015)

With Skin

- Fleshwounds (EMI, 2003)

With Lisa Stansfield

- The Moment (Edel, 2004)

With Amii Stewart

- Time for Fantasy (RCA Victor, 1988)

With David Sylvian

- Brilliant Trees (Virgin Records, 1984)
- Gone to Earth (Virgin Records, 1986)
- Secrets of the Beehive (Virgin Records, 1987)

With Take That

- Nobody Else (RCA Records, 1995)

With Tears For Fears

- The Hurting (Mercury Records, 1983)

With Tina Turner

- Foreign Affair (Capitol Records, 1989)
- Twenty Four Seven (Parlophone Records, 1999)

With Judie Tzuke

- Left Hand Talking (Columbia Records, 1991)

With Robbie Williams

- Sing When You're Winning (Chrysalis Records, 2000)
- Escapology (EMI, 2002)
- Reality Killed the Video Star (Virgin Records, 2009)
