= Last Night I Dreamt That Somebody Loved Me =

Single by the Smiths

from the album Strangeways, Here We Come
- B-side: "Rusholme Ruffians"; "Nowhere Fast"
- Released: 7 December 1987
- Recorded: Spring 1987
- Studio: The Wool Hall, Beckington, Somerset
- Genre: Alternative rock
- Length: 5:02 (album version); 3:12 (single edit)
- Label: Rough Trade
- Composer: Johnny Marr
- Lyricist: Morrissey
- Producers: Morrissey, Johnny Marr, Stephen Street

The Smiths singles chronology
"I Started Something I Couldn't Finish" (1987)	"Last Night I Dreamt That Somebody Loved Me" (1987)	"There Is a Light That Never Goes Out" (1992)

Professional ratings
Review scores
Source	Rating
AllMusic	2.5/5 stars

"Last Night I Dreamt That Somebody Loved Me" is a song by the English rock band the Smiths, written by singer Morrissey and guitarist Johnny Marr. It appears as the sixth track on the band's final album Strangeways, Here We Come (1987). It features a backdrop of crowd noises from the miners' strike of 1984–85. The song is a favourite of both Morrissey and Marr.

The song was released as the third and final UK single from Strangeways in December 1987. Billed as "the Last Single", as the band had already broken up, it reached number 30 in the UK Singles Chart.

Despite its commercial underachievement, "Last Night I Dreamt That Somebody Loved Me" has seen critical acclaim for Marr's guitar work and Morrissey's sombre lyricism. It has since appeared on multiple compilation albums and has been ranked by music writers as one of the band's best songs.

== Background ==
Guitarist Johnny Marr wrote the chord sequence for "Last Night I Dreamt That Somebody Loved Me" after a Smiths concert in October 1986 in Carlisle. The piano intro was composed separately. Marr later explained:

It's built around the guitar riff going round and round, the heart of it is the guitar riff but I orchestrated it using a keyboard and string sound. What I love about it is the drama in it – the drama sums up how I was feeling at the time. That song got written because at the core of it is a very melancholic and dramatic guitar riff that goes round and round and round. And first and foremost, amongst other particularly melancholic things in the Smiths, I hear myself in that. There's a side of myself, an introspective side, and probably melancholic side, that comes out because I'm a musician. Then I just blew that up musically with a superb performance by the rest of the group, and great composition by Morrissey.

The album version contains a one-minute and 55-second introduction, consisting of piano playing against a backdrop of crowd noises from the miners' strike of 1984–85. The 7-inch single release does not include the introduction, while the 12-inch single does. Both Morrissey and Johnny Marr, the co-writers, have nominated it as the best Smiths song.

Marr has called the song "the best thing we'd done" and "my favourite track at the time and probably still is." In a 1993 interview, Marr commented, "Strangeways has its moments, like 'Last Night I Dreamt That Somebody Loved Me'. Last time I met Morrissey he said it was his favourite Smiths song. He might be right."

== Release ==
"Last Night I Dreamt That Somebody Loved Me" was released as the final single from the band's 1987 album Strangeways, Here We Come. As the band had disbanded prior to the release of Strangeways, the release was billed on posters as "the Last Single". Ultimately, the single peaked at number 30 in the UK, continuing the underwhelming chart positioning of its predecessor, "I Started Something I Couldn't Finish".

Morrissey later reflected on the commercial shortcomings of the final two Strangeways singles:

I approved [of the singles' being released] in the sense that I believe Smiths records should be heard. "Last Night I Dreamt That Somebody Loved Me" and "I Started Something I Couldn't Finish" were great songs but, quite obviously, there weren't acceptable B-sides and quite obviously there was no acceptable reason for a CD and cassette single, but they occurred nonetheless. It's difficult because I wanted those songs to be heard, the death of the Smiths was far too convenient. If there was a last opportunity to invade and infest the airwaves I thought it should be done.

== Artwork and matrix message ==
The cover of the single featured a photograph of the 1950s and 1960s-era British singer Billy Fury.

The British 7-inch and 12-inch vinyl releases contained the matrix message: "THE RETURN OF THE SUBMISSIVE SOCIETY" (X) STARRING SHERIDAN WHITESIDE / "THE BIZARRE ORIENTAL VIBRATING PALM DEATH" (X) STARRING SHERIDAN WHITESIDE. Sheridan Whiteside was one of Morrissey's pseudonyms, taken from the protagonist of the play The Man Who Came to Dinner; that character was in turn based on dramatic critic and raconteur Alexander Woollcott and had been referenced in the etchings of the single "I Started Something I Couldn't Finish".

Morrissey initially sought to etch "Eaten by Vince Eager" on the vinyl single, but changed his mind after being warned of potential blowback.

== Critical reception ==
"Last Night I Dreamt That Somebody Loved Me" saw critical acclaim from its release. Reviewing Strangeways, Here We Come in 1987, the NME named it one of the two songs on the album amongst "Morrissey/Marr's greatest moments since the Fab Four's inception" (the other being "I Won't Share You"), writing, "it's as great as 'I Know It's Over'." Smash Hits wrote at the time, "If you fail to be moved by songs like 'Last Night I Dreamt That Somebody Loved Me', then you're missing out on a beautiful experience."

Rolling Stone ranked the song as the 23rd best Smiths song, stating, "Playing this song together, the Smiths all sound intimately in sync." NME named it the band's 19th best. Consequence ranked the song as the band's 18th best, noting that the song has "one of The Smiths' most explicitly hopeless choruses".

André 3000 of OutKast told MTV in 2003, "I personally wish I would have written that Smiths song, 'Last Night I Dreamt That Somebody Loved Me.' Genius song."

== Track listing ==
All tracks are written by Morrissey and Johnny Marr.

7-inch RT200
No.	Title	Length
1.	"Last Night I Dreamt That Somebody Loved Me" (single edit)	3:12
2.	"Rusholme Ruffians" (John Peel session version)	4:04

12-inch RTT200
No.	Title	Length
1.	"Last Night I Dreamt That Somebody Loved Me" (full-length version)	5:04
2.	"Rusholme Ruffians" (John Peel session version)	4:04
3.	"Nowhere Fast" (John Peel session version)	2:39

CD RTT200CD
No.	Title	Length
1.	"Last Night I Dreamt That Somebody Loved Me" (full-length version)	5:04
2.	"Rusholme Ruffians" (John Peel session version)	4:04
3.	"Nowhere Fast" (John Peel session version)	2:39
4.	"William, It Was Really Nothing" (John Peel session version)	2:04

== Charts ==
Chart	Peak position
Ireland (IRMA)	17
UK Singles (The Official Charts Company)	30

== Covers ==
Alternative band Low also covered the song, initially as a single, and later included it on their A Lifetime of Temporary Relief: 10 Years of B-Sides and Rarities. In the booklet, the band describes it as "another cover that some may sneer at. After this, nothing is sacred".

Eurythmics covered the song, as released on their 2005 album We Too Are One.
