= I Started Something I Couldn't Finish =

Single by the Smiths

from the album Strangeways, Here We Come
- B-side: "Pretty Girls Make Graves"; "Some Girls Are Bigger Than Others" (live)
- Released: 2 November 1987
- Recorded: March 1987
- Studio: The Wool Hall
- Genre: Alternative rock; glam rock
- Length: 3:47
- Label: Rough Trade
- Composer(s): Johnny Marr
- Lyricist(s): Morrissey
- Producer(s): Morrissey; Johnny Marr; Stephen Street

The Smiths singles chronology
| "Stop Me If You Think You've Heard This One Before" (1987) | "I Started Something I Couldn't Finish" (1987) | "Last Night I Dreamt That Somebody Loved Me" (1987) |

Professional ratings
Review scores
| Source | Rating |
|---|---|
| AllMusic | 2.5/5 stars |

"I Started Something I Couldn't Finish" is a song by the English rock band the Smiths, written by singer Morrissey and guitarist Johnny Marr and released on the group's 1987 album Strangeways, Here We Come. Featuring a glam rock-inspired guitar riff, the song emerged from a jam during the "Sheila Take a Bow" sessions.

Though not originally planned to be released as a single, "I Started Something I Couldn't Finish" was released as the album's second single after "Stop Me If You Think You've Heard This One Before" was banned by the BBC for references to mass murder after the Hungerford Massacre. Released in November 1987, it reached number 23 in the UK Singles Chart, a relative commercial underachievement. It was the first single released after the band had announced their split.

"I Started Something I Couldn't Finish" has seen critical acclaim for Marr's guitar work and Morrissey's witty lyricism. It has since appeared on multiple compilation albums.

== Background ==
"I Started Something I Couldn't Finish" began as part of a jam session played during the sessions for the band's single "Sheila Take a Bow". Marr recalled, "It was just a weird chord change that I had in my pocket for a while, and we needed a song so I pulled that out, just trying to get the key changes to work. I mean there was a lot of throwing stuff around with that album [Strangeways]." The song was inspired by David Bowie's "The Jean Genie" and Sparks' "Amateur Hour".

Marr explained, "I wanted the electric guitar parts a lot less layered and with a lot more weight, which you can hear on 'I Started Something I Couldn't Finish'." Marr composed the song's music on a 12-string Gibson ES-335, which he commented "gave a really big sound." The song also features a saxophone melody played on an Emulator, while co-producer Stephen Street added an electronic snare drum alongside Mike Joyce's drum line. Marr commented that the latter decision was to give his drumming "more texture."

Though Morrissey was critical of certain aspects of early versions of the song, Marr commented that "Morrissey was really into the song and he was sort of encouraging me" in contrast to Joyce and bassist Andy Rourke, who were not fond of the song. Marr pointed to Joyce and Rourke's opposition to the song as an additional incentive for him to leave the band.

The track features an outtake during the fade out, with Morrissey asking: "OK, Stephen, shall we do that again?"

== Release ==
Initially, the band's label Rough Trade intended to release "Stop Me If You Think You've Heard This One Before" as the second single from Strangeways, Here We Come. However, after the BBC banned the single in the aftermath of the Hungerford massacre (the lyrics contain a reference to "mass murder"), the band selected "I Started Something I Couldn't Finish" as the replacement A-side in the UK.

The B-sides included alternate and live recordings of previously released Smiths songs, alongside a cover of James' "What's the World." (Note: Morrissey on the James cover: "In another age, with a full living group, that would never have occurred. That was just a matter of trying to suspend 'I Started Something I Couldn't Finish' in the ... lower fifties.") The single reached number 23 in the UK, a relative underachievement commercially. Morrissey later reflected on the commercial shortcomings of the song and its follow-up, "Last Night I Dreamt That Somebody Loved Me":

I approved [of the singles being released] in the sense that I believe Smiths records should be heard. "Last Night I Dreamt That Somebody Loved Me" and "I Started Something I Couldn't Finish" were great songs but, quite obviously, there weren't acceptable B-sides and quite obviously there was no acceptable reason for a CD and cassette single, but they occurred nonetheless. It's difficult because I wanted those songs to be heard, the death of the Smiths was far too convenient. If there was a last opportunity to invade and infest the airwaves I thought it should be done.

"Stop Me If You Think You've Heard This One Before" was still released as a single in other countries, but its promotional video—which featured Morrissey plus a large number of Morrissey lookalikes—was used in the UK to promote "I Started Something I Couldn't Finish".

== Artwork and matrix message ==
The cover of the single features actress Avril Angers in a still from the 1966 film The Family Way.

The British 7-inch and 12-inch vinyls contain the etching: "MURDER AT THE WOOL HALL"(X)STARRING SHERIDAN WHITESIDE / YOU ARE BELIEVING, YOU DO NOT WANT TO SLEEP. The Wool Hall was the recording studio in Bath where the Smiths had recorded their last album Strangeways, Here We Come, but it also was where Morrissey, at the time of this single's release, was recording his first solo album Viva Hate. One of Morrissey's pseudonyms, Sheridan Whiteside, is the title role in the play The Man Who Came to Dinner. The B-side etching is a reversal of "You are sleeping, you do not want to believe", a sample heard at the end of the Smiths song "Rubber Ring".

== Critical reception ==
"I Started Something I Couldn't Finish" saw positive critical reception from its release. Reviewing Strangeways, Here We Come in 1987, the NME called it "a classic pop song that seems to echo―believe it or not―the treasured oeuvre of T. Rex, Mud, and the Glitter Band!"

Consequence ranked the song as the band's 25th best, writing, "The Smiths' music is riddled with indecision, and this song is Morrissey at his most doubtful." Rolling Stone ranked the song as the 42nd best Smiths song. A cover was released by Bow Wow Wow.

== Track listing ==
All tracks are written by Morrissey and Johnny Marr, except where noted.

7" RT198
| No. | Title | Length |
|---|---|---|
| 1. | "I Started Something I Couldn't Finish" | 3:46 |
| 2. | "Pretty Girls Make Graves" (Troy Tate version) | 3:35 |

12" RTT198
| No. | Title | Length |
|---|---|---|
| 1. | "I Started Something I Couldn't Finish" | 3:46 |
| 2. | "Pretty Girls Make Graves" (Troy Tate version) | 3:35 |
| 3. | "Some Girls Are Bigger Than Others" (live) | 5:03 |

Cassette RTT198C
| No. | Title | Length |
|---|---|---|
| 1. | "I Started Something I Couldn't Finish" | 3:46 |
| 2. | "Pretty Girls Make Graves" (Troy Tate version) | 3:35 |
| 3. | "Some Girls Are Bigger Than Others" (live) | 5:03 |
| 4. | "What's the World" (live) (James) | 2:05 |

== Charts ==
| Chart | Peak position |
|---|---|
| Ireland (IRMA) | 13 |
| UK Singles (The Official Charts Company) | 23 |
