= Say It Ain't So, Joe =

"Say it ain't so, Joe." is a phrase referencing baseball player Shoeless Joe Jackson and his involvement in the Black Sox Scandal.

It may also refer to:

- Say It Ain't So, Joe (opera), by Curtis K. Hughes, inspired by the 2008 United States vice-presidential debate
- "Say It Ain't So, Joe" (song), by Murray Head, 1975
- "Say it ain't so, Joe," a phrase used by former governor of Alaska Sarah Palin in the 2008 vice presidential debate against Joe Biden.

== See also ==
- Say It Ain't So (disambiguation)
- Say it isn't so (disambiguation)
