= Avril Angers =

English comedian and actress (1918–2005)

- Born: Florence Avril Angers; 18 April 1918; Liverpool, Lancashire, England
- Died: 9 November 2005 (aged 87); London, England
- Occupations: Actress, dancer

Florence Avril Angers (18 April 1918 – 9 November 2005) was an English stand-up comedian and actress. In 2005 The Daily Telegraph described her as "one of the most zestful, charming and reliable character comediennes in the postwar London theatre".

== Life ==
Angers was born in Liverpool, Lancashire in 1918. Her father, Harry Angers, was a music hall comedian who also appeared in films in the 1930s and 1940s. She was a dancer with the Tiller Girls before joining ENSA during the Second World War. She never married nor had children. Angers lived in Covent Garden, London, where she died from pneumonia, aged 87.

== Career ==
She joined dance troupes from the age of 14, before performing with ENSA and touring the Middle East and Africa during the Second World War. While performing in Cairo she was seen by BBC radio producer Douglas Moodie, who found her a place on radio broadcasts including Variety Bandbox and Carroll Levis' Discoveries. She made her West End theatre debut at the Palace Theatre in a 1944 revue titled Keep Going. Along with Terry-Thomas, she was one of the original cast of British television's first ever comedy series How Do You View? in 1949.

One of the early stand-up comediennes, she was capable of playing a straight man role as a foil to established male comics such as Frankie Howerd and Arthur Askey. She took on many and various roles in television (including Dad's Army, All Creatures Great and Small, Are You Being Served? and Odd Man Out), as well as in film and theatre. In 1961, she played Norah Dawson in Coronation Street, who was Arnold Tanner's new fiancée ('Madame Toffee Shop' as Elsie Tanner called her).

She played Miss Marple in Agatha Christie's Murder at the Vicarage at the Savoy Theatre in 1976 in the West End. One of her best remembered roles was that of Hayley Mills's shrewish mother in the film version of Bill Naughton's play The Family Way (1966). A still from the film featuring Angers features as the cover of The Smiths' single "I Started Something I Couldn't Finish" (1987). She played a leading role in Robin Hawdon's comedy, The Mating Game, at the Apollo Theatre in 1975, with Terry Scott and Clive Francis.

Biographer Robert Ross commented: "As ditzy, eccentric and beguiling as most of the characters she played, she seemed to breeze through life with an air or charming insanity... She was always ready with a steely gaze or a flirtatious smile..."

== Vocal work ==
In 1958, she, Roger Livesey, Terry-Thomas, Rita Webb, Judith Furse, and Miles Malleson, recorded 'Indian Summer of an Uncle', and 'Jeeves Takes Charge' for the Caedmon Audio record label, (Caedmon Audio TC-1137). It was released in stereo in 1964.

== Partial filmography ==
- Brass Monkey (1948) – Herself
- Miss Pilgrim's Progress (1949) – First Factory Girl
- The Six Men (1951) – Herself
- Don't Blame the Stork – Renee O'Connor
- Women Without Men (A.K.A. Blonde Bait) (1956) – Bessie
- Bond of Fear (1956) – Girl Hiker
- The Green Man (1956) – Marigold
- Coronation Street (1961) – Norah Dawson
- Be My Guest (1965) – Mrs Pucil
- Devils of Darkness (1965) – Midge
- The Family Way (1966) – Liz Piper
- Three Bites of the Apple (1967) – Gladys Tomlinson
- Two a Penny (1967) – Mrs Burry
- The Best House in London (1969) – Flora's Mother
- Staircase (1969) – Miss Ricard
- There's a Girl in My Soup (1970) – English Tourist in Lift
- Mr. Forbush and the Penguins (1971) – Fanny Hill
- Confessions of a Driving Instructor (1976) – Mrs Truscott
- Are You Being Served? - Season 7, Episode 4: "Mrs. Slocombe, Senior Person" (1979) - Edna Comlozi
- Victoria Wood – Episode 5: "Val de Ree (Ha Ha Ha Ha Ha)" (1989) – Mim
