= Madness, Money & Music =

Studio album by Sheena Easton
- Released: September 1982
- Studios: AIR Studios (Montserrat, West Indies)
- Genres: Pop, rock
- Length: 44.26 (UK); 38.31 (US)
- Label: EMI
- Producer: Christopher Neil

Sheena Easton chronology
You Could Have Been with Me (1981)	Madness, Money & Music (1982)	Best Kept Secret (1983)

Professional ratings
Review scores
Source	Rating
AllMusic	link

Madness, Money & Music is the third album by singer Sheena Easton. It was released in 1982 and produced by Christopher Neil. The album includes the singles "I Wouldn't Beg for Water" (US number 64) and "Machinery" (US number 57, UK number 38), as well as the UK single "Are You Man Enough" and Dutch hit "Ice Out In The Rain" (Holland number 21).

== Background ==
The album featured an early recording of the song "Wind Beneath My Wings", which would later be famously covered by Bette Midler amongst others. It also included the first recording of "You Do It", subsequently recorded by Diana Ross and Rita Coolidge, and a cover of Janis Ian's classic "In the Winter". The album was one of Easton's lower-charting efforts, reaching number 85 in the United States and number 44 in the UK, but was more successful in Scandinavia and went Gold in Canada. Despite its underpeformance, Easton promoted the album by way of an hour-long special Sheena Easton... Act One, produced for American television and syndicated worldwide, during which she performed several songs from the album (along with debuting "We've Got Tonight", a single she recorded with Kenny Rogers) and embarked on her first world tour. The special also featured a duet with Al Jarreau and a cameo appearance by Johnny Carson.

On 23 February 2013, British record label Edsel Records reissued the album together with You Could Have Been with Me in a two-disc package remastered with bonus tracks.

On 22 September 2023, the album was remastered and re-released as a two-disc Deluxe Edition by Cherry Red Records including five previously unreleased bonus tracks from the sessions and the first official DVD release of the Act One TV special and 3 promotional videos from the album.

== Track listing ==
=== UK version ===
Side One

1. "Weekend In Paris" (Sue Quinn) – 4:10
2. "Are You Man Enough" (Billy Livsey, Graham Lyle) – 3:28
3. "I Wouldn't Beg For Water" (Michael Leeson, Peter Vale) – 4:16
4. "Machinery" (Julia Downes) – 3:01
5. "Ice Out In The Rain" (Michael Leeson, Peter Vale) – 4:46
6. "I Don't Need Your Word" (Michael Leeson, Peter Vale) – 3:22

Side Two

1. "Madness Money and Music" (Barry Black, Brian Chatton) – 3:54
2. "There When I Needed You" (John Lewis Parker, Steve Kipner) – 3:01
3. "Wind Beneath My Wings" (Larry Henley, Jeff Silbar) – 4:04
4. "You Do It" (Deborah Allen, Eddie Struzick) – 3:41
5. "In The Winter" (Janis Ian) – 3:10
6. "Please Don't Sympathise" (Steve Thompson) – 3:33

=== US version ===
The US version of the album dropped two tracks ("I Don't Need Your Word" and "Please Don't Sympathise"), and reshuffled the track order.

Side One

1. "Machinery"
2. "Weekend In Paris"
3. "I Wouldn't Beg For Water"
4. "Are You Man Enough"
5. "Ice Out In The Rain"

Side Two

1. "Madness Money and Music"
2. "Wind Beneath My Wings"
3. "There When I Needed You"
4. "In The Winter"
5. "You Do It"

=== Edsel Records 2013 CD ===
The 2013 remastered reissue includes the full UK tracklist plus the following tracks:

1. "Some Of Us Will" (Phil Palmer) – 3:33
2. "Loner" (Peter Vale) – 2:38
3. "So We Say Goodbye" (Ian Lynn) – 2:06

=== Deluxe Edition ===
The 2023 2-disc remastered reissue includes the full UK tracklist plus the following tracks:

Disc 1 - CD

1. "Some Of Us Will" (Phil Palmer) – 3:33
2. "Loner" (Peter Vale) – 2:38
3. "Woman" (Sue Quinn) – 3:27
4. "The Lonely Stay Alone" (Rod Demick & Phil Palmer) – 2:53
5. "Weekend In Paris (Alternate Version)" – 3:48
6. "Madness, Money and Music (Alternate Version)" – 3:28
7. "Ice Out In The Rain (12" Remix)" – 6:42

Disc 2 - DVD

Act One - TV Special

1. "A Song For You"
2. "Feelings"
3. "For Your Eyes Only"
4. "He's A Rebel"
5. "Medley: Last Night At Danceland / Boogie Down / Roof Garden" – Duet with Al Jarreau
6. "We've Got Tonight"– Duet with Kenny Rogers
7. "The Entertainer"
8. "Out Here On My Own"
9. "Madness, Money And Music"
10. "Wind Beneath My Wings"

EMI Promotional Videos

1. "Machinery"
2. "Are You Man Enough"
3. "Ice Out In The Rain"

== Personnel ==
=== Musicians ===
- Sheena Easton – lead vocals, backing vocals
- Bias Boshell – acoustic piano
- Ian Lynn – synthesizers
- Micky Moody – guitars
- Phil Palmer – guitars
- Mo Foster – bass
- Peter Van Hooke – drums
- Frank Ricotti – percussion
- Tony Hall – saxophones
- Chris Hunter – saxophones
- Guy Barker – trumpets
- Alan Carvell – backing vocals
- John Kirby – backing vocals
- Christopher Neil – backing vocals

=== Production ===
- Christopher Neil – producer
- Nick Ryan – engineer
- Steve Rooke – mastering at Strawberry Mastering (London, England)
- Cream – design
- Roy R. Guzman – design
- Brian Aris – photography
- John Frieda – hair stylist
- Sue Mann – make-up
- D & J Arlon Enterprises Ltd. – management

== Charts ==
Chart performance for Madness, Money & Music
Chart (1982)	Peak position
Australian Albums (Kent Music Report)	94
Canada Top Albums/CDs (RPM)	73
Dutch Albums (Album Top 100)	47
Norwegian Albums (VG-lista)	5
Swedish Albums (Sverigetopplistan)	19
UK Albums (Official Charts)	44
US Billboard 200	85

Chart performance for Madness, Money & Music
Chart (2023)	Peak position
Scottish Albums (OCC)	46
