= Say It Isn't So =

Say It Isn't So may refer to:

- Say It Isn't So (film), a 2001 comedy film starring Chris Klein and Heather Graham
- "Say It Isn't So" (Irving Berlin song), a 1932 song written by Irving Berlin.
- "Say It Isn't So" (Hall & Oates song), a 1983 single by Hall & Oates
- "Say It Isn't So", a song released in 1985 as a single by the Outfield from their album Play Deep
- "Say It Isn't So" (Bon Jovi song), a 2000 single by Bon Jovi
- "Say It Isn't So" (Gareth Gates song), a 2003 single by Gareth Gates

== See also ==
- Say It Ain't So (disambiguation)
- Say It Ain't So, Joe (disambiguation)
