= Innocence (Murray Head album) =

Studio album by Murray Head
- Released: 1993
- Genre: Rock
- Label: Voiceprint Records

Murray Head chronology
| Wave (1992) | Innocence (1993) | When You're in Love (1995) |

Innocence is the ninth studio album by Murray Head. It was released in 1993.

== Track listing ==
1. "Nothing To Lose"
2. "Move Closer"
3. "Comme des enfants qui jouent"
4. "All Eyes Are on the West"
5. "Le temps passe"
6. "When You're In Love"
7. "Ocean"
8. "Innocence"
9. "Little Bit of Loving"
10. "Un homme, une femme"
11. "Make It Easy"
