= Stop Me If You Think You've Heard This One Before =

1987 single by the Smiths

Single by the Smiths

from the album Strangeways, Here We Come
- B-side: "I Keep Mine Hidden"
- Released: October 1987
- Genre: Alternative rock
- Length: 3:32
- Label: Sire (US)
- Composer: Johnny Marr
- Lyricist: Morrissey
- Producers: Stephen Street; Johnny Marr; Morrissey

The Smiths singles chronology
"Girlfriend in a Coma" (1987)	"Stop Me If You Think You've Heard This One Before" (1987)	"I Started Something I Couldn't Finish" (1987)

Music video
- "Stop Me If You Think You've Heard This One Before" on YouTube

"Stop Me If You Think You've Heard This One Before" is a song by the English rock band the Smiths, written by singer Morrissey and guitarist Johnny Marr. The song was first released on the group's 1987 album Strangeways, Here We Come. Marr's music features a larger sound, courtesy of a 12-string Gibson ES-335, and one of his few guitar solos with the Smiths. Morrissey's lyrics allude to alcohol and deception.

Although the song was originally planned to be released as a single in August 1987, the BBC objected to the song's lyrical reference to mass murder in the aftermath of the Hungerford massacre. As a result, "Stop Me If You Think You've Heard This One Before" was only released as a single in America, Australia, and some European markets that October, while "I Started Something I Couldn't Finish" was chosen to replace the song as the band's new UK single.

Despite not being heavily played by British radio at the time of its release, "Stop Me If You Think You've Heard This One Before" has seen critical acclaim for Marr's guitar work and Morrissey's witty lyricism. It has since appeared on multiple compilation albums and has been ranked by music writers as one of the band's best songs.

== Background ==
"Stop Me If You Think You've Heard This One Before" features, like most Smiths songs, lyrics written by Morrissey and music written by Johnny Marr. Marr composed the song's music on a 12-string Gibson ES-335, which he commented "gave a really big sound." (Note: Marr later gave this guitar to Suede guitarist Bernard Butler.) He explained that the guitar hits in the song's intro were the result of stacking a Telecaster "on top of a Fender Twin Reverb with the vibrato on, and tun[ing] it to an open chord" only to "drop a knife with a metal handle on it, hitting random strings." The song also featured the first guitar solo on a Smiths record; Marr explained in an interview with Guitar Player magazine:

"I was really pleased that the first solo as such on a Smiths record was one you could sing... I liked the melody at the end of 'Stop Me If You've Heard This One Before,' but it just felt a little too accomplished. I wanted it to sound like a punk player who couldn't play, so I fingered it on one string, right up and down the neck. I could have played it with harmonics or my teeth, or something clever, but the poignancy would have gone out of the melody."

Lyrically, Rolling Stone described the song as "a whirlwind tour of sex, lies, booze, obsession, mass murder, [and] bicycle-related testicular injury". Len Brown of the NME commented on an alternate meaning to the song's title, "[Morrissey] even seems to relish calling a song 'Stop Me If You've Heard This One Before,' in the face of those who perpetually take the piss out of him and reckon that every Smiths song sounds the same."

== Release ==
In addition to its release on Strangeways, Here We Come, "Stop Me If You Think You've Heard This One Before" was originally intended to be released as the album's second single. Promotional singles were printed and sent to Radio One. However, the song's single release came in the wake of the Hungerford massacre, in which 16 people were murdered, and the BBC refused to play the song on the grounds that the lyric "plan a mass murder" was offensive. As a result, the song was not released as a single in the UK and "I Started Something I Couldn't Finish" was selected instead. "Stop Me If You Think You've Heard This One Before" was ultimately released as a single in other regions, including the United States, Australia, Germany, and others. The cover of the single is a picture of British actor and singer Murray Head from a still of the 1966 film The Family Way (a movie that would also be the source of the photograph on the cover of "I Started Something I Couldn't Finish").

Morrissey later stated:

"I desperately, desperately wanted that to be released. Rough Trade sent white labels along to Radio One but they said they would never under any circumstances play it because of the line about mass murder. They said people would've instantly linked it with Hungerford and it would've caused thousands of shoppers to go out and buy machine guns and murder their grandparents. I think Rough Trade should've released 'Death of a Disco Dancer' just to be stroppy."

The song was later featured on the compilation albums Stop Me and The Very Best of The Smiths. The song is also included in the music video game Rock Band 3. Though the band broke up before they could tour any songs from Strangeways, Here We Come, Morrissey performed the song live alongside fellow ex-Smiths Andy Rourke, Mike Joyce, and Craig Gannon as the opening song of his infamous debut solo concert at Wolverhampton Civic Hall in December 1988.

== Music video ==
A music video was produced by the director Tim Broad. It opens with a picture of Oscar Wilde hanging on a brick wall, and features Morrissey and a group of Morrissey lookalikes cycling around Manchester and Salford, including famous locations such as the Salford Lads' Club. Morrissey was hesitant to take part in the videos, but was implored by Rough Trade's Geoff Travis to participate in order to boost the album's singles. Morrissey recalled in his autobiography, "Tim Broad steps in to make sense of it all, hotch-podging two videos for both 'Girlfriend in a Coma' and 'Stop Me If You Think You've Heard This One Before'. The results for both are frustratingly unwatchable, although Tim did his best with such a mealy-mouthed budget." (Note: Morrissey recalled Travis allocating a budget of twelve-thousand pounds for both videos.)

== Critical reception ==
"Stop Me If You Think You've Heard This One Before" has seen critical acclaim since its release. David Browne of Rolling Stone called the track "the album’s most propulsive number" and opined, "Marr's piercing solo at the end of the song not only is one of the record's emotional highlights — it also proves it's best the band split up rather than attempt to replace him." Stephen Thomas Erlewine of AllMusic called the song a "classic," while Douglas Wolk of Pitchfork commented, "Their final single couldn't have had a cleverer title than 'Stop Me if You Think You've Heard This One Before'."

Rolling Stone ranked the song as the 14th best Smiths song, while NME named it the band's 16th best. Consequence ranked the song as the band's 28th best, calling it "a testament to The Smiths' power in 1987". Guitar named the song as the band's 20th greatest guitar moment.

== Track listing ==
All tracks written by Morrissey and Johnny Marr.

12-inch and CD single (Germany, red cover)
No.	Title	Length
1.	"Stop Me If You Think You've Heard This One Before"	3:33
2.	"Work Is a Four-Letter Word"	2:47
3.	"Girlfriend in a Coma"	2:02
4.	"I Keep Mine Hidden"	1:57

12-inch (Netherlands, grey cover and Australia, orange cover)
No.	Title	Length
1.	"Stop Me If You Think You've Heard This One Before"	3:33
2.	"Pretty Girls Make Graves" (early cello version)	3:35
3.	"Some Girls Are Bigger Than Others" (live)	5:03

7-inch (Germany, red cover)
No.	Title	Length
1.	"Stop Me If You Think You've Heard This One Before"	3:33
2.	"Girlfriend in a Coma"	2:02

7-inch (Netherlands, grey cover and Australia, orange cover)
No.	Title	Length
1.	"Stop Me If You Think You've Heard This One Before"	3:33
2.	"Pretty Girls Make Graves" (early cello version)	3:35

7-inch (North America, blue cover)
No.	Title	Length
1.	"Stop Me If You Think You've Heard This One Before"	3:33
2.	"I Keep Mine Hidden"	1:57

== Charts ==
Chart (1987–1988)	Peak position
New Zealand (Recorded Music NZ)	31
Australia (ARIA)	91

== Mark Ronson version ==
"Stop Me"

Single by Mark Ronson featuring Daniel Merriweather

from the album Version
- B-side: "No One Knows"
- Released: 2 April 2007
- Genre: Orchestral pop; disco; soul
- Length: 3:54
- Label: Columbia
- Songwriters: Morrissey; Johnny Marr; Holland–Dozier–Holland
- Producer: Mark Ronson

Mark Ronson singles chronology
"Just" (2006)	"Stop Me" (2007)	"Oh My God" (2007)

Daniel Merriweather singles chronology
"Catch Phrase" (2006)	"Stop Me" (2007)	"Cash in My Pocket" (2008)

Music video
- "Stop Me" (International version) on YouTube

=== Background and release ===
In 2007, the song was recorded as "Stop Me" with additional lyrics from the song "You Keep Me Hangin' On" by the Supremes by British musician, DJ and producer Mark Ronson featuring Australian singer-songwriter and frequent collaborator Daniel Merriweather on vocals. Merriweather admitted in an interview with The Guardian that he was not very familiar with the original before he recorded Mark Ronson's revised version. He explained: "Mark said, 'I want you to sing on this – it's my favourite Smiths song,' so I listened to it. I'd heard it once before, but I was never a Smiths fan. But I thought it was beautiful." The song was later released as a single on 2 April 2007 on Columbia Records under the shortened title "Stop Me", and it was included on Ronson's studio album of cover versions Version. The single reached number two on the UK Singles Chart.

The music video, released at the same time as the song, was directed by Scott Lyon and features a man who finds a pair of trainers that control him and force him to run along the motorway near the Blackwall Tunnel. This version was released in the United Kingdom. The international version, directed by Matt Lenski, showed people crying animated tears.

The song featured prominently in the opening scenes of the premiere of the second half of Nip/Tuck's fifth season. The song also featured on the 2013 showreel for Seattle-based b-boy crew, Art of Movement, uploaded by Korean-American singer and member of the crew, Jay Park.

=== Critical reception ===
"Stop Me" gained considerable praise and reference, as well as controversy from loyal Smiths fans despite its chart success being the highest UK chart position for a Smiths song. The music review site ThisisfakeDIY gave the single a 5-star rating, citing that its popularity stemmed from its abstraction from a typical Smiths song, resembling a "sweeping, orchestral pop song with horns to boot … soulful, evocative vocals ... a stirring mix". This song was number 80 on Rolling Stone's list of the 100 Best Songs of 2007. The cover received a mixed review from musicOMH reviewer Jenny Cole, who remarked that the notion of "discoing up a Smiths track" was a "travesty", and queried that "Morrissey would no doubt hate the idea of someone who has previously worked with Christina Aguilera and Robbie Williams" re-composing his songs. However, the reviewer remarked that despite its composition "in a mad way it works … Electronic, cheery and danceable, it's really not half bad" but that the addition of the Supremes to the song was "just mad".

=== Other versions ===
A slightly shorter edited version (where the lyrics start at the first verse) was released to mainstream radio in October 2007. A remix by Kissy Sell Out features on Ministry of Sound 2008 compilation The Annual. Trance DJ Paul Oakenfold also remixed the song exclusively for his 2007 compilation album Greatest Hits & Remixes. Live versions by Mark Ronson and/or Stu Zender featuring Merriweather have appeared on Late Night with Conan O'Brien (in July 2007), BBC Radio 1 and Jimmy Kimmel Live! After the win and performance of Ronson at the 2008 edition of the Brit Awards, "Stop Me" climbed as high as number 31 on the iTunes Top 100 and re-entered the UK Top 75 Singles chart at number 51.

=== Track listings ===
- CD maxi single
1. "Stop Me" - 3:54
2. "Stop Me" (A Chicken Lips Malfunction) - 7:05
3. "Stop Me" (Dirty South remix) - 8:24
4. "No One Knows" - 4:40
- CD single
1. "Stop Me"
2. "No One Knows"
- 10" vinyl
1. "Stop Me"
2. "No One Knows"

=== Charts ===
==== Weekly charts ====
Chart (2007)	Peak position
Australia (ARIA)	64
Europe (Eurochart Hot 100)	11
Germany (GfK)	65
Italy (FIMI)	23
Scottish Singles Sales (Official Charts)	14
Switzerland (Schweizer Hitparade)	11
UK Singles (Official Charts)	2
UK Dance (Official Charts)	1
US Dance Club Songs (Billboard)	44
US Dance Airplay (Billboard)	4

==== Year-end charts ====
Chart (2007)	Position
UK Singles (OCC)	38

=== Certifications ===
Region	Certification	Certified units/sales
United Kingdom (BPI)	Silver	200,000^{^}
^{^} Shipments figures based on certification alone.
