= George Martin Instrumentally Salutes "The Beatle Girls" =

Studio album by George Martin & His Orchestra
- Released: 28 November 1966
- Recorded: 1966
- Studio: EMI, London
- Genre: Easy listening
- Label: United Artists
- Producer: George Martin

George Martin & His Orchestra chronology
Help! (1965)	George Martin Instrumentally Salutes "The Beatle Girls" (1966)	The Family Way (1967)

Professional ratings
Review scores
Source	Rating
AllMusic	2.5/5 stars

George Martin Instrumentally Salutes "The Beatle Girls" is a 1966 album by George Martin & His Orchestra. It is the third in a series of albums by Martin, the Beatles' producer at the time, that consist of instrumental arrangements of Beatles songs. It was released by United Artists Records on 28 November 1966 in the United States, with the United Kingdom release following on 3 March 1967.

Martin recorded the album following the sessions for the Beatles' 1966 LP Revolver. The album is themed around Beatles songs that are titled after or refer to young women, although some of the tracks depart from this concept. Author Robert Rodriguez comments that the inclusion of "Yellow Submarine" "remains unexplained" and the record's title is challenged further by the presence of vocals on "Eleanor Rigby". The album was issued on CD in 1994 by One Way Records.

== Track listing ==
All songs by John Lennon and Paul McCartney, except where noted.

Side one

1. "Girl" – 2:39
2. "Eleanor Rigby" – 2:14
3. "She Said, She Said" – 2:49
4. "I'm Only Sleeping" – 2:45
5. "Anna (Go to Him)" (Arthur Alexander) – 3:09
6. "Michelle" – 2:56

Side two

1. "Got to Get You into My Life" – 2:10
2. "Woman" (McCartney under the pseudonym of "Bernard Webb") – 2:15
3. "Yellow Submarine" – 2:44
4. "Here, There and Everywhere" – 2:11
5. "And Your Bird Can Sing" – 2:09
6. "Good Day Sunshine" – 2:07
