= You Could Have Been with Me =

1981 album by Sheena Easton

Studio album by Sheena Easton
- Released: 21 September 1981
- Recorded: 1981
- Studio: Caribou Ranch (Nederland, Colorado)
- Genre: Pop rock
- Length: 35:05
- Label: EMI
- Producer: Christopher Neil

Sheena Easton chronology
Take My Time (1981)	You Could Have Been with Me (1981)	Madness, Money & Music (1982)

Singles from You Could Have Been with Me
- 1. "Just Another Broken Heart" Released: 1 September 1981; 2. "You Could Have Been with Me" Released: November 1981; 3. "A Little Tenderness" Released: 1982 (EU)

Professional ratings
Review scores
Source	Rating
AllMusic	2.5/5 stars
Record Mirror	3.5/5 stars
Smash Hits	5/10

You Could Have Been with Me is the second studio album by the Scottish singer Sheena Easton. It was released on 21 September 1981 by EMI.

== Background ==
The album reached number 33 on the UK Albums Chart and has been certified silver by the British Phonographic Industry (BPI). In the United States, it peaked at number 47 on the Billboard 200 and was eventually certified gold by the Recording Industry Association of America (RIAA). The title track was the best-performing single from the album, reaching number 15 on the US Billboard Hot 100 and number 54 on the UK Singles Chart. In the United Kingdom, the lead single, "Just Another Broken Heart", peaked at number 33, while third single "A Little Tenderness" failed to chart in early 1982. In the US, a track from her first album was included, "When He Shines", which was released as a single and peaked at number 30.

You Could Have Been With Me became a top-10 album in Japan, following the use of the track "A Little Tenderness" in a television advertising campaign for Noevir Cosmetics. The album also reached number two in Sweden and number seven in Norway.

A CD reissue in 2000 added the track "For Your Eyes Only" (number four in the US and number eight in the UK), one of Easton's most successful singles.

On 23 February 2013, British record label Edsel Records reissued the album together with Madness, Money & Music in a two-disc package remastered with bonus tracks. Here the album retains the UK running order but adds “When He Shines” as an eleventh track before the bonus tracks proper.

On 24 November 2014, the album was included in an Original Album Series box set in the UK with all of her first five albums with EMI through Warner Music Group.

== Track listing ==
Side one
No.	Title	Writer(s)	Length
1.	"A Little Tenderness"	Mick Leeson; Peter Vale	3:44
2.	"Savoir Faire"	Phil Palmer; Peter Vale	3:10
3.	"Just Another Broken Heart"	Mick Leeson; Peter Vale	3:29
4.	"I'm Not Worth the Hurt"	Rafe Van Hoy; Deborah Allen; Eddie Struzick	3:00
5.	"You Could Have Been with Me"	Lea Maalfrid	3:48
Total length:			35:05

Side two
No.	Title	Writer(s)	Length
6.	"A Letter from Joey"	Dominic Bugatti; Frank Musker	3:44
7.	"Telephone Lines"	Steve Kipner; Chris Christian	3:22
8.	"Johnny"	Donovan McKitty	3:33
9.	"Trouble in the Shadows"	Lea Maalfrid	3:12
10.	"Isn't It So"	Kathleen Floyd	2:50

=== US and Canadian edition ===
North American editions of the album replaced "Isn't It So" with "When He Shines", and switched the order of tracks 2 and 5 ("You Could Have Been with Me" and "Savoir Faire".)

On the 2013 CD, though not on the original UK release “When He Shines” is listed as track 11 of the album, not as a bonus track.

Side one
No.	Title	Writer(s)	Length
1.	"A Little Tenderness"	Mick Leeson; Peter Vale	3:44
2.	"You Could Have Been with Me"	Lea Maalfrid	3:48
3.	"Just Another Broken Heart"	Mick Leeson; Peter Vale	3:29
4.	"I'm Not Worth the Hurt"	Rafe Van Hoy; Deborah Allen; Eddie Struzick	3:00
5.	"Savoir Faire"	Phil Palmer; Peter Vale	3:10
Total length:			36:10

Side two
No.	Title	Writer(s)	Length
6.	"A Letter from Joey"	Dominic Bugatti; Frank Musker	3:44
7.	"Telephone Lines"	Steve Kipner; Chris Christian	3:22
8.	"Johnny"	Donovan McKitty	3:33
9.	"Trouble in the Shadows"	Lea Maalfrid	3:12
10.	"When He Shines"	Frank Bugatti; Florrie Palmer	3:52

2000 CD reissue bonus tracks
No.	Title	Writer(s)	Length
11.	"Isn't It So"	Kathleen Floyd	2:51
12.	"For Your Eyes Only"	Bill Conti; Mick Leeson	3:00
13.	"No One Ever Knows"	Mick Leeson; Peter Vale	3:51

Edsel Records 2013 CD bonus tracks
No.	Title	Writer(s)	Length
11.	"When He Shines"	Dominic Bugatti; Florrie Palmer	3:55
12.	"For Your Eyes Only"	Bill Conti; Mick Leeson	3:00
13.	"No One Ever Knows"	Mick Leeson; Peter Vale	3:46
14.	"Family Of One"	Mick Leeson; Peter Vale	2:51
15.	"Right Or Wrong"	Phil Palmer	3:12

== Personnel ==
Credits adapted from the liner notes of You Could Have Been with Me.

=== Musicians ===
- Sheena Easton – vocals
- Ian Lynn – keyboards, synthesizers, string arrangements (10)
- Phil Palmer – guitars
- Andy Brown – bass
- Peter Van Hooke – drums
- Frank Ricotti – percussion
- Alan Carvell – backing vocals
- Christopher Neil – backing vocals
- Tony Rivers – backing vocals

=== Technical ===
- Nick Ryan – engineering
- Greg Edward – engineering assistance
- Christopher Neil – production

=== Artwork ===
- Brian Aris – photography
- Cream – sleeve design
- Sue Mann – make-up
- Nikki – hair stylist
- D & J Arlon Enterprises, Ltd. – management

== Charts ==
=== Weekly charts ===
Chart (1981–82)	Peak position
Canada Top Albums/CDs (RPM)	35
Dutch Albums (Album Top 100)	22
Finnish Albums (Suomen virallinen lista)	12
German Albums (Offizielle Top 100)	52
Japanese Albums (Oricon)	7
Norwegian Albums (VG-lista)	7
Swedish Albums (Sverigetopplistan)	2
UK Albums (Official Charts)	33
US Billboard 200	47

=== Year-end charts ===
Chart (1982)	Position
US Billboard 200	53

== Certifications ==
Certifications for You Could Have Been with Me
Region	Certification	Certified units/sales
Canada (Music Canada)	Platinum	100,000^{^}
United Kingdom (BPI)	Silver	60,000^{^}
United States (RIAA)	Gold	500,000^{^}
^{^} Shipments figures based on certification alone.
