= Voices (Murray Head album) =

Studio album by Murray Head
- Released: 1981
- Studios: Morgan Studios, London; Ridge Farm Studios, Dorking
- Genre: Rock
- Label: Pomme Records
- Producers: Paul Samwell-Smith, Robert Ash

Murray Head chronology
Between Us (1979)	Voices (1981)	Find the Crowd (1981)

Professional ratings
Review scores
Source	Rating
Allmusic	4/5 stars

Voices is the fourth studio album by Murray Head. It was released in 1981. Many musicians from Fairport Convention are featured here, Richard Thompson, Simon Nicol, Dave Pegg and Dave Mattacks. Cat Stevens' guitarist Alun Davies is also playing on the album, as well as Bob Weston and Jeff Beck.

== Track listing ==
All tracks composed by Murray Head

1. "Last Daze of an Empire" - 4:17
2. "Affair Across a Crowded Room" - 4:37
3. "Hey Lady" - 3:05
4. "On your Own Again" - 3:45
5. "She's Doing Time on the Line" - 4:00
6. "Chance Encounter" - 3:37
7. "Children Only Play (Do You Remember?)" - 4:46
8. "Old Soho" - 4:05
9. "A Tree" - 4:01
10. "Going Home" - 3:38
11. "Los Angeles" - 4:50
12. "How Many Ways" - 4:24
13. "Never Even Thought" - 5:31

== Personnel ==
- Murray Head - vocals, acoustic guitar
- Jeff Beck - guitar
- Richard Thompson - guitar
- Simon Nicol - guitar
- Geoffrey Richardson - acoustic guitar
- Bob Weston - acoustic guitar
- Alun Davies - acoustic guitar, background vocals, vibraphone
- Paul Whittaker - guitar
- Gary Taylor - acoustic guitar, bass guitar
- Dave Pegg - bass guitar, mandolin
- Pat Donaldson - bass guitar
- Simon Jeffes - bass guitar
- Bruce Lynch - double bass
- Rupert Hine - harmonica, piano
- Peter Veitch - organ, Roland synthesizer, violin, accordion, Fender Rhodes, barrel organ
- Jeff Allen - drums
- Stephanie Spring - drums
- Steve Fletcher - drums, percussion, keyboards, background vocals
- Dave Mattacks - drums, percussion
- Trevor Morais - drums
- Andy Newmark - drums
- Morris Pert - percussion
- Dyan Birch - vocals
- Anthony Stewart Head - choir, chorus
- Paul Samwell-Smith - vibraphone
- Christopher Warren-Green - violin, cello
- Nigel Warren-Green - violin, cello
- Norman Zulu - choir, chorus
- Clifton Davis - choir, chorus
- Sue Lynch - voices
- Chris Mercer - saxophone
- Nicola Kerr - girls voice on "Children Only Play (Do You Remember?)"

Technical

- Mike Bobak, Robert Ash - engineer
- Michael Ross - design, photography
