= You Could Have Been with Me (song) =

"You Could Have Been With Me"

Single by Sheena Easton

from the album You Could Have Been with Me
- B-side: "Family of One" (UK); "Savoir Faire" (US)
- Released: November 1981
- Genre: Pop
- Length: 3:48
- Label: EMI Records (original), RT Industries (current)
- Songwriter: Lea Maalfrid
- Producer: Christopher Neil

Sheena Easton singles chronology
"Just Another Broken Heart" (1981)	"You Could Have Been With Me" (1981)	"A Little Tenderness" (1982)

"You Could Have Been with Me" is a 1981 single by Sheena Easton from her album of the same name. The single reached number 15 on the Billboard Hot 100, while its Adult Contemporary peak was number 6.

== Background ==
The song was composed by Lea Maalfrid who had considerable success in her native land New Zealand as frontwoman for the mid-70s acid glam rock band Ragnarok. Maalfrid came to London at the behest of Elton John with whom she'd toured Australia. After plans for Maalfrid to record for John's label, The Rocket Record Company, fell through, she shopped her demos - including that for "You Could Have Been with Me" - and caught the interest of producer Christopher Neil, although his involvement with Easton meant postponing his recording with Maalfrid. Eventually Neil had Easton cut two of Maalfrid's songs: "You Could Have Been with Me" and "Trouble in the Shadows". Maalfrid had little awareness of Easton and "wasn't too bothered" of Easton recording her songs as she confided to a record company receptionist who responded, "You will be when you get the money". Soon afterwards Maalfrid abandoned her own singing career in favor of songwriting.

"You Could Have Been with Me" peaked at #15 (#12 in Cash Box) the week of the 1982 Grammy Awards broadcast (February 25) on which Easton received the Best New Artist Award. After the follow-up "When He Shines" peaked at #30 Easton would be absent from the Top 40 until the end of January 1983 when she and Kenny Rogers would release the duet "We've Got Tonight," which reached #6.

"You Could Have Been with Me" had little chart impact in the UK (#54), evincing that Easton's career prospects were stronger in the U.S. than in her native land. "You Could Have Been with Me" also charted in Canada (#13), the Netherlands (#14), Belgium (#23) and Japan (#46 with sales of 48,000).

== Track listing ==
UK

1. You Could Have Been with Me" (Lea Maalfrid)
2. "Family of One" (Mick Leeson, Peter Vale)

US

1. "You Could Have Been with Me" (Lea Maalfrid)
2. "Savoir Faire (He's Got)" (Phil Palmer, Peter Vale)

France

1. "You Could Have Been with Me" (Lea Maalfrid)
2. "One Man Woman" (Mick Leeson, Peter Vale)

== Charts ==
Chart (1981–82)	Peak position
UK	54
US	15
US AC	6
Netherlands	14
Belgium	23
Canada	13
Japan	46

Year-end chart (1982)	Rank
US Top Pop Singles (Billboard)	64
