= The Family Way (soundtrack) =

Soundtrack album by the George Martin Orchestra
- Released: 6 January 1967
- Recorded: December 1966
- Studio: CTS, London
- Genre: Classical; soundtrack
- Length: 24:59
- Label: Decca (UK); London (US)
- Producer: George Martin

The George Martin Orchestra chronology
George Martin Instrumentally Salutes "The Beatle Girls" (1966)	The Family Way (1967)	Yellow Submarine (1969)

Paul McCartney chronology
The Family Way (1967)	McCartney (1970)

The Family Way is a soundtrack album composed by Paul McCartney, produced and arranged by George Martin, and credited to "the George Martin Orchestra". Released on Decca Records in January 1967 under the full title The Family Way (Original Soundtrack Album), it is the soundtrack to the 1966 film The Family Way, directed by Roy Boulting and starring Hayley Mills. It consists of Martin's arrangements of music composed by Paul McCartney of the Beatles especially for the project. The record was preceded by a non-album single, again credited to the George Martin Orchestra, issued on 23 December 1966 by United Artists Records and comprising "Love in the Open Air" backed with "Theme from 'The Family Way'".

"Love in the Open Air" won the Ivor Novello Award for Best Instrumental Theme in 1968. The Family Way was remastered and released on CD in 1996 with musical compositions omitted from the original album, including the two tracks issued on the 1966 single.

== Composition and recording ==
McCartney and Martin began collaborating on the project in November 1966, shortly before the Beatles started work on their album Sgt. Pepper's Lonely Hearts Club Band. McCartney's contribution to the project was minimal, according to authors Howard Sounes and Steve Turner. McCartney composed a brief piano piece, which Martin then interpreted into several variations and arrangements, sufficient to produce 24 minutes of music. At McCartney's suggestion, one of the versions had a brass band arrangement, anticipating his production of the Black Dyke Mills Band's instrumental "Thingumybob" in 1968. Turner writes that, given the film's setting in northern England, the use of a brass band in the soundtrack might have been part of McCartney's inspiration for the fictitious Sgt. Pepper band, which McCartney termed "a bit of a brass band, in a way".

A second composition was required for a pivotal love scene in the film. Quoting Martin's recollection, Sounes says that he had to "pester Paul for the briefest scrap of a tune" for this piece. Martin recalled that only after he had threatened to write the theme himself did McCartney comply, and that it was created on the spot at McCartney's home in St John's Wood, as Martin stood over McCartney at his piano. Titled "Love in the Open Air", the piece was "a sweet little fragment of a waltz tune", according to Martin.

McCartney, who had initially been enthusiastic about the project, likened his subsequent lack of productivity to a type of writer's block. As a result of the delay, recording for the score did not begin until 15 December. The sessions took place over three days at CTS Studios in London. Members of the George Martin Orchestra included violinists Neville Marriner and Raymond Keenlyside, viola player John Underwood and cellist Joy Hall. Aside from the brass band, other musicians contributed on church organ and tuba.

== Release ==
Professional ratings
Review scores
Source	Rating
AllMusic	2.5/5 stars
Mojo	3/5 stars

Although The Family Way was released in January 1967, most commentators consider George Harrison's Wonderwall Music (1968), also a film soundtrack, to be the first solo album by a member of the Beatles. Unlike with McCartney's film score, Harrison directed and produced the recordings for Wonderwall Music, in addition to playing on the album.

The Family Way was released on CD, in mono, in 2003. In 2011, a new remastered version of the soundtrack was released by Varèse Vintage. It featured the 1967 score in the original sequence, remastered from the first-generation stereo master tapes. It also included the unreleased stereo mix of "A Theme from The Family Way" as a bonus track. This piece was originally issued as the B-side of the 1966 UK/US single by the Tudor Minstrels.

== Track listing ==
All tracks composed by Paul McCartney, arranged by George Martin.

=== Original 1967 release ===
Side one

1. The Family Way

Side two

1. The Family Way

=== 2011 CD reissue ===
1. Cue 2M1 / 2M4
2. 5M1 / 11M3
3. 6M4 / 7M2
4. 6M2 / 1M2
5. 10M1 / 6M3 / 4M1 / 1M3 / 1M4
6. Love in the Open Air (7M3)
7. 2M5
8. 1M1
9. 7M1
10. 11M1 / 11M2 / 10M3 / 8M1
11. 12M1
12. 13M1
13. 13M2
14. Theme from The Family Way

== Personnel ==
- John Underwood – viola
- Joy Hall – cello
- Raymond Keenlyside – violin
- Neville Marriner – violin

The remaining musicians are unknown.
