= Say It Ain't So (album) =

Studio album by Murray Head
- Released: 1975
- Studios: Morgan Studios, Willesden, London
- Genre: Soft rock
- Length: 39:31
- Label: A&M
- Producer: Paul Samwell-Smith

Murray Head chronology
Nigel Lived (1972)	Say It Ain't So (1975)	Between Us (1979)

Professional ratings
Review scores
Source	Rating
AllMusic	link
Christgau's Record Guide	B−

Say It Ain't So is the second studio album by the English actor and singer Murray Head. It was released in 1975 on A&M Records. The album was produced by Paul Samwell-Smith, and the album features sleeve photography by Gered Mankowitz.

== History ==
The explanation for the title track of the album, "Say It Ain't So, Joe", telling the story of baseball player Joe Jackson, along with other players of the Chicago White Sox team, following a game-fixing scandal in 1919, was denied by Murray Head. The subject of the song is to denounce the attitude of Americans who, despite the Watergate scandal, continued to vote for Nixon. This song was covered by Who singer, Roger Daltrey, on his 1977 album One of the Boys.

Musicians appearing on the album include: Bob Weston (ex-Fleetwood Mac) (who played again with Head on Between Us in 1979); Jim Cregan, and drummer Gerry Conway. Tony Kaye (ex-Yas) also appears on "Someone's Rocking My Dreamboat". The backing vocalists include Murray's brother, Anthony Head, and Liza Strike, famous for her appearance on The Dark Side of the Moon by Pink Floyd in 1973. Vicki Brown was also a backing vocalist for Pink Floyd on tour, and also assisted David Gilmour and Roger Waters as solo artists.

== Track listing ==
All songs composed by Murray Head, except where noted.

No.	Title	Writer(s)	Length
1.	"Say It Ain't So Joe"		4:36
2.	"Boy on the Bridge"		3:48
3.	"Boats Away"		4:18
4.	"When I'm Yours"		4:04
5.	"Someone's Rocking My Dreamboat"	Leon René, Otis René, Emerson C. Scott	2:44
6.	"She's Such a Drag"		4:17
7.	"Never Even Thought"		5:02
8.	"Silence Is a Strong Reply"	Murray Head, Bob Weston	2:49
9.	"Don't Forget Him Now"		4:26
10.	"You're So Tasty"		3:27

== Personnel ==
- Murray Head – lead vocals, acoustic guitar, Fender Rhodes piano
- Bob Weston – acoustic, slide and electric guitars, backing vocals
- Alun Davies – guitar, backing vocals
- Jim Cregan – acoustic guitar
- Mickey Finn – rhythm guitar
- Graham Preskett – mandolin
- Bruce Lynch – acoustic and electric bass guitar
- Brian Brocklehurst – acoustic bass
- Arthur Watts – string bass on "Someone's Rocking My Dreamboat"
- Nick South – bass guitar
- Charles Jankle (Chaz Jankel) – Wurlitzer electric piano
- Tony Kaye – piano on "Someone's Rocking My Dreamboat"
- Ann Odell – string arrangement, piano, ARP synthesizer
- Billy Day – organ
- Brian Johnstone – Fender Rhodes electric piano
- Simon Philips – drums
- Gerry Conway – drums
- Glen LeFleur – drums, percussion
- Pete Thompson – drums
- Morris Pert – log drums
- Fitzroy "Brother" James – congas, percussion
- Darryl "Chili" Charles – percussion
- P.J. Crotty – tin whistle
- The Tropic Isles – steel band
- Anthony Head – backing vocals
- Vicki Brown – backing vocals
- Liza Strike – backing vocals
- Sue Lynch – backing vocals
- Pam Keevil – backing vocals
- John Altman – clarinet on "Someone's Rocking My Dreamboat"
- Anthony Healey – trombone on "Someone's Rocking My Dreamboat"
- Noel Norris – trumpet on "Someone's Rocking My Dreamboat"

Production & engineering

- Paul Samwell-Smith – producer
- Martin Levan – engineer, mixing
- Robin Black – engineer, mixing
- Mike Bobak – mixing

Album cover art

- Gered Mankowitz – photography
