= Wave (Murray Head album) =

Studio album by Murray Head
- Released: 1992
- Genre: Rock
- Producer: Murray Head, Paul Whittaker, Steve Fletcher

Murray Head chronology
Watching Ourselves Go By (1990)	Wave (1992)	Innocence (1993)

Innocence

Studio album by Murray Head
- Released: 2000
- Genre: Rock
- Label: Voiceprint Records

Murray Head chronology
Pipe Dreams (1995)	Innocence (2000)	Greatest Hits (2001)

Wave is the eighth studio album by Murray Head. It was released in 1992.

In 2000, Wave was reissued under the title Innocence, which is also the title of a previous album by Murray Head. There was one change to the track listing, "Move Closer" replacing "Feel No Shame".

== Track listing ==
1. "All Eyes Are on the West"
2. "Feel No Shame"
3. "Ocean"
4. "Innocence"
5. "Just Enough"
6. "Caprice"
7. "Nothing To Lose"
8. "Little Bit of Loving"
9. "Fear of Life"
10. "Make It Easy"

=== Innocence reissue ===
1. "Nothing To Lose"
2. "All Eyes to the West"
3. "Move Closer"
4. "Ocean"
5. "Innocence"
6. "Just Enough"
7. "Caprice"
8. "Little Bit of Loving"
9. "Fear of Life"
10. "Make It Easy"
