= The Family Way =

1966 British film by Roy Boulting

- Directed by: Roy Boulting
- Written by: Roy Boulting; Jeffrey Dell
- Based on: "All in Good Time" by Bill Naughton
- Produced by: John Boulting
- Starring: Hayley Mills; Hywel Bennett; John Mills; Marjorie Rhodes; Murray Head; Avril Angers
- Cinematography: Harry Waxman
- Edited by: Ernest Hosler
- Music by: Paul McCartney; George Martin
- Production company: Boulting Brothers
- Distributed by: British Lion Films
- Release dates: 18 December 1966 (UK); June 1967 (US)
- Running time: 115 minutes
- Country: United Kingdom
- Language: English
- Budget: £460,641
- Box office: $2,225,000 (U.S./Canada)

The Family Way is a 1966 British comedy-drama film produced and directed by John and Roy Boulting, respectively, and starring father and daughter John Mills and Hayley Mills. Based on Bill Naughton's play All in Good Time (1963), with screenplay by Naughton, the film began life in 1961 as the television play Honeymoon Postponed. It is about the marital difficulties of a young newlywed couple living in a crowded house with the husband's family.

== Plot ==
After Jenny Piper and Arthur Fitton's rowdy wedding reception at a local Lancashire pub, the newlyweds spend their wedding night at the Fittons' house. Arthur's father, Ezra Fitton, and some drunken guests loudly sing in the living room. Arthur clashes with Ezra, a lifelong gasworks employee who is unable to understand his son's love of literature and classical music. After a strained evening, the newlyweds retire, only for their marital bed to collapse, the result of a practical joke by Arthur's boorish boss, Joe Thompson. Jenny is amused, but Arthur, believing she is laughing at him, is unable to consummate their marriage. Arthur assures Jenny that everything will be fine once they are on their honeymoon in Majorca, but the next day they discover that the travel agent absconded with their money, cancelling the trip.

Unable to afford their own home, Jenny and Arthur live with Arthur's parents and adult brother Geoffrey. The thin walls and lack of privacy exacerbate Arthur's discomfort. As days pass into weeks, the marriage remains unconsummated, straining the couple's relationship. Making matters worse, Arthur works at night while Jenny has a day job. Jenny begins socialising with Geoffrey, who is attracted to her, but she rebuffs his advances. At Jenny's urging, Arthur sees a marriage counsellor, but a gossipy charwoman overhears their session and spreads what was discussed. After Jenny confides to her parents, Liz and Leslie Piper, that the marriage is still unconsummated, they tell Jenny's in-laws. Arthur's mother Lucy, reminisces to the Pipers about her own marriage having a slow start. Ezra tries defending himself when Lucy relates how he brought his friend Billy on their honeymoon and spent more time with him than with her. Lucy later tells Mrs Piper about spending an evening with Billy when Ezra worked late, after which Billy disappeared from their lives.

Joe Thompson, having heard the gossip, mocks Arthur and scornfully "volunteers" to satisfy Jenny. An enraged Arthur batters him, then quits his job. Returning home, he berates Jenny for disclosing their private matters. Their quarrel leads to them finally having sex. The gossipy neighbours overhear them and spread the news.

Meanwhile, the Association of British Travel Agents bond has covered the couple's stolen honeymoon money, and they prepare for a belated one in Blackpool. Jenny's Uncle Fred advises the couple to get their own home; Ezra agrees to help Jenny and Arthur with the down payment on their own cottage, wanting to build a better relationship with Arthur, whom he tearfully calls "son". After Arthur leaves, Ezra ingenuously remarks how much Arthur looks and acts like the long-gone Billy, causing Lucy to console him.

== Cast ==
- Hayley Mills as Jenny Fitton (née Piper)
- Hywel Bennett as Arthur Fitton
- John Mills as Ezra Fitton
- Marjorie Rhodes as Lucy Fitton
- Murray Head as Geoffrey Fitton
- John Comer as Leslie Piper
- Avril Angers as Liz Piper
- Wilfred Pickles as Uncle Fred
- Barry Foster as Joe Thompson
- Liz Fraser as Molly Thompson
- Lesley Daine as Dora
- Andy Bradford as Eddie
- Michael Cadman as Len
- Diana Coupland as Mrs. Rose
- Margaret Lacey as Mrs. Harris
- Helen Booth as Mrs. Lee
- Fanny Carby as Mrs. Stone
- Ruth Gower as Mrs. Pike
- Colin Gordon as Mr. Hutton, the travel agent
- Robin Parkinson as Mr. Phillips, the travel agent's assistant
- Harry Locke as Mr. Stubbs, the housing officer
- Maureen O'Reilly as Miss Hunt, the housing officer's secretary
- Ruth Trouncer as marriage counsellor
- Thorley Walters as the vicar
- Windsor Davies in background role (uncredited)
- Kathy Staff in background role (uncredited)

== Background ==
Bill Naughton wrote a television play for ABC's Armchair Theatre series titled Honeymoon Postponed, which was transmitted in 1961. The Observer described it as "a lively – almost Restoration – Lancashire working class comedy."

Naughton adapted it into a theatre play that premiered in 1963 with Bernard Miles playing the father. It played for six weeks at London's experimental Mermaid Theatre, then transferred to a commercial house, where it ran for three months. London's drama critics awarded it the Best New Play of 1962–1963. Naughton sold the American film and theatre rights for $100,000, enabling him to become a full-time writer.

David Susskind bought the rights to produce the play in America, and cast Eric Portman as the father. However, Portman was unable to play the part.

The play debuted on Broadway in 1965 with Donald Wolfit playing the father. Susskind produced it with Daniel Melnick and Joseph E. Levine in association with the Boulting brothers, who were to make the film version. It closed after only 21 performances.

== Production ==
=== Development ===
John Mills attended the opening night of the play at the Mermaid Theatre. After the performance, he went backstage to seek film rights as a vehicle for himself and his daughter Hayley, but discovered that they had been promised to the Boultings.

In July 1963, it was announced that David Susskind would make a film of the play as a co-production with the Boulting brothers, with John producing and Roy directing. Roy Boulting was writing a script with Naughton and Susskind and was hopeful that Peter Sellers, who had made several films with the Boultings, would play the father. The Boultings then focused on making Rotten to the Core.

The film was financed by British Lion Films and the Boultings. It was the only film made in Britain within a 12-month period financed completely with British capital.

=== Casting ===
The Boultings contacted John Mills while the latter was making King Rat in Hollywood and offered him the role of the father. "I'd call it a comedy with serious intent," said Mills, who called his role "the best part I've had since Hobson's Choice."

Hayley Mills was cast as the bride. She called her role "a most marvellous departure... no more school girl parts for me unless the character happens to be absolutely fascinating." Mills called the film "an answer to Britain's kook generation."

Hywel Bennett was cast after John Boulting saw him in the play A Smashing Time. "We weren't purposely looking for an unknown," said Roy Boulting, "but mostly for someone who had the appearance of both sensitivity and masculinity."

=== Filming ===
The film was shot in Naughton's hometown of Bolton, as well as in Rochdale and Slough. Some interior scenes were filmed at Shepperton Studios. It was known during filming as All in Good Time.

John Mills later wrote in his memoirs that "during the first half hour on the set on the first morning's shooting I knew that I was going to enjoy myself. Roy was not only a superb technician but because he was pro- and not anti-actor, his direction was helpful and sensitive. We all felt perfectly safe in his hands and I personally owe a great deal to him for the final success of Ezra and indeed the whole film."

Hayley Mills did a nude scene in the film, which received much publicity. She called it "a very integral part of the film... the whole thing was handled with great taste." Mills also fell in love with Roy Boulting, but he was married. The two later became a couple and married.

=== Music ===
The soundtrack was scored by Paul McCartney, still a Beatle at the time, and producer George Martin.

== Release ==
The film premiered in London on 18 December 1966. It was released on video on 24 February 1989.

=== Box office ===
The movie became a notable critical and financial success in the UK. It was one of the twelve most popular films at the British box office in 1967. In October 1967, John Boulting claimed it was the most successful British film made over the past year. It was argued "the nude scene certainly didn't hurt at the box-office, nor did the fact that Paul McCartney wrote the soundtrack."

The nude scene led to the film receiving a "condemned" rating by the Catholic Film Office.

The producer's receipts were over £500,000, meaning the film made a profit. The film is rated M in Australia and New Zealand for nudity and sexual references.

=== Critical reception ===
Variety wrote: "Hayley Mills gets away from her Disney image as the young bride, even essaying an undressed scene. Bennett is excellent as the sensitive young bridegroom. But it is the older hands who keep the film floating on a wave of fun, sentiment and sympathy. John Mills is firstclass in a character role as the bluff father who cannot understand his son and produces the lower working-class man's vulgarity without overdoing it. Avril Angers as the girl's acid mother and John Comer as her husband are equally effective, but the best performance comes from Marjorie Rhodes as John Mills' astute but understanding wife."

The Radio Times Guide to Films gave the film 4/5 stars, writing: "Considered somewhat risqué in its day, this gentle comedy can now be seen as a fond portrait of an era when sex was still taboo. Complete with a score by Paul McCartney, it recounts the experience of so many 1960s newlyweds who had to share a house with their in-laws for much of the early part of their married lives. Hywel Bennett is bang on form as the husband so wound up by cohabitation that he is unable to consummate his marriage to the equally impressive Hayley Mills. But it's her real-life dad, John Mills, who steals the show with a splendid study in working-class cantankerousness."

== In popular culture ==
The cover sleeve of "Stop Me If You Think You've Heard This One Before", a single by English rock band The Smiths, features Murray Head (as Arthur's brother Geoffrey) in a still photo from the film. The Smiths single "I Started Something I Couldn't Finish" features by a still of Avril Angers from the same film. Both songs were released from the Smiths' final album, Strangeways, Here We Come.

== See also ==
- All in Good Time, a British film directed by Nigel Cole, based on Ayub Khan-Din's 2007 play Rafta, Rafta, which was based on Bill Naughton's 1963 play All in Good Time and its 1966 film adaptation The Family Way.
