= Strangeways, Here We Come =

Studio album by the Smiths
- Released: 28 September 1987
- Recorded: March–April 1987
- Studios: The Wool Hall (Bath, Somerset, England)
- Genres: Indie rock; indie pop; post-punk
- Length: 36:37
- Label: Rough Trade
- Producers: Johnny Marr; Morrissey; Stephen Street

The Smiths chronology
Louder Than Bombs (1987)	Strangeways, Here We Come (1987)	Stop Me (1988)

Singles from Strangeways, Here We Come
- 1. "Girlfriend in a Coma" Released: 10 August 1987; 2. "Stop Me If You Think You've Heard This One Before" Released: October 1987; 3. "I Started Something I Couldn't Finish" Released: 2 November 1987; 4. "Last Night I Dreamt That Somebody Loved Me" Released: 7 December 1987

Strangeways, Here We Come is the fourth and final studio album by the English rock band the Smiths. It was released on 28 September 1987 by Rough Trade Records, a few months after the band had broken up. As with their other albums, all of the songs were composed by Johnny Marr, with lyrics written and sung by Morrissey. The record marked a stylistic shift for the band, incorporating a broader range of instrumentation and a more experimental sound than their previous releases. It achieved commercial success and has since been regarded by all four band members as their finest work.

Following the critical acclaim of their 1986 album The Queen Is Dead, the Smiths experienced increasing public attention and media presence. Despite internal tensions and the departure of temporary rhythm guitarist Craig Gannon, the band returned to the studio in early 1987 to fulfill their final contractual obligation to Rough Trade. During the recording sessions at the Wool Hall recording studio in Bath, Somerset, relations within the band remained relatively stable. However, Johnny Marr left the band shortly after the sessions were completed, effectively breaking up the band before the album's release.

The album reached number two on the UK Albums Chart, staying on the chart for 17 weeks. It was also an international success, peaking at number 16 on the European Albums Chart from sales covering 18 major European countries, staying on that chart for nine weeks. It rose to number 55 on the US Billboard 200. The album was certified gold by the British Phonographic Industry (BPI) on 1 October 1987 and also by the Recording Industry Association of America (RIAA) on 19 September 1990.

== Background ==
Following the release of The Queen Is Dead on 16 June 1986, the Smiths experienced a significant rise in public impact, peer recognition, and media attention. A legal dispute with their label, Rough Trade Records, delayed the album's release; the record had been completed by the end of 1985 but was withheld for months due to contractual and financial tensions with the label. Johnny Marr described the touring and media attention as exhausting. Although The Queen Is Dead is often considered the band's strongest by critics, neither band members Morrissey nor Marr viewed it as their definitive album.

Bassist Andy Rourke was briefly dismissed from the band in early 1986 amid struggles with heroin addiction, but was soon reinstated. Guitarist Craig Gannon had joined temporarily as a rhythm guitarist, expanding the band to a five-piece. In the months after The Queen Is Dead, the Smiths returned to the UK singles chart with two Top 20 hits, "Panic" and "Ask". The accompanying tour provoked intense scenes of fan hysteria, particularly in North America and England. During this period, "I Know It's Over" emerged as a centrepiece of their live performances, often serving as the final song before the encore, as heard on the live album Rank.

Gannon left the band by the end of 1986, and the Smiths played their final concert at a benefit event at Brixton Academy on 12 December. By 1987, the band had grown frustrated with the "jingly-jangly" label that had followed them throughout their career. That autumn, they announced their departure from Rough Trade and signed with EMI, at which point, according to biographer Simon Goddard, "their position among the big league on the global pop stage seemed more feasible than ever". The deal required them to deliver one final album to Rough Trade before transitioning to EMI.

== Recording and production ==
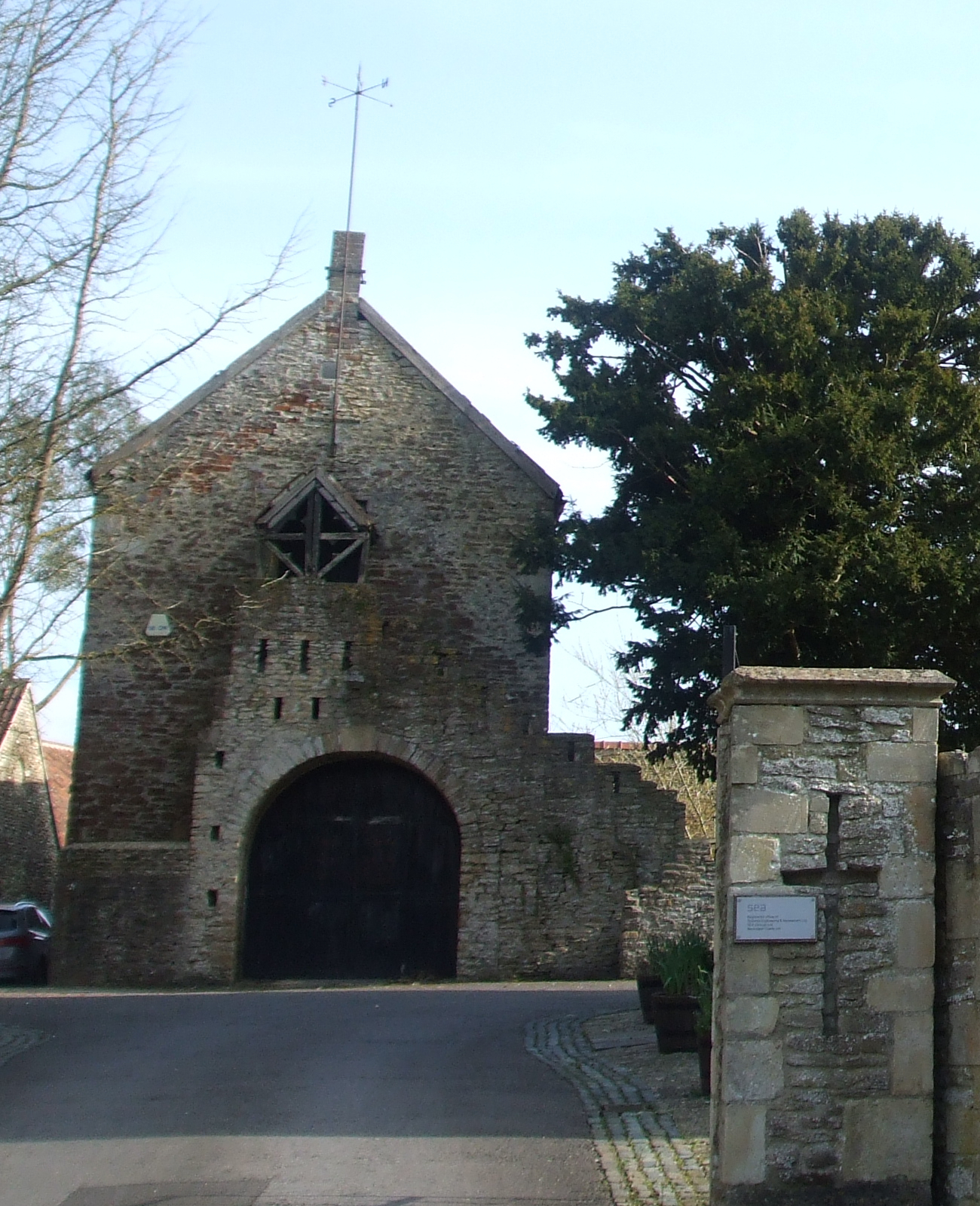
The Wool Hall recording studio in 2021

The Smiths recorded what was to be their final studio album at the Wool Hall studios in Bath, Somerset, England, in March 1987. The sessions began with some friction; on the first night, Marr, after drinking, confronted producer Stephen Street, voicing frustration over the expectations that the Smiths would continue their familiar "jingly-jangly" guitar sound. Marr approached the sessions with a deliberate intention to reduce the use of overdubs and to avoid filling all available sonic space. He described entering the studio with a "new confidence" and a desire to explore different textures and arrangements. Despite underlying tensions, the recording sessions had been notably cohesive. Although the band would dissolve before the album's release, internal relations during the sessions were relatively stable, with the principal source of stress stemming from their situation with Rough Trade.

Recording at the Wool Hall provided a more relaxed atmosphere, with a fully stocked wine cellar often emptied after long sessions by the band and Street. While Morrissey typically retired early, Street recalled that overdubs would continue late into the night, often followed by partying. The sessions were marked by a shift in musical approach and ongoing communication about the band's evolving sound. Ed Power wrote in The Independent that "everyone else was more than willing to join [Marr] in this new love affair. Parties at Wool House became a nightly event. With Morrissey tucked up in bed with his favourite Sylvia Plath anthology, the musicians would cover their favourite Spinal Tap songs into the wee hours".

Two final songs—"I Keep Mine Hidden" and "Work Is a Four-Letter Word"—were recorded in May 1987 as B-sides for the album's lead single, "Girlfriend in a Coma", and marked the Smiths' last recordings together. Three further singles were released from Strangeways, Here We Come, with their B-sides drawn from earlier sessions or archival material. Morrissey and Marr have stated that the album is the band's best, with Morrissey adding, "we say it quite often. At the same time. In our sleep. But in different beds". Drummer Mike Joyce also named the album as the band's best, as did Street. Between the album's recording in March and its release in September 1987, Marr left the Smiths, effectively ending the band before they recorded any material for EMI.

== Musical style ==
Music critics have categorised Strangeways, Here We Come as a pop rock recording. The album features a more experimental and sonically varied approach compared to the band's previous albums. During its production, Marr felt the band was ready to enter a new musical phase, and was determined to avoid a formula and move away from their previous "jingly-jangly indie" sound. He started to look for different influences, finding an interest in the Beatles' self-titled 1968 album. Marr further stated that he intended Strangeways, Here We Come as an homage to early records by the Walker Brothers. The band's instrumentation branched out as well, including synthesised saxophone, string arrangements on keyboards, and drum machine additions. Martin C. Strong of The Great Rock Discography contends the album's "morbid, fractured sound apparently confirmed the growing musical differences between the group's main protagonists."

Strangeways, Here We Come is the only Smiths album to feature Morrissey playing a piano, featured on the song "Death of a Disco Dancer". The aforementioned track's lyrics reflect a sense of fatalism and disillusionment, with Morrissey expressing scepticism about ideals such as peace and love. "I Started Something I Couldn't Finish" is propelled by Marr's serrated, glam rock-inspired riffs, while on the rousing "Stop Me If You Think You've Heard This One Before", he added to his sonic arsenal by dropping a metal-handled knife onto his Fender Telecaster for a distinctive percussive effect that added tension to a narrative of regret and intoxication. Marr referred to "Last Night I Dreamt That Somebody Loved Me" as something that went "beyond rock and roll, beyond pop, it's also beyond everything else The Smiths ever recorded". Goddard describes the atmosphere of the song as having a "perceptible darkness [...] a tremor of foreboding, of imminent danger, of bad times just around the corner", suggesting themes of melancholy and apprehension. Douglas Wolk observed that Morrissey had begun to lean into "deliberate self-parody", describing "Death at One's Elbow" as "a camped-up burlesque of 'That Joke Isn't Funny Anymore'". He singled out the autoharp on "I Won't Share You" as "thrilling", even as he noted that the orchestral flourishes elsewhere sometimes felt excessive.

== Artwork and packaging ==
The album takes its title from Manchester's Strangeways Prison (now called HM Prison Manchester), whilst the line "Borstal, here we come" is taken from the novel and film Billy Liar. "Strangeways, of course, is that hideous Victorian monstrosity of a prison operating 88 to a cell", Morrissey has said. Marr has said "I've learned to love the title ... it was a bit overstating things somewhat. A little bit obvious. But it's OK. I was always intrigued by the word strangeways. I remember as a kid, when I first heard that the prison was really called that, I wondered had it not occurred to anybody to change the name? It's still befuddling, really". Morrissey has also stated, "Really it's me throwing both arms to the skies and yelling 'Whatever next?'"

The sleeve for Strangeways, Here We Come, which was designed by Morrissey, features a murky shot of actor Richard Davalos, best known for appearing in the 1955 film East of Eden. In the photo, Davalos is looking at his costar in that film, James Dean, who is cropped from the image. Dean was a hero of Morrissey's, about whom the singer wrote a book called James Dean Is Not Dead. Five years later, when designing the sleeves for the U.S. release of WEA's Best... I compilation, Morrissey again chose Davalos as a cover star, and Davalos is looking at Dean, who is once again cropped. As revealed in Jo Slee's collection of the Smiths and Morrissey sleeve artwork, Peepholism, Davalos was not the original choice for cover star. Morrissey wanted to use a still of Harvey Keitel in Martin Scorsese's 1967 film Who's That Knocking at My Door, but Keitel declined to allow him to use the image. In 1991, Keitel relented, and the image was used on T-shirts and stage backdrops for Morrissey's 1991 Kill Uncle Tour.

== Release ==
Strangeways, Here We Come was released on 28 September 1987 via Rough Trade Records in LP, cassette and CD formats. The album was supported by three singles: "Girlfriend in a Coma", released on 10 August 1987; "I Started Something I Couldn't Finish", on 2 November; and "Last Night I Dreamt That Somebody Loved Me", issued on 7 December. "Stop Me If You Think You've Heard This One Before" was originally intended for single release in November 1987. However, following the Hungerford massacre—where 16 people were killed—the BBC declined to play the track due to concerns over the lyric planning "a mass murder". As a result, the song was not released as a single in the United Kingdom but was issued in other territories, including the United States, Australia, and Germany. Upon release, the album achieved commercial success. In the United Kingdom, it peaked at number two on the UK Albums Chart and remained there for 17 weeks. Internationally, it reached number 16 on the European Albums Chart—compiled from sales across 18 major European markets—and stayed on that chart for nine weeks. In the United States, the album reached number 55 on the Billboard 200. It was certified gold by the British Phonographic Industry (BPI) on 1 October 1987, and later received a gold certification from the Recording Industry Association of America (RIAA) on 19 September 1990.

== Critical reception ==
Professional ratings
Review scores
Source	Rating
AllMusic	4/5 stars
Blender	4/5 stars
Chicago Tribune	2/4 stars
The Encyclopedia of Popular Music	4/5 stars
Los Angeles Times	3.5/4 stars
Pitchfork	8.3/10
Q	4/5 stars
The Rolling Stone Album Guide	4/5 stars
Uncut	4/5 stars
The Village Voice	B

Reviewing Strangeways, Here We Come for the New Musical Express, Len Brown concluded that "it's the weird balance of Morrissey's mortal humour with Marr's beatific melodies that establishes The Smiths' final greatness", deeming the album to be a masterpiece that "surpasses even The Queen Is Dead in terms of poetic, pop and emotional power." Andy Strickland of Record Mirror deemed the album "an apt swansong" that contains some of the Smiths' best ever songs, despite a suspicion that Marr is "holding back". Robert Christgau of The Village Voice gave the album a grade of B and noted that, after warming up to "the supple smarts of their sound", he approached the album expecting "even tastier goodies", only to be struck by its grim tone. He observed that "in three of these songs somebody's dead or dying, in three more somebody contemplates murder", and the rest are marked by "a selfish pet of the sort that led to the aforementioned threats".

Reviewing the album retrospectively for AllMusic, Stephen Thomas Erlewine gave the album a score of four stars out of five and said it was "a subtly shaded and skilled album, one boasting a fuller production than before ... while it doesn't match The Queen Is Dead or The Smiths, it is far from embarrassing and offers a summation of the group's considerable strengths". Douglas Wolk, writing for Pitchfork, gave it an 8.3 out of 10, and reflected on Strangeways, Here We Come as the Smiths' album about "desperately trying not to repeat themselves", noting that it was tempting to hear it as a premonition of their breakup, even more so than the band's previous albums. Andrew Harrison of Select deems it "better than it gets credit for: more jokes than usual [and] a genuine tearjerker in the closer 'I Won't Share You'."

The album ranked number 3 among "Albums of the Year" for 1987 in the annual NME critics' poll, and "Girlfriend in a Coma" ranked number 11 among songs. In 2000 it was ranked number 601 in Colin Larkin's All Time Top 1000 Albums. Rolling Stone said the record "stands as one of their best and most varied". Slant Magazine listed the album at number 69 on its list of "Best Albums of the 1980s", writing that "Whether or not Strangeways, Here We Come ended the Smiths' brief career with their best album has been the subject of considerable debate for nearly a quarter century, but it definitively stands as the band's most lush, richest work". Jonathan Kennaugh of The Rough Guide to Rock (1999) believed the band's "vigorous self-belief of old" was largely absent, noting the record's foreboding atmosphere and singling "I Won't Share You" out as a poignant epitaph.

== Track listing ==
All lyrics are written by Morrissey; all music is composed by Johnny Marr.

Side one
No.	Title	Length
1.	"A Rush and a Push and the Land Is Ours"	3:00
2.	"I Started Something I Couldn't Finish"	3:47
3.	"Death of a Disco Dancer"	5:26
4.	"Girlfriend in a Coma"	2:03
5.	"Stop Me If You Think You've Heard This One Before"	3:32

Side two
No.	Title	Length
6.	"Last Night I Dreamt That Somebody Loved Me"	5:03
7.	"Unhappy Birthday"	2:46
8.	"Paint a Vulgar Picture"	5:35
9.	"Death at One's Elbow"	2:01
10.	"I Won't Share You"	2:48
Total length:		36:37

== Personnel ==
Credits are adapted from the album's liner notes.

The Smiths

- Morrissey – vocals, piano ("Death of a Disco Dancer"), handclaps ("Paint a Vulgar Picture")
- Johnny Marr – guitar, piano, keyboards, harmonica, marimba ("A Rush and a Push and the Land Is Ours"), harmonium ("Unhappy Birthday"), autoharp ("I Won't Share You"), synthesised string and saxophone arrangements, additional vocals ("Death at One's Elbow"), handclaps ("Paint a Vulgar Picture")
- Andy Rourke – bass guitar, keyboards ("A Rush and a Push and the Land Is Ours"), handclaps ("Paint a Vulgar Picture")
- Mike Joyce – drums, percussion, handclaps ("Paint a Vulgar Picture")

Additional musicians

- Stephen Street – additional drum machine programming ("I Started Something I Couldn't Finish", "Paint a Vulgar Picture", "Death at One's Elbow"), sound effects ("Last Night I Dreamt That Somebody Loved Me", "Death at One's Elbow")

Technical

- Johnny Marr – co-producer
- Morrissey – co-producer
- Stephen Street – co-producer, string arrangement ("Girlfriend in a Coma")
- Steve Williams – assistant engineer
- Tim Young – mastering
- Steve Wright – photography

== Charts ==
Chart performance for Strangeways, Here We Come
Chart (1987)	Peak position
Australian Albums (Kent Music Report)	28
Canadian Albums (RPM)	28
Dutch Albums (Album Top 100)	20
European Top 100 Albums	16
German Albums (Offizielle Top 100)	33
New Zealand Albums (RMNZ)	14
Swedish Albums (Sverigetopplistan)	13
UK Albums	2
UK Independent Albums	1
US Billboard 200	55
US Cash Box	29

== Certifications ==
Certifications for Strangeways, Here We Come
Region	Certification	Certified units/sales
United Kingdom (BPI)	Gold	100,000^{^}
United States (RIAA)	Gold	500,000^{^}
^{^} Shipments figures based on certification alone.

== See also ==
- List of 1980s albums considered the best
