= Sooner or Later (Murray Head album) =

Studio album by Murray Head
- Released: 1987
- Genres: Pop, rock
- Label: Virgin
- Producer: Steve Hillage

Murray Head chronology
| Restless (1984) | Sooner or Later (1987) | Watching Ourselves Go By (1990) |

Professional ratings
Review scores
| Source | Rating |
|---|---|
| Allmusic | 2/5 stars |

Sooner or Later is the seventh studio album by Murray Head. It was released in 1987.

In 2001 it was reissued on CD by Voiceprint's Headcase label with two bonus tracks, "Picking up the Pieces" and "Some People". It was produced by Steve Hillage and features his partner in life Miquette Giraudy on keyboards. Hillage played most of the instruments and arranged the songs. Head later called the album his "one and only brush with serious technology", describing months in the studio with Hillage built around an early UMI sequencer.

== Track listing ==
All songs composed by Murray Head unless noted.

1. "You Are" - 5:02
2. "With a Passion" (Barry Hovis, Mark Mancina) - 3:37
3. "Love List"
4. "Love is Believing" - 5:11
5. "In the Heart of You" (Peter Veitch) - 4:20
6. "Paper Thin" (Geoffrey Richardson) - 3:26
7. "Fear and Ambition" - 5:14
8. "Wanderer" - 5:41
9. "Lana Turner" - 3:44

=== Additional tracks ===
1. "Picking Up the Pieces" (Chris Difford, Glenn Tilbrook) - 4:03
2. "Some People" - 6:42

== Personnel ==
- Murray Head - vocals, guitar
- Phil Palmer - guitar
- Paul Weston - guitar
- Geoffrey Richardson - violin, flute, guitar, kalimba, string arrangements
- Simon Jeffes - string arrangements
- Ian Maidman - bass guitar
- Miquette Giraudy - keyboards
- Ingmar Kiang - keyboards
- Peter Veitch - piano
- Gary Barnacle - saxophone
- La Fuga Horn Section - horns
- Danny Cummings - drums
- Luís Jardim - percussion
- Barbara Gaskin - background vocals
- Dave Stewart - background vocals
- Anthony Stewart Head - background vocals
- Jakko M. Jakszyk - background vocals
- Sally Ann Triplett - background vocals
- Grainne Renihan - background vocals
