= Restless (Murray Head album) =

Studio album by Murray Head
- Released: 1984
- Genre: Rock
- Label: Virgin
- Producer: Steve Nye

Murray Head chronology
Shade (1983)	Restless (1984)	Sooner or Later (1987)

Professional ratings
Review scores
Source	Rating
AllMusic	2.5/5 stars

Restless is the sixth studio album by Murray Head. It was released in 1984.

== Track listing ==
All songs composed by Murray Head unless noted.

1. "When You're in Love" (Murray Head, Phil Palmer, Peter Veitch) - 3:34
2. "Catching Eddie at It" - 3:16
3. "Modern Boy" - 4:37
4. "Peril in Venice" - 5:40
5. "Salvation (Missionary Madness)" - 4:05
6. "Mario" - 3:34
7. "African Tourists" - 4:04
8. "Hold Me" - 3:59
9. "I Don't Care" - 3:44
10. "Maybe Tomorrow" - 5:21

== Personnel ==
- Murray Head - vocals, guitar
- Danny Cummings - percussion
- Anthony Head, Nicola Kerr - backing vocals
- Simon Jeffes - violin, string arrangements
- Jamie Lane - drums
- Ian Maidman - bass guitar
- Trevor Murrell - drums (6)
- Phil Palmer - lead guitar
- Geoffrey Richardson - guitar, viola
- Peter Veitch - keyboards
- Steve Nye - piano (8)
- Gavyn Wright - lead violin, string arrangements
- The Fuga - horns (7)
- "Paac" Quaye, Enoch Baidoo, Remi Ogedenegbe, Ruth Atna Mann, Warren Adadevoh - vocals (5, 7)
