= Shade (Murray Head album) =

Studio album by Murray Head
- Released: October 1982
- Recorded: Le Cassan; Riverside Recordings, London
- Genre: Rock
- Label: Virgin Records (UK); Mercury Records (France)
- Producer: Murray Head, Steve Nye

Murray Head chronology
Find the Crowd (1981)	Shade (1982)	Restless (1984)

Shade is the fifth studio album by Murray Head. It was released in October 1982.

In 1996, it was reissued by Sony Records with three bonus tracks.

== Track listing ==
All songs composed by Murray Head unless noted.

1. "Peace of Mind" - 3:22
2. "Corporation Corridors" - 3:46
3. "All We Can Do Is Hold On" (Joe Sample) - 3:42
4. "Not Your Problem" - 3:41
5. "Joey's on Fire" (Murray Head, Peter Veitch) - 4:49
6. "Maman" - 4:01
7. "Grace" - 3:56
8. "Dragonfly" - 3:03
9. "Shades of the Prison House" - 5:55

=== 1996 reissue ===
1. "Peace of Mind" - 3:22
2. "Corporation Corridors" - 3:46
3. "All We Can Do Is Hold On" - 3:42
4. "Not Your Problem" - 3:41
5. "Joey's on Fire" (Head, Veitch) - 4:49
6. "Maman" - 4:01
7. "Grace" - 3:56
8. "Dragonfly" - 3:03
9. "Mario"
10. "All the Way"
11. "When You're In Love"
12. "Shades of the Prison House" - 5:55

== Charts ==
Charts (1982)	Peak position
France (SNEP)	3

=== Certifications ===
Region	Certification	Certified units/sales
France (SNEP)	Gold	100,000^{*}
^{*} Sales figures based on certification alone.

== Personnel ==
- Murray Head - vocals
- Phil Palmer - guitar
- Alan Spenner - bass guitar
- Peter Veitch - keyboards
- Gerry Conway - drums
- Geoffrey Richardson - viola
