= Nigel Lived =

Studio album by Murray Head
- Released: 1973
- Recorded: 25 June – 30 July 1972
- Genre: Rock
- Label: CBS
- Producer: Joseph Wissert

Murray Head chronology
Nigel Lived (1972)	Say It Ain't So (1975)

Professional ratings
Review scores
Source	Rating
Allmusic	link

Nigel Lived is the first album by the British vocalist and actor Murray Head, released in 1973 on CBS Records.

It is a concept album which tells the story of Nigel, a young singer who arrives in London seeking a career in the music business. His early optimism gives way to disillusionment, struggle, and finally heroin addiction. The original vinyl release came in an elaborate package, with a lyric sheet featuring pages from Nigel's diary to depict the course of his gradual disintegration.

In 2017 Intervention Records reissued Nigel Lived on 180-gram double 45 rpm vinyl. The reissue was 100% analog mastered using the original master tapes provided to the label by the original sound engineer on the project, Phill Brown. The album quickly became Intervention's best-selling reissue ever and resulted in Murray Head's decision to perform songs from the album live for the first time ever.

== Track listing ==
Side One (labelled "Success"):

1. "Pacing On the Station" – 4:55
2. "Big City" – 3:29
3. "Bed & Breakfast" – 2:28
4. "The Party" – 3:13
5. "Ruthie" – 3:19
6. "City Scurry" – 1:58
7. "When You Wake Up in the Morning" – 3:10

Side Two ("Failure"):

1. "Why Do We Have to Hurt Our Heads" – 3:13
2. "Pity the Poor Consumer" – 2:29
3. "Dole" – 3:05
4. "Nigel, Nigel" – 2:11
5. "Miss Illusion" – 2:18
6. "Religion" – 4:46
7. "Junk" – 8:49

== Background ==
This album followed Head's appearance as Judas, a leading role on the recording of the rock opera Jesus Christ Superstar, and his subsequent 1971 single "Superstar".

His supporting musicians include the Giles brothers of Giles, Giles and Fripp, a group which evolved into King Crimson.

== Personnel ==
- Murray Head – vocals; acoustic guitar on "Ruthie"
- Mark Warner – acoustic guitar on tracks 1, 3–5, 10, 12–14, electric guitar on tracks 2, 6, 7, 9, 14, slide guitar on tracks 3, 6, 7
- Dave Wintour – bass guitar on tracks 5, 7, 9, 11
- Peter Giles – bass guitar on "Junk"
- Phil Chen – bass guitar on "The Party" and "Religion"
- Clive Chaman – bass guitar on tracks 1, 2, 6, 8
- Spike Heatley – double bass on "Bed & Breakfast" and "Dole"
- Peter Robinson – electric Clavinet on "The Party", electric piano on "Big City", church organ on "Pity the Poor Consumer", piano on tracks 1,2,8,14
- Fiachra Trench – conductor, pipe organ on "Miss Illusion", piano on "Dole"
- John Donnelly – flugelhorn on "Bed & Breakfast", trumpet on "City Scurry"
- Nick DeCaro – accordion on "Miss Illusion"; string and horn arrangements
- James Harpham – contrabass on "Bed & Breakfast"
- Tony Coe – clarinet on "Bed & Breakfast" and "When Do You Wake Up in the Morning", saxophone on tracks 1,6,14
- Jimmy Chester – baritone saxophone on "Bed & Breakfast", saxophone on tracks 1,6,14
- Jimmy Hastings – saxophone on "Pacing On the Station" and "Junk"
- Tommy Whittle – saxophone on "Pacing On the Station" and "Junk"
- Chris Mercer – baritone saxophone on "Dole", electric saxophone on "Bed & Breakfast", plastic saxophone on "The Party", tenor saxophone on "Big City"
- Henry Lowther – trumpet on "City Scurry"
- David Chapman – trombone on "Nigel, Nigel"
- Dave Charman – trombone on "Bed & Breakfast" and "City Scurry"
- Martin Fry – tuba on "Religion"
- Ralph Ho – horn
- Michael Giles – drums on tracks 7, 9, 11, 14, percussion on "Ruthie"
- Cozy Powell – drums on tracks 1, 2, 6, 8
- Miguel Baradas – steel drums on "Religion"
- Ray Cooper – percussion on "Bed & Breakfast" and "Miss Illusion"
- Frank Ricotti – congas on "The Party", bass marimba on "Miss Illusion"
- Barry De Souza – congas on "Big City" and "The Party", drums on "Religion"
- Glen LeFleur – drums on "The Party"
- Chris Karan – tabla on "Religion"
- Sue Glover – vocals
- Sunny Leslie – vocals
- Friendly Sisters – backing vocals
- Kay Garner – backing vocals on tracks 1, 2, 12
- Sue Garner – backing vocals
- Skaila Kanga – electric harp on "Religion"
- Chris Neil – harmonica on "Pacing On the Station"
- Graham Preskett – mandolin on "Miss Illusion", electric violin on "Why Do You Have to Hurt Our Heads"
- Michael Rennie – strings, violin
- Jack Rothstein – violin strings on tracks 5, 7, 11
- Timothy Bond – choirmaster on "Religion"

Technical

- Phill Brown – chief engineer
