= The Wool Hall =

British recording studio

- Location within Somerset
- 51°15′44.3″N 2°17′15.5″W
- Location: Beckington, Somerset, England

History
- Built: 16th century

Listed Building – Grade II
- Official name: The Wool Hall
- Designated: 11 March 1968
- Reference no.: 1058239

The Wool Hall is a recording studio in the village of Beckington, near Frome, Somerset, England. It was originally a residential studio set up by Tears for Fears in the 1980s and used by many artists, including the Smiths and Van Morrison. Since 2005, it has been used as a private recording studio.

== History ==
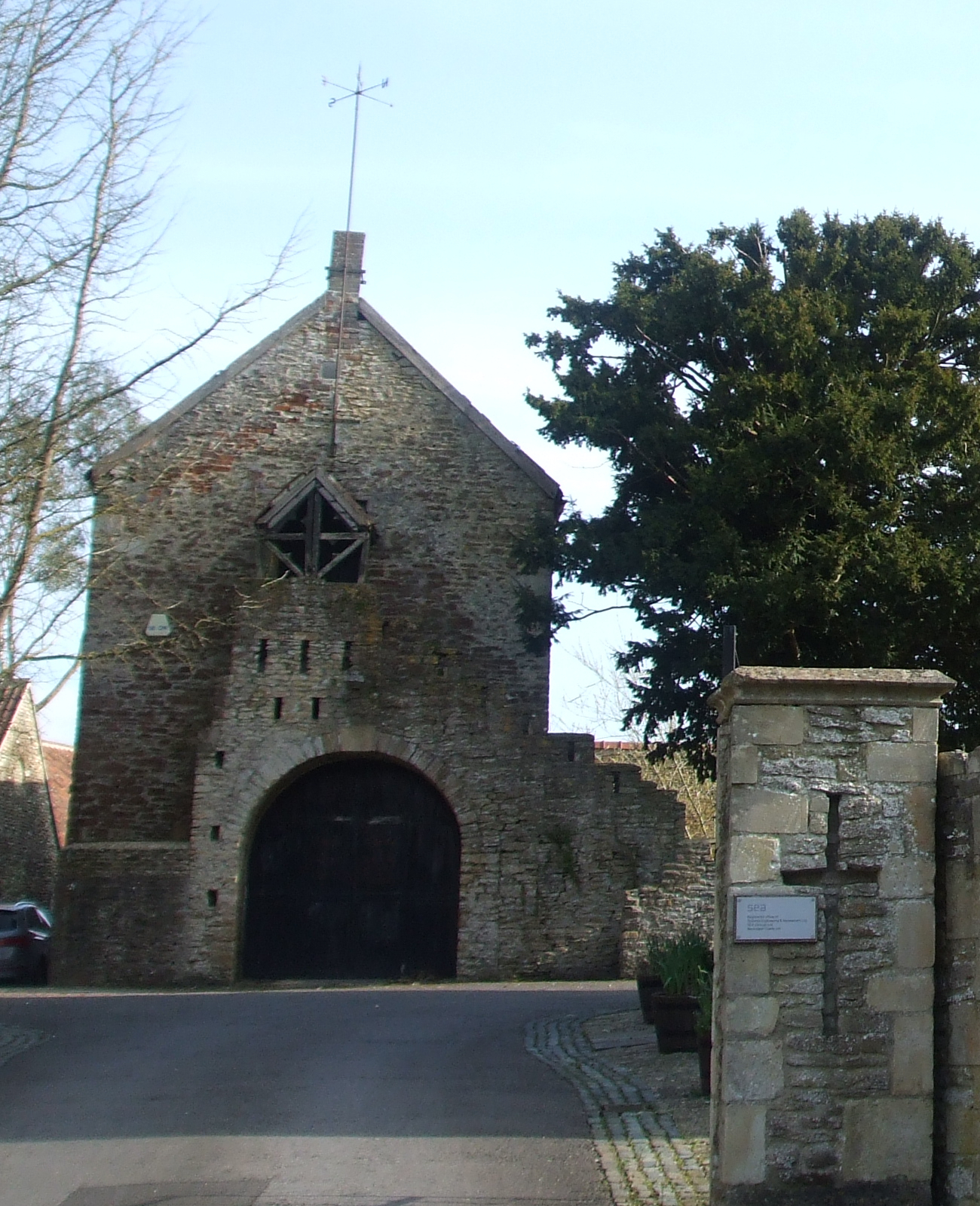
The Wool Hall, showing the exterior staircase leading to the plank door—one of the main features that makes the building historically notable.

The Wool Hall dates back to the 16th century, when Beckington was a centre of the wool trade in Somerset. For a time, it was associated with the nearby Beckington Castle and by the 19th century, it was restored for use as a home and store. In 1968, the hall became a grade II listed building. According to Historic England, its notable features include "the semi-circular headed archway over the entrance to the ground floor which incorporates an exterior staircase with rubble balustrade leading to a plank door on the first floor protected by a pent-roofed porch", "double plank doors with decorative iron hinges to [the] ground floor entrance", a "19th-century fireplace in four-centred stone surround", and a "portion of tie-beam roof probably of the 16th century".

In the 1980s, The Wool Hall was converted into a recording studio by the pop group Tears for Fears, who used it to record their album Songs from the Big Chair (1985). In 1986 the studio was opened for use by other artists. Van Morrison bought the studio in 1994, having already recorded five albums there, and it served as one of his main recording studios and a store for a large collection of analogue master tapes recorded during his decades-long musical career. In August 2002, Morrison put the studio up for sale for just under a million pounds and it became a private home and studio the following year.

Music executive producer Denis Ingoldsby and son Kes Ingoldsby purchased the Wool Hall in 2005 and used it as a base until 2009, when he relocated to Marsh Lock, Henley on Thames. The Wool Hall fell into disrepair and was put up for sale in 2015 as a "period farmhouse incorporating residential recording studios". The Wool Hall complex (comprising four separate buildings, including the original Wool Hall itself, a six-bedroom farmhouse, a modern annex, and a garage and laundry) was later converted into three separate homes; its recording equipment was dismantled and sold piece-by-piece at an auction. The historic Wool Hall studio building and annex were subsequently bought by Luke Potashnick, former guitarist of rock band Rooster. In 2020, Somerset Live reported that he had submitted plans for a "large-scale renovation of the site".

== Use as a recording studio ==
Many artists used The Wool Hall during its 20-year history as a residential studio. The Smiths recorded Strangeways, Here We Come (their final album) there in 1987. According to Morrissey it was at the end of one of those sessions, in "a glut of meetings with accountants and lawyers at The Wool Hall Studio... [that] the Smiths breathed a last exhausted sigh and folded." Morrissey also recorded his first solo album, Viva Hate, at the studio shortly after.

Other artists who used the studio included Annie Lennox, Ash (Free All Angels), Joni Mitchell (parts of Chalk Mark In A Rain Storm), Julia Neigel, The Pretenders (Last of the Independents), David Sylvian (Secrets of the Beehive and Rain Tree Crow), Sisters of Mercy (parts of Floodland), 808 State, Stereophonics, and Paul Weller. Some of Peter Murphy's Deep was recorded there; Squeeze's Babylon and On was mixed there, as was The Cure's Show; and Tears for Fears, owning the studio, recorded much of their work at The Wool Hall.

== See also ==
- List of British recording studios
