= Say It Ain't So, Joe (song) =

Single by Murray Head

from the album Say It Ain't So
- B-side: "Don't Forget Him Now"
- Released: 1975
- Recorded: Morgan Studios (Willesden, London)
- Genre: Soft rock; folk rock
- Length: 4:36
- Label: Island
- Songwriter: Murray Head
- Producer: Paul Samwell-Smith

Murray Head singles chronology
"Heaven on Their Minds" (1969)	"Say It Ain't So, Joe" (1975)	"Someone's Rocking My Dreamboat" (1976)

Audio
- "Say It Ain't So, Joe" on YouTube

"Say It Ain't So, Joe" is a song written and performed by the English actor and singer, Murray Head. The song was released on Head's second studio album Say It Ain't So, and was also released as a single in 1975.

== History ==
According to Head, he wrote the song about fallen heroes. He wrote the following comment in the liner notes when he re-released the song on the compilation album, When You're in Love (1995):

"Say It Ain't So, Joe" was provoked by a seventies documentary on Richard Nixon prior to his resignation. The presenter was asking the editor of a small town newspaper outside Washington, how, in the face of conclusive evidence and proof, his readers could still show such undying support for the president they elected. The editor likens the situation to a scandal in the twenties, when [Shoeless] Joe Jackson, the famous baseball player, was rumoured to have taken a bribe to sink his team in the final of the World series. His fans hung around the stadium chanting "Say it ain't so Joe".

The song is about heroes and their "Clay feet". It is also a plea from myself to the kind of 'Joe Public' who in fear of losing face, refuse to relinquish their faith in a fallen idol.

The song is on an album which has sold over a million copies and was produced by Paul Samwell-Smith, who recently decided to re-record the song. Shortly afterwards I was watching another documentary on the O. J. Simpson case and they showed a note pinned to his gate on which was written "Say it ain't so Joe". Two days later a friend, just returned from L.A., rang me to tell me they'd seen placards with that same old phrase. The occasion seemed apt for a re-release.

– Murray Head, 1994

== Roger Daltrey's version ==
In 1977, Roger Daltrey covered the song for his third solo studio album One of the Boys. This cover version features John Entwistle (bass guitar) of the Who and Jimmy McCulloch (guitar) of Paul McCartney and Wings. Daltrey's version was released as a single (apart from in the UK) and peaked at No. 20 in the Netherlands but failed to chart elsewhere. Entwistle, McCulloch, and Keith Moon (drums) of the Who appeared in the music video.

== Other covers ==
- The Hollies, in 1979, on their 19th UK studio album Five Three One - Double Seven O Four
- Gary Brooker, in 1979
- Game Theory, in 1985, live on KALX Berkeley; released on the 2014 reissue of Dead Center (Omnivore Recordings)
- Marian Gold, in 1996
- The Nolans, in 2001
- Sylvain Cossette, in 2001
- Nolwenn Leroy, in 2005, on the compilation album Déjà Musique Succès Vol.1 (Canada)
- Jim Leverton, in 2006, recorded live and released on album End of the Pier Show
- Lena Hall, in 2020, recorded a version used in the 2020 TV series Snowpiercer
- Manigance, Volte-Face in 2014. (French version)
