= Murray Head =

English actor and singer (born 1946)

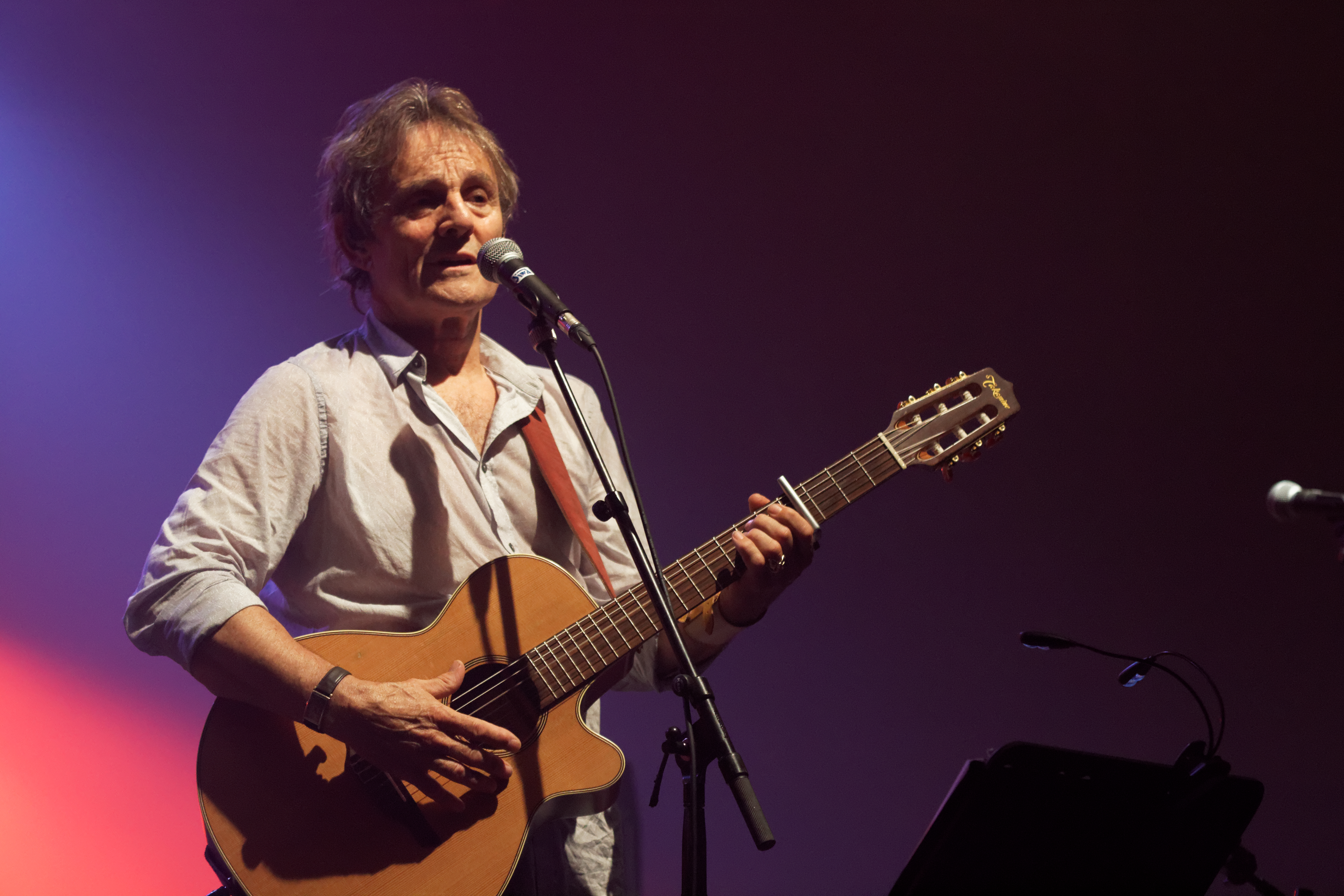
- Head in concert at Quimper, France (2013)

Background information
- Born: Murray Seafield St George Head; 5 March 1946 (age 80); London, England
- Genres: Rock; new wave; pop
- Occupations: Actor; singer
- Instruments: Vocals; guitar
- Works: Discography
- Years active: 1966–present
- Labels: Island; A&M; Virgin; Mercury; Voiceprint
- Website: murrayhead.com

Murray Seafield St George Head (born 5 March 1946) is an English actor and singer. Head has appeared in a number of films, including a starring role as the character Bob Elkin in the BAFTA award-winning and Oscar-nominated 1971 film Sunday Bloody Sunday. As a musician, he is most recognised for his international hit songs "Superstar" (from the 1970 rock opera Jesus Christ Superstar) and "One Night in Bangkok" (the 1984 single from the musical Chess, which topped the charts in various countries). He has been involved in several projects since the 1960s and continues to record music, perform concerts, and make appearances on television either as himself or as a character actor.

== Early life and education ==
Head was born in London to Seafield Laurence Stewart Murray Head and Helen Shingler. Head's father was a documentary filmmaker for Verity Films. Head's mother played Mme Maigret alongside Rupert Davies in the BBC 1960s television adaptation of the Maigret novels written by Georges Simenon. Head's younger brother Anthony Head was also an actor, who played the role of Rupert Giles in the TV series Buffy the Vampire Slayer.

Head was educated at the Lycée Français Charles de Gaulle in South Kensington, London and Hampton School in Hampton, Middlesex. He attended Chiswick Polytechnic (A level college) in the early 1960s.

== Career ==
Head began writing songs as a child, and by the mid-1960s he had a London-based recording contract. He briefly appeared as one of the hosts of the Bristol-based television pop show Now! alongside Michael Palin. He had limited success, until asked by Tim Rice and Andrew Lloyd Webber to play Judas Iscariot on the original concept album version of Jesus Christ Superstar; at the time, he had been appearing in the West End production of the musical Hair. With the Trinidad Singers, the song "Superstar" peaked at No. 14 on the Billboard Hot 100 chart in 1971.

He made his film debut in The Family Way (1966), which featured Hayley Mills, Hywel Bennett and John Mills in the leading roles. Head won a leading role in the Oscar-nominated film Sunday Bloody Sunday (1971), alongside Peter Finch and Glenda Jackson. Despite these successes, he received little public attention in the next ten years (except for his single release, "Say It Ain't So, Joe" in 1975, which has been covered by the Who's lead vocalist, Roger Daltrey, among others, including Gary Brooker of Procol Harum, and the Hollies, who also covered his song "When I'm Yours" in 1979. "Never Even Thought" has been covered by both Colin Blunstone and Cliff Richard.

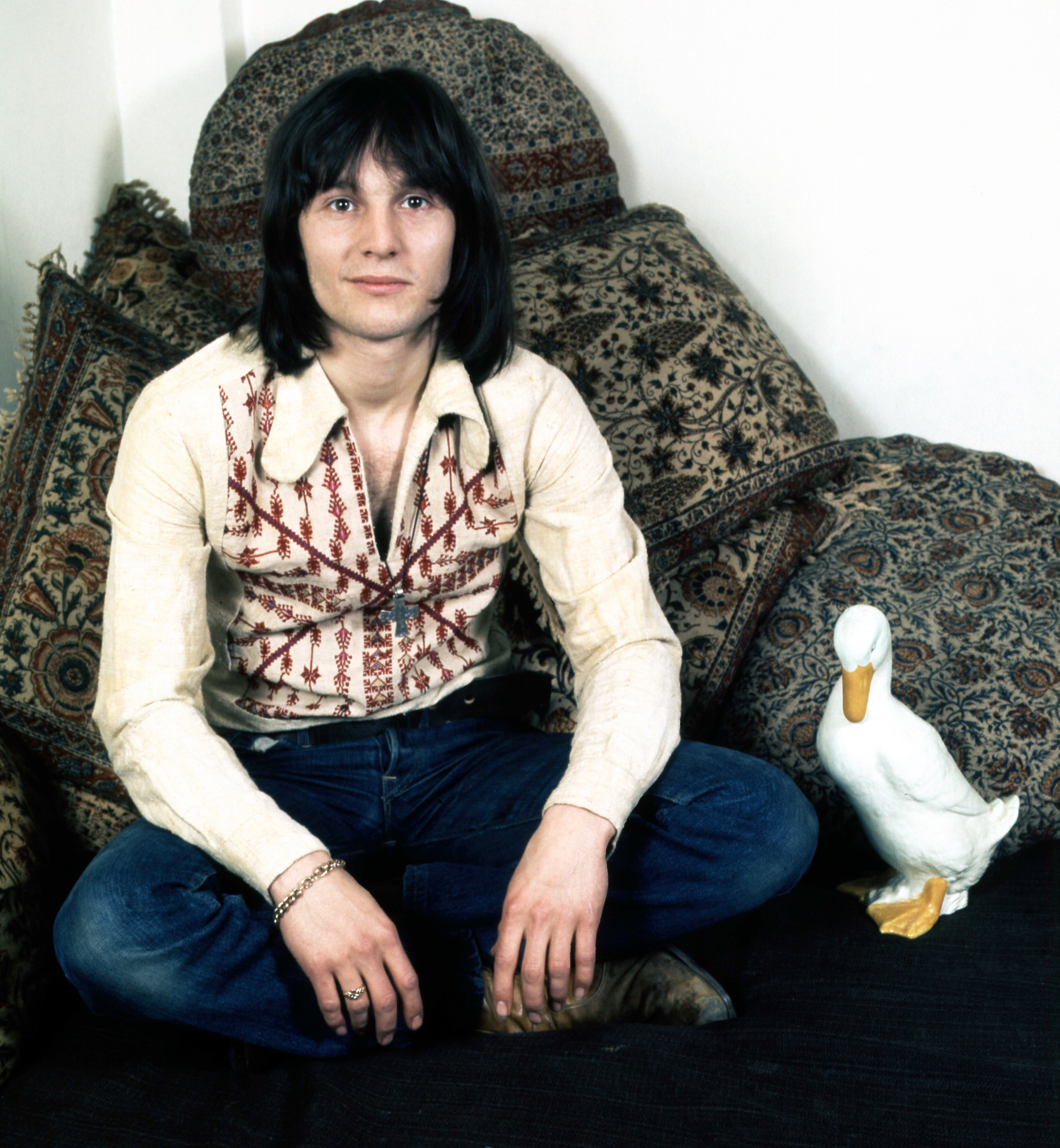
Head in 1972

In 1973, he appeared in a radio drama, The Fourth Tower of Inverness. In 1979, Head appeared in the miniseries Prince Regent and the final episode of the ITV program Return of the Saint.

Head reappeared in the spotlight in 1984 as the American on the concept album for the musical Chess. The song "One Night in Bangkok" featured Head on lead vocals, affecting a New York accent. It became the last significant Broadway/West End number to be a hit single on American and German radio until "No Matter What" by Boyzone in 1996. "One Night in Bangkok" was a success in both Europe and North America. Head performed the role of world chess champion Frederick "Freddie" Trumper in the London West End stage production of Chess that premiered on 14 May 1986. The show ran in London until 8 April 1989; during its run, Head departed with vocal strain.

After that, Head had little recording success in the UK or the United States. This fact would later be underscored in a radio segment featured on The Kevin and Bean Show on KROQ-FM in Los Angeles, in which the hosts would phone Head in the morning to find out "What's Up with Murray Head?" Fluent in French, he has released a number of albums in that language. A duet with Marie Carmen, "Une femme un homme", was released in 1993 and was a hit in French-speaking Canada.

In 1999, Head co-wrote the screenplay to Les Enfants du Siècle.

He has appeared on television in the UK on The Bill, Casualty, North Square and Judge John Deed. He also played artist Jack Hollins, the new love interest of Gina Ward (since after told Phil Bellamy that she and him are over), on ITV's Heartbeat from 2005 to 2006. On 15 March 2010 he appeared in the BBC drama Doctors playing a pop singer, Pete Perry, trying to make a comeback, in which Head sang Robert Johnson's "Love in Vain". He appeared in Doctors again on 18 April 2019 as a different character, a drummer named Brian 'Sticky' Burns. In Canada, he was part of the cast of the 2002 television mini-series Music-Hall, which played on the Radio-Canada network. In 2011 he appeared in the first episode of the series Vera (episode "Hidden Depths") as Peter Calvert.

Head's picture, from a still of The Family Way, appeared on the 1987 cover of the British band the Smiths single "Stop Me If You Think You've Heard This One Before" and the album cover of the band's 1988 compilation album Stop Me.

== Personal life ==
Head married Susan Ellis Jones in 1972; they divorced in 1992. He has two daughters. Head married Lindy Ross (née Newton) in 2019.

== Discography ==
- Nigel Lived (1972)
- Say It Ain't So (1976)
- Between Us (1979)
- Voices (1981)
- Shade (1982)
- Restless (1984)
- Sooner or Later (1986)
- Wave (1992)
- Pipe Dreams (1995)
- Tête à tête (2007)
- Rien n'est écrit (2008) – Also distributed as a double album, with new versions of songs including "Say It Ain't So", "Never Even Thought", and "You Are"
- My Back Pages (2012) – Performs songs by other artists such as Bob Dylan, Kansas, Spencer Davis Group, The Who, Roxy Music, and Dido

== Selected filmography ==
Film

Film Credits
Year	Title	Role	Notes
1966	The Family Way	Geoffrey Fitton	Sings "Someday Soon"
1967	Two Weeks in September	Dickinson's assistant	
1971	Aphrousa	Nicholas	
1971	Sunday Bloody Sunday	Bob Elkin	
1971	Sweet Deception	Tony the Englishman	
1973	Gawain and the Green Knight	Gawain	
1975	El poder del deseo	Javier	
1977	The Frenchwoman	David Evans	
1987	White Mischief	Lizzie	
1989	Un été d'orages	Jack	Also wrote the music
1989	La Barbare	Michael	
1996	Beaumarchais	William, Lord Rochford	
1999	Le Grand Serpent du Monde	Tom	
2002	The Lovers of the Nile	The Colonel	
2003	I, Cesar	Charley Fitzpatrick	
1989	No pasaran	Peter Konchelski	
1989	Cinématon	Self	
2015	Fever	Jim	

Television

Television Credits
Year	Title	Role	Notes
1967	St Ives	Saladin	Two episodes
1971	Shirley's World	Ray King	
1974	The Fortunes of Nigel	Lord Dalgarno	
1974	Seven Faces of a Woman	Tom	
1974	Intent for Murder	Larry	
1974	Play for Today	Singer	Episode "Taking Leave"
1979	Return of the Saint	Pierre de la Garde	Episode 24 "The Diplomat's Daughter"
1979	Prince Regent	George Canning	Three episodes
1989	Boon	Rupert Cole	Series 4 Episode 3 "The Relief of Matty King"
1998	The New Adventures of Robin Hood	Ripley	
1999	The Knock	Mike Hewson	Two episodes
2000	Casualty	Billy Cooper	Series 15 Episode 6 "Choked: Part Two"
2000	North Square	Judge Martin Bould	Eight episodes
2000	The Vice	Tommy Roker	Two episodes
2002	Asbestos	Peter Bedford	
2002	Music-Hall	Clife Maisie	
2003	Rosemary & Thyme	Nev Connolly	
2004	The Bill	Charles Mawdsley	
2005-2007	Heartbeat	Jack Hollins	Three episodes
2007	Judge John Deed	Judge Prévin	
2007	Holby City	Doug Finn	Three episodes
2009	Relive	Steven Winterley	
2010	Doctors	Pete Perry	Episode "Birth of the Blues"
2011	Vera's Mysteries	Peter Calvert	
2012	Holby City	Steve Rurner	
2013	Doctors	Leo Treadwell	Episode "Difficulty"
2014	Holby City	Billy Tressler	Three episodes
2014	Horsehead	Jim	
2017	Doctors	Ralphy Aspden	Two episodes
2019	War of the Worlds	Mikel	

== See also ==
- List of artists who reached number one on the Australian singles chart
- List of show business families
- List of sibling pairs
