= Church Street Market =

Market in Marylebone, London, England

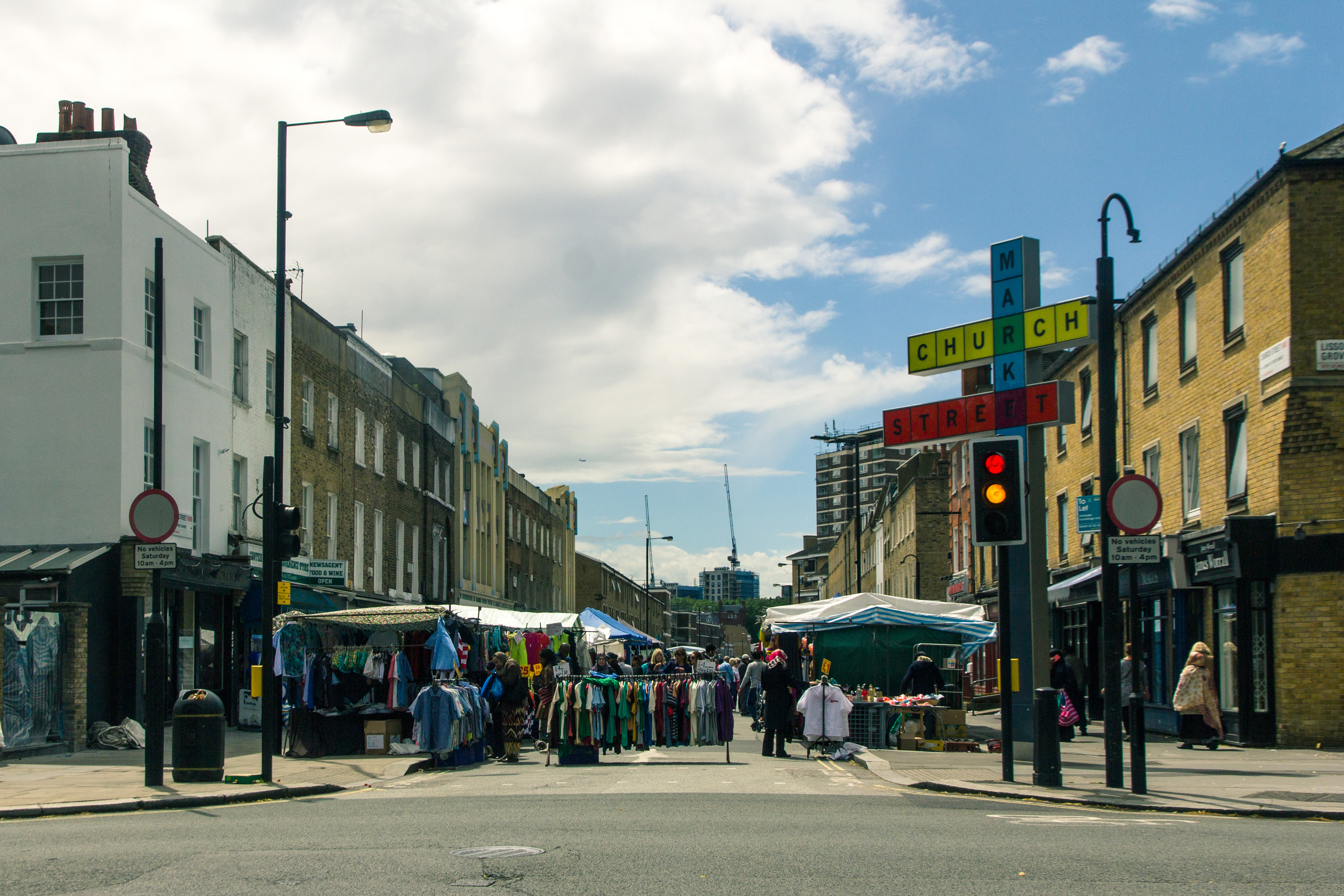
- Church Street Market in 2016
- Location: Church Street, Marleybone, London; Church Street, Marleybone, London; 51.523416°N 0.170355°W
- Opening date: 1830 (196 years ago)
- Management: City of Westminster
- Owner: City of Westminster
- Environment: Outdoor
- Goods sold: Street food, household goods, fashion
- Days normally open: Monday to Saturday
- Website: westminster.gov.uk/licensing/markets-and-street-trading
- Location within City of Westminster

Church Street Market is a large outdoor street market on Church Street in the Marylebone area of the City of Westminster. Street trading licences are issued by Westminster City Council.

The market is open Monday to Saturday from 08:00 to 18:00 and sells:

- fresh food, flowers and plants,
- household goods,
- bags,
- clothing,
- shoes,
- delicatessen, and
- international street food.

== History ==
Originally privately owned and known as Portman Market it was established in 1830 by the Act for establishing a Market in the Parish of Saint Mary-lebone, in the County of Middlesex which moved the hay and straw market from Picadilly to the part of Church Street between Carlisle and Salisbury Streets. The market mainly sold hay and straw, butter, poultry, butchers' meat, and other provisions. In the late nineteenth century it was owned by William Portman, a member of the House of Lords, and operated by solicitors Allen and Edwards on behalf of the estate of the late Thomas Bolton.

The market had been in decline since the 1880s. With most of the Portman Estate liable in inheritance tax, the market buildings were sold in 1906, the market closed in 1907, and many traders took their barrows onto the street creating Church Street Market.

Nearly a century later, in the early nineteen eighties, the market was servicing the Kensal Green, Kilburn, Maida Vale, and Paddington areas with mostly fruit and vegetables at the Eastern end of the market (from the junction with Edgware Road to the junction with Salisbury Street), with antiques and vintage wares predominating on the western end of the market (from Salisbury Street to Kensal Green, the site of the Alfies Antique Market since 1976.

In the mid-nineties there were about 200 stalls on the market on Fridays and Saturdays with the same split between produce and antiques as a decade before as well as unlicensed traders selling counterfeit designer clothing on the junction with Salisbury Street.

== Transport ==
=== Bus ===
6, 13, 16, 82, 98, 139, 189, 274 and 332.

=== Railway and tube ===
Baker Street, Edgware Road (Bakerloo line), Edgware Road (Circle, District and Hammersmith & City lines), and Marylebone.
