= Street names of Lisson Grove =

This is a list of the etymology of many street names in the London district of Lisson Grove most broadly defined which has the occasionally contested limits of St John's Wood Road: north, Park Road and Baker Street: east, Marylebone Road: south and Edgware Road/Maida Vale: west. This is alternatively the northern half of Marylebone, excluding the long dissociated St John's Wood, especially in station-centric terms common in the 21st century. Well within these borders is Marylebone station.

In oldest terms Marylebone was the medieval parish, see map at Ossulstone. It forms six ecclesiastical (Anglican) parishes today – two cover this area.

Name	Origin	Whether personal/owner-based
Aberdeen Place	land formerly owned by Harrow School; this street was named for the Earl of Aberdeen, a governor of the school in the 1820s	yes
Alpha Close	after the Greek letter, and Alpha Road (now Lilestone Street) the first street to be developed in the first major phase (in 1799)	no
Ashbridge Street	after Arthur Ashbridge, District Surveyor for Marylebone 1884–1918; formerly Exeter Street	yes
Ashmill Street	land formerly owned by the Portman estate; this street is named for Ash Mill in Devon where they owned land; it was Devonshire Street, but was later changed to avoid confusion with similarly named streets	yes
Baker Street	after Edward Baker, friend and business partner of the Portman family	yes
Balcombe Street	maybe an early corruption of Batcombe, Dorset, in line with other Dorset-linked street names	yes
Bell Street	formerly Bell Lane, it runs through the former Bell Field, possibly named for a former inn of this name on Edgware Road	no
Bendall Mews	after Sir Talbot Hastings Bendall Baker, brother of Edward Baker, friend and business partner of the Portman family	yes
Bernhardt Crescent	unknown	
Blandford Square	after Blandford Forum, Dorset, where the local Portman family had a seat	yes
Boldero Place	as this area was formerly home to the warehouses of the firm Spencer, Turner & Boldero	yes
Boscobel Street	after a former inn here called The Royal Oak, by association with Charles II who hid from Parliamentary forces in the Royal Oak at Boscobel House	no
Boston Place	the land here was formerly called Boston Field	yes
Broadley Street and Broadley Terrace	this land was formerly owned by the Portman estate; this street is named for Broadley Wood, Dorset where they owned land; it was Earl Street	yes
Burne Street	after one Mr Burne, who purchased land here in 1792	yes
Capland Street	land formerly owned by the Portman estate; this street is named for Capland, Somerset where they owned land	yes
Casey Close	unknown	
Chagford Street	after the stannary town Chagford, Devon; this land was formerly owned by the Portman estate and Edward Portman, 1st Viscount Portman was Lord Warden of the Stannaries 1865–88	yes
Church Street	after the nearby St Mary on Paddington Green Church	no
Clifton Court	possibly after Clifton, Bristol	
Corlett Street	probably after Hubert C Corlette, Victorian-era artist and local resident	yes
Cosway Street	after Richard Cosway, Regency-era painter	yes
Cunningham Place	this land was formerly owned by Harrow School; this street was named for Reverend John William Cunningham, a governor of the school in the 1810s	yes
Daventry Street	South was Union Street; north was William Street. unknown	
Dorset Close and Dorset Square	this land was formerly owned by the Portman estate; this street is named for Dorset where they owned land	yes
Edgware Road	as it leads to Edgware, Middlesex	no
Fisherton Street	Broadley Street near here was formerly Earl Street, and the surrounding streets were given earldom-related names in the early 19th century; this was named after Fisherton, Salisbury, Wiltshire, by association with the Earls of Salisbury	yes
Frampton Street	after the sculptor and local resident George Frampton	yes
Gateforth Street	almost certainly for Gateforth in Yorkshire, why so named (in 1914) in unknown	
George Peabody Court	after George Peabody, American philanthropist	yes
Glentworth Street	after Edmund Pery, 1st Earl of Limerick (Lord Glentworth), 18th and 19th century politician and local resident	yes
Great Central Street	after the adjacent Marylebone railway station, originally the terminus of the Great Central Railway	no
Grendon Street	this land was in medieval times owned by the Order of Knights of the Hospital of Saint John of Jerusalem; the street is named for Walter Grendon, Grand Prior 1400–16	yes
Grove Gardens	after Lisson Grove	no
Harewood Avenue and Harewood Row	this land was formerly owned by the Portman estate; this street is named for Emma Portman, Viscountess Portman, daughter of Henry Lascelles, 2nd Earl of Harewood, wife of Edward Portman, 1st Viscount Portman	yes
Harrow Street	land formerly owned by Harrow School	yes
Hatton Row and Hatton Street	thought to be after a local builder of this name	yes
Hayes Place	after the developer of this street Francis Hay, who lived in Hayes, Middlesex	yes
Henderson Drive	unknown, made for Wharncliffe Gardens Estate	
Highworth Street	unknown, land formerly owned by Harrow School	
Huntsworth Mews	this land was formerly owned by the Portman estate; this street is named for Huntsworth, Somerset where they owned land	yes
Ivor Place	unknown; formerly Upper Park Place	
Jerome Crescent	unknown, medieval ownership was shared with Grendon Street	
Lilestone Street	after the former manor of Lilestone which covered this area	no
Linhope Street	unknown	
Lisson Grove and Lisson Street	corruption of Lilestone, the former manor which covered this area, which may mean li(tt)le-ton (manor/estate) for being the lesser in the parish	no (probably)
Lodge Road	as it leads to the Hanover Lodge in Regent's Park	no
Lorne Close	after the John Campbell, 9th Duke of Argyll (the Marquess of Lorne), husband of Princess Louise, Duchess of Argyll, daughter of Queen Victoria	yes
Luton Street	unknown	
Lyons Place	this land was formerly owned by Harrow School; this street was named for the school's founder John Lyon	yes
Maida Vale	took its name from a public house named after John Stuart, Count of Maida, which opened on the Edgware Road soon after the Battle of Maida in 1806	yes, indirectly
Mallory Street	land in medieval times owned by the Order of Knights of the Hospital of Saint John of Jerusalem; the street is named Robert Mallory, Grand Prior 1433–40	yes
Melcombe Place and Melcombe Street	this land was formerly owned by the Portman estate; this street is named for Melcombe, Somerset where they owned land	yes
Miles Place/Miles Buildings	unknown	
Mulready Street	after 18th and 19th century artist William Mulready	yes
North Bank	after a former crescent of villas of this name, demolished to build the adjacent railway lines in the 1890s	no
Northwick Close and Northwick Terrace	this land was formerly owned by Harrow School; this street was named for John Rushout, 2nd Baron Northwick, a governor of the school in the 1800s	yes
Oak Tree Road	after former land nearby called Oak Tree Field	no
Orchardson Street	after Victorian era artist and local resident William Quiller Orchardson	yes
Palgrave Gardens	unknown, street post-dates 1900	
Park Road	after the adjacent Regent's Park	no
Paveley Street	this land was in medieval times owned by the Order of Knights of the Hospital of Saint John of Jerusalem; the street is named either for Richard de Paveley (Grand Prior 1315–21) or John de Paveley (Grand Prior 1358–71)	yes
Penfold Place and Penfold Street	after Rev. George Penfold, vicar of several local churches in the early 1800s	yes
Plympton Place and Plympton Street	after Plympton, a stannary town. Formerly Little Grove Street and formerly owned by the Portman estate and Edward Portman, 1st Viscount Portman was Lord Warden of the Stannaries 1865–88	yes
Pollitt Drive	unknown, street post-dates 1900	
Portman Gate	land formerly owned by the Portman estate	yes
Ranston Street	for the Baker family, assistants of local landowners the Portmans, who owned land in Ranston, Dorset	yes
Rossmore Close and Rossmore Road	this land was formerly owned by the Portman estate; they owned a property called Rossmore	yes
St John's Wood Road	this land was in medieval times owned by the Order of Knights of the Hospital of Saint John of Jerusalem	yes
Salisbury Street	Broadley Street near here was formerly Earl Street, and the surrounding streets were given earldom-related names in the early 19th century; this was named for the Earls of Salisbury	yes
Samford Street	unknown	
Shroton Street	for the Baker family, assistants of local landowners the Portmans, who owned land in Shroton, Dorset	yes
Siddons Lane	after 19th century actress Sarah Siddons, who lived nearby at Clarence Gate	yes
Stalbridge Street	for the Baker family, assistants of local landowners the Portmans, who owned land in Stalbridge, Dorset	yes
Swain Street	unknown, street post-dates 1900	
Taunton Mews and Taunton Place	this land was formerly owned by the Portman estate; this street is named for Taunton, Somerset where they owned land	yes
Tresham Crescent	land in medieval times owned by the Order of Knights of the Hospital of Saint John of Jerusalem; the street is named for Thomas Tresham, Grand Prior 1557–59	yes
Venables Street	named for Revered Edward Veneable, vicar of the nearby Christ Church, Bell Street	yes
Victoria Passage	likely after Queen Victoria of the United Kingdom	yes
Whitehaven Street	Broadley Street near here was formerly Earl Street, and the surrounding streets were given earldom-related names in the early 19th century; this was named for the Earls of Carlisle and was originally Little Carlisle Street, later changed after Whitehaven, Cumberland	yes
