= Lisson Grove =

Street in London

Coordinates: 51.525°N 0.170°W

- Location within Greater London
- OS grid reference: TQ270823
- London borough: Westminster
- Ceremonial county: Greater London
- Region: London
- Country: England
- Sovereign state: United Kingdom
- Post town: LONDON
- Postcode district: NW1, NW8
- Postcode district: W2
- Dialling code: 020
- Police: Metropolitan
- Fire: London
- Ambulance: London
- UK Parliament: Queen's Park and Maida Vale; Cities of London and Westminster
- London Assembly: West Central

Lisson Grove is a street and district in the City of Westminster in London, England. The neighbourhood contains a few important cultural landmarks, including Lisson Gallery, Alfies Antique Market, Red Bus Recording Studios, the former Christ Church, now the Greenhouse Centre, Stringers of London and the Seashell of Lisson Grove.

The heart of the community and retail/services zone is Church Street Market, which runs between Lisson Grove itself and Edgware Road.The market specialises in antiques and bric-à-brac, and has flourished since the 1960s. The area saw its suburban decades – on the edge of London – from the late 18th century, and some fine Georgian terraces remain. Early residents included artists such as Benjamin Haydon and Charles Rossi, whose former cottage still stands at 116 Lisson Grove. Lord's Cricket Ground adjoined Lisson Grove in the early nineteenth century before re-locating to St Johns Wood to the north. The area is bounded by St John's Wood Road to the north, Regent's Park to the east, Edgware Road to the west and Marylebone Road to the south.

Church Street electoral ward, as currently drawn, is approximately the same. Lisson Grove is predominantly residential, with a mid-to-high population density for Inner London. The council's profile describes Church Street as an ethnically diverse ward, having one of the highest concentrations of social housing in the borough with a substantial estate renewal programme underway.

== History ==
=== Manor of Lileston ===
Lisson Grove, occasionally referred to as Lissom Grove, takes its name from the manor (estate) of Lileston, which was included in the Domesday Book in 1086. Domesday recorded the presence of 8 households within the manor, suggesting a population of around forty. The manor stretched as far as the boundary with Hampstead.

From the 12th century onwards, the Manor of Lileston and the neighbouring Manor of Tyburn) were served by the parish of St Marylebone, an area which had consistent boundaries until the parish's successor, the Metropolitan Borough of St Marylebone merged with neighbouring areas to form the City of Westminster in 1965.

The Manor of Lileston subdivided c. 1236 with the Manor of Lisson Green becoming an independent landholding.

The edges of Lisson Grove are defined by the two current Edgware Road stations facing onto Edgware Road or Watling Street as it was previously known, one of the main Roman thoroughfares in and out of London. The road is also the western boundary of the wider Marylebone district.

=== Early development ===
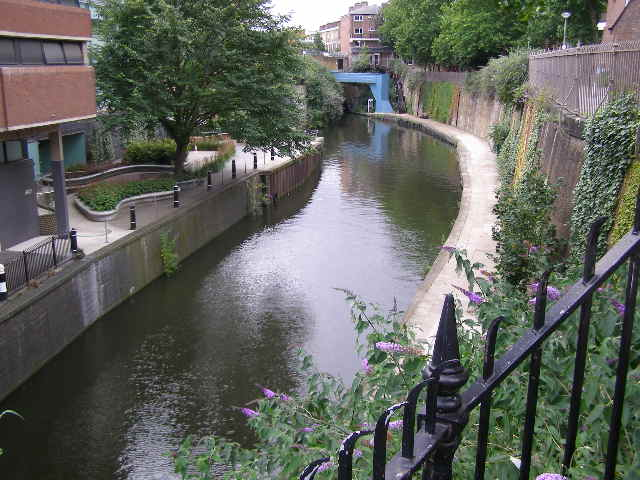
The Regent's Canal was completed in 1820.

Until the late 18th century the district remained essentially rural. Much of Lisson Grove had become a slum in Victorian London, notorious for drinking, crime and prostitution particularly in its pockets of extreme poverty with archetypal squalor, overcrowding and dilapidation. The arrival of the Regent's Canal in 1810 and the railway at Marylebone in 1899 led to rapid urbanisation of Lisson Grove.

=== Post-WWI development ===
After World War I, the Prime Minister, David Lloyd George, announced a policy of "Homes Fit for Heroes", leading to a sponsored housing boom from which Lisson Grove benefitted. In 1924, St Marylebone Borough Council completed the Fisherton Street Estate of seven apartment blocks in red-brick neo-Georgian style with high mansard roofs grouped around two courtyards. Noted for their innovation as some of the first social housing to include an indoor bathroom and toilet, since 1990 this has been a conservation area The blocks were named mostly for the notable former residents of Lisson Grove and its surrounding areas, which drew Victorian landscape painters, sculptors, portraitists and architects:

- Lilestone: the medieval manor stretching to Hampstead before Lisson/Lilestone Grove became a separate manor in about 1236
- Huxley: Thomas Henry Huxley, the self-taught biologist and ardent Charles Darwin supporter lived at 41 North Bank in the 1850s.
- Gibbons: Grinling Gibbons (1648–1721), a master carver who worked on St Pauls
- Landseer: Edwin Landseer, famous for sculpting the lions in Trafalgar Square
- Capland: land formerly owned by the Portman estate; this street is named for their interests in Capland, Somerset, see Street names of Lisson Grove
- Frith: William Silver Frith (1850–1924), sculptor
- Orchardson: William Quiller Orchardson (1832–1910), painter
- Dicksee: Francis Dicksee, a noted Victorian painter
- Eastlake:Charles Eastlake (1836–1906), British architect and furniture designer
- Tadema: Lawrence Alma-Tadema
- Poynter: Edward Poynter (1836–1919)
- Stanfield: George Clarkson Stanfield and his son, both artists.
- Frampton: George Frampton, the sculptor had lived nearby at Carlton Hill from 1910 and may have given his name to Frampton Street and Frampton House
- Wyatt: Matthew Cotes Wyatt, who lived at Dudley Grove House, Paddington

=== Post-WWII development ===
After World War II, further social housing was completed at the Church Street Estate (1949) and the larger Lisson Green Estate (1975). In 1960 a new Labour Exchange was established on Lisson Grove to much fanfare, and later featured in punk music history as the place where members of The Clash first met. The area also became known for its antiques trade.

In the 2010s, Westminster City Council have proposed extensive regeneration.

=== Notable residents ===
- Charles Rossi sculptor at 21, Lisson Grove, 1810
- Leigh Hunt, resided at 13, Lisson Grove North on his release from Horsemonger Prison in 1815 and was visited on many occasions by Lord Byron here
- Benjamin Haydon, painter at 21 Lisson Grove, 1817, tutor of Edwin Landseer and his brother
- Edwin Landseer (1802–1873) and various members of his family congregated to live at Cunningham Place. From 1825 he first lived at 1, St John's Wood Road on the corner of Lisson Grove in a small cottage on the site of Punker's Barn. This was later demolished in 1844 to make place for a small but "rather aristocratic" house (built by Thomas Cubitt, who also built Osborne House on the Isle of Wight for Queen Victoria). The Cubitt designed house was later demolished in 1894 to make way for artisan workers homes built by the railway arranged as Wharncliffe Gardens.
- George Augustus Henry Sala, journalist, born in 1828, recalls growing up in Lisson Grove during the 1830s "when the principal public buildings were pawnbrokers, and 'leaving shops', low public houses and beershops and cheap undertakers."
- Catherine Sophia Blake, William Blake's widow, lived from 1828 to 1830, at 20 Lisson Grove North, London (renumbered 112 Lisson Grove, London NW1) as housekeeper to Frederick Tatham. (Original building demolished.)
- Samuel Palmer, landscape painter and etcher lived at 4, Street, Lisson Grove, Marylebone
- Mary Shelley moved to North Bank, 28 March 1836 for one year with her son
- Thomas Henry Huxley, resident at North Bank during the 1850s
- James Augustus St John moved in 1858 from North Bank to Grove End Road
- Dr Southwood Smith moved to Lisson Grove in 1859 to work at the London Fever Hospital. Smith's granddaughter Octavia Hill, whom he brought up, later lived at 190 Marylebone Road becoming a founder of the Peabody Trust and have a great impact on the social housing movement evident in Lisson Grove from the 1890s onwards.
- Emily Davies, founder of Girton College, Cambridge lived at 17, Cunningham Place from 1863 to 1875 with her mother.
- George Eliot and her husband bought The Priory, 21 North Bank in 1863 and held many of her Sunday receptions during the 17 years she spent there until 1880.
- William Henry Giles Kingston born in London, 1814 at Harley Street, lived at No. 6, North Bank
- Jerome K. Jerome attended the Philological School, now Abercorn School on the corner of Lisson Grove and Marylebone Road during the early 1870s.
- Arthur Machen, at Edward House, 7 Lisson Grove during World War I until the 1920s.
- Agatha Christie rented 5, Northwick Terrace during 1918–1919
- Guy Gibson, V.C recipient, leader of the Dambusters Raid lived at 32 Aberdeen Place between 1918 and 1944.

== Geography ==
Lisson Grove is predominantly residential in West London, with a mid-to-high population density for Inner London. The council's profile describes Church Street as an ethnically diverse ward, having one of the highest concentrations of social housing in the borough with a substantial estate renewal programme underway.

The heart of the community and retail is Church Street Market, which runs between Lisson Grove itself and Edgware Road.The market specialises in antiques and bric-à-brac, and has flourished since the 1960s.

== Arts and antiques ==
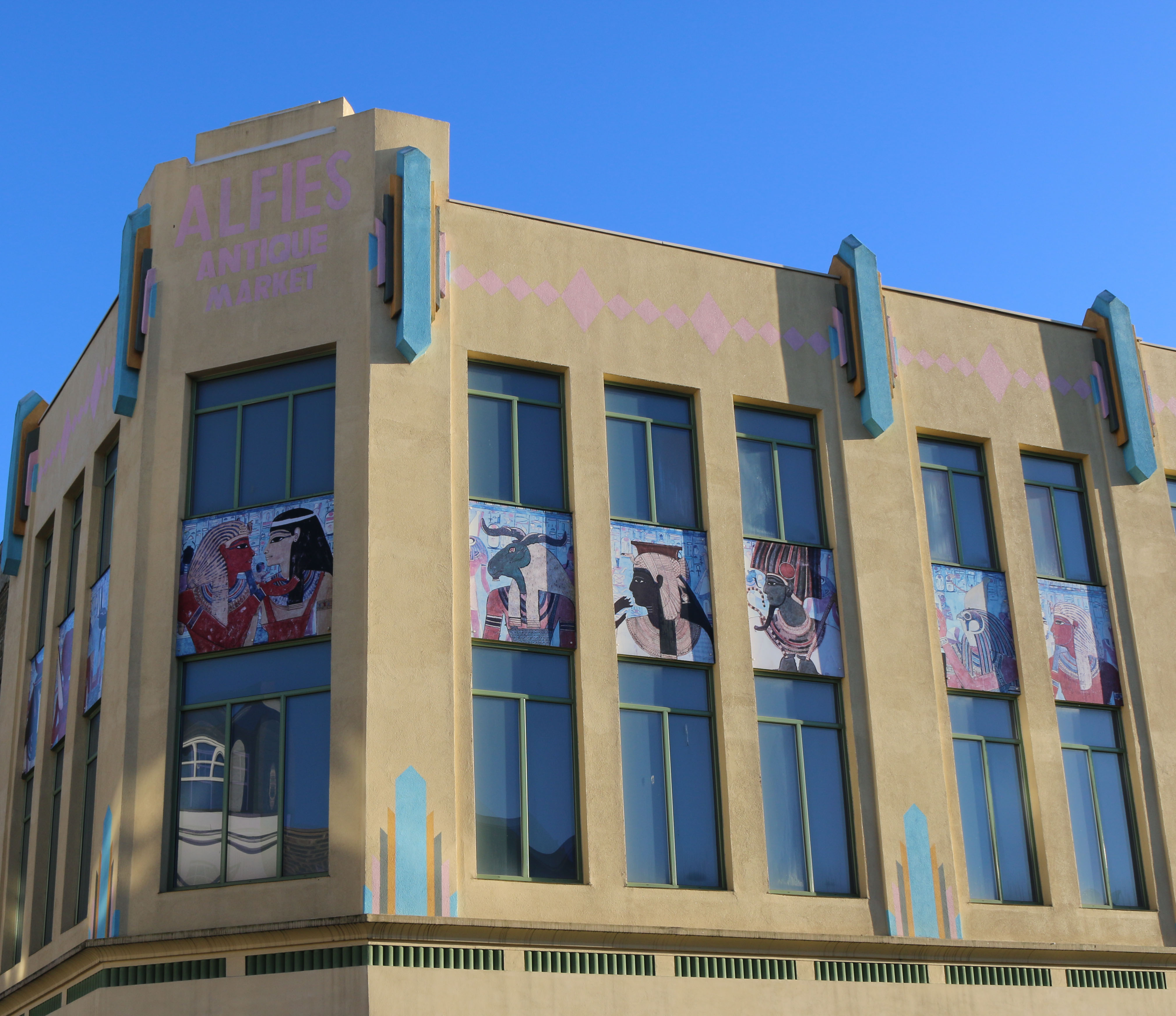
Alfies Antiques Market

The area has a long association with art, artists and theatre. In 1810 the Royal Academy catalogues give sculptor Charles Rossi's address as 21 Lisson Grove, where he had bought a large house. By 1817, Rossi was renting out a section of the house to painter Benjamin Haydon. A blue plaque on the corner of Rossmore Road and Lisson Grove marks the spot and in 2000 author Penelope Hughes-Hallett wrote The Immortal Dinner with the focus on Haydon's dining companions invited to his Lisson Grove abode on 28 December 1817. Haydon's protégé Edwin Landseer lived north on Lisson Grove on the corner of St John's Wood Road from 1825.

The arrival of Dutch painter Lawrence Alma-Tadema at nearby 44, Grove End Road in the late 1870s inspired the naming of one of the Lilestone Estate apartment blocks built in the 1920s as Tadema House. Eastlake House, opposite Tadema House, is possibly named for Charles Eastlake whose Eastlake movement's underlying ethos of simple decorative devices that were affordable and easy to keep clean would have been of interest to those developing social housing in the 20th Century.

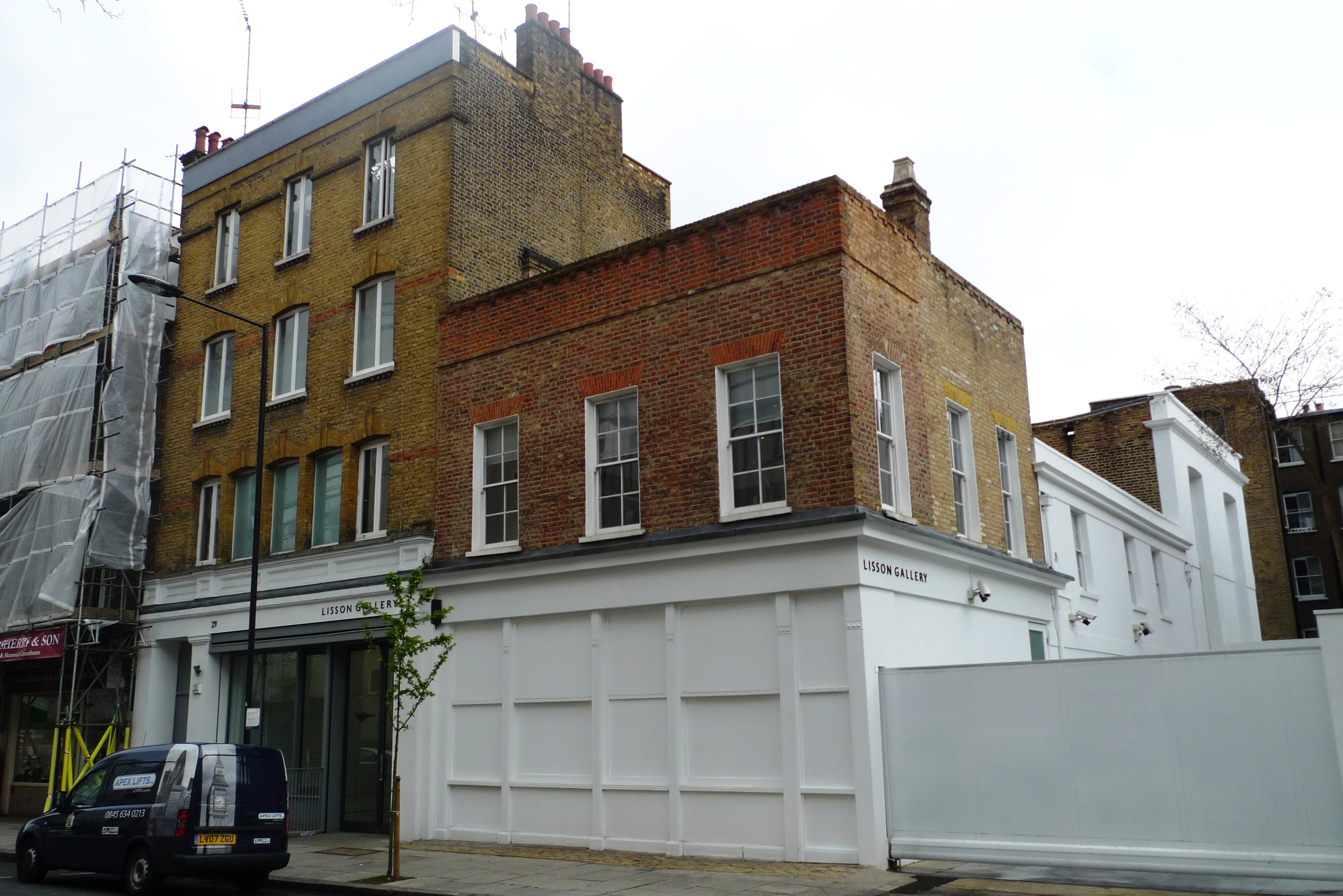
The Lisson Gallery

On Bell Street, the Lisson Gallery, established in 1967 by Nicholas Logsdail, championed the new British sculptors of the 1980s and continues to show new and established artists, with expanded premises further along Bell Street. Mark Jason Gallery at No. 1 Bell Street specialises in promoting contemporary British and international artists.

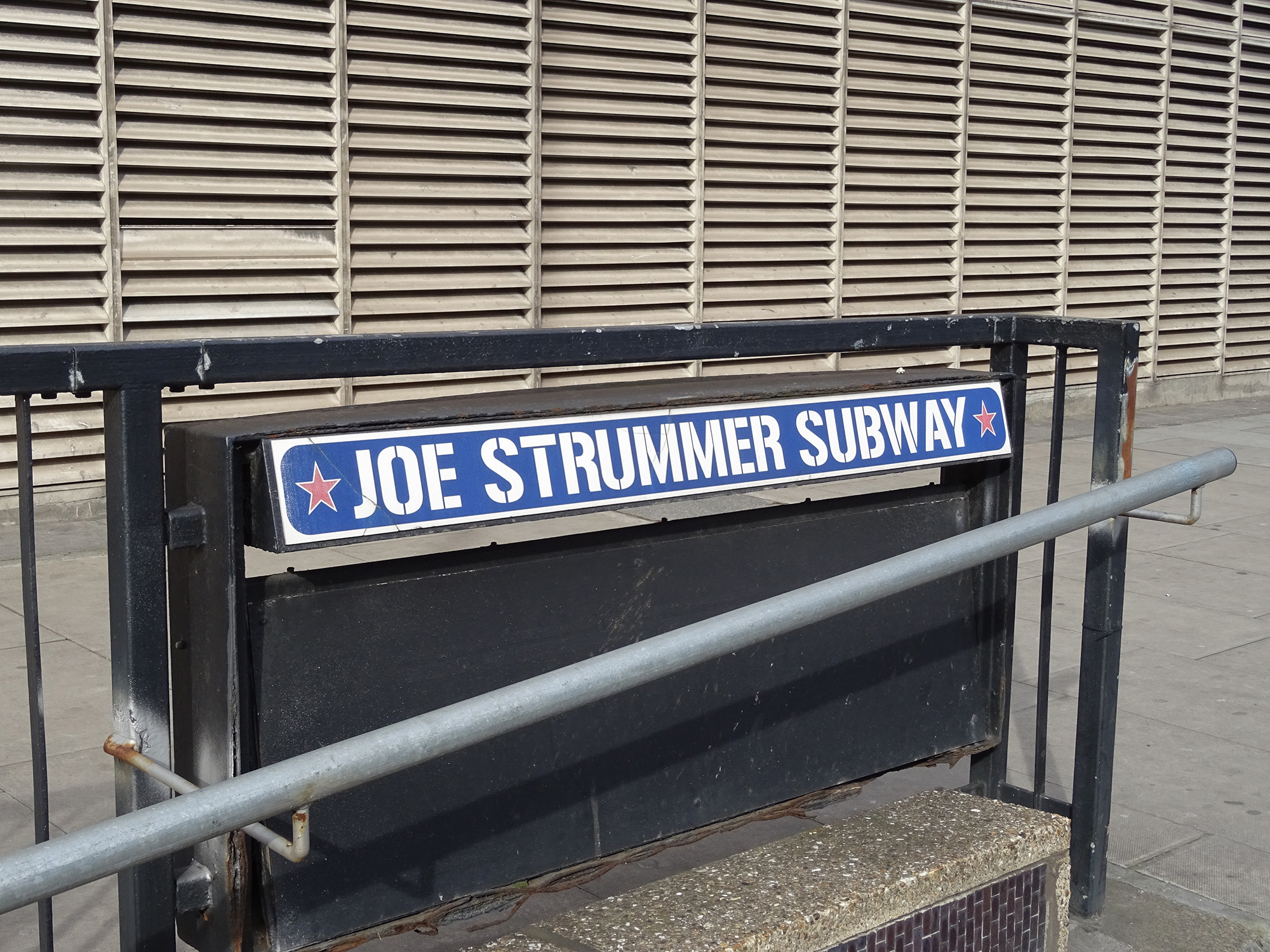
The Joe Strummer Subway.

In 2006 the Subway Gallery arrived in the Joe Strummer Subway which runs under the Marylebone Road. Conceived by artist Robert Gordon McHarg III, the space itself is a 1960s kiosk with glass walls which creates a unique showcase for art, interacting naturally with passers by, visitors and the local community.

The Show Room is on Penfold Street, next to the main Aeroworks factory. The Show Room is a non-profit space for contemporary art that is focused on a collaborative and process-driven approach to production, be that artwork, exhibitions, discussions, publications, knowledge and relationships.

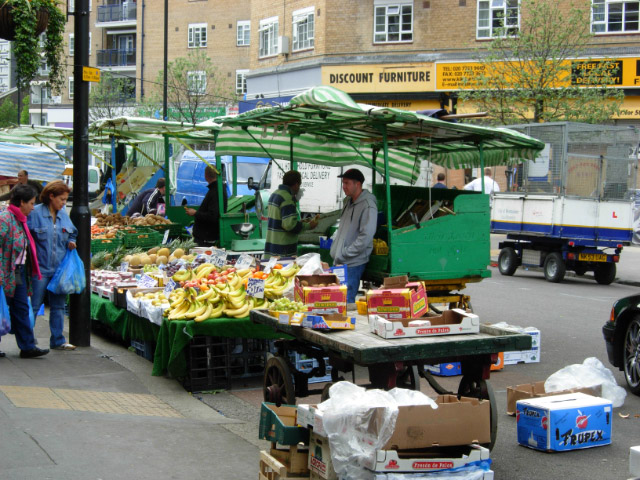
Church Street Market

Church Street runs parallel to St John's Wood Road and plays host to a varied market Mondays–Saturdays, 8am–6pm selling fruit and vegetables, clothes, and bags amongst other items. Towards the Lisson Grove end of Church Street is Alfies Antique Market, London's largest indoor market for antiques, collectables, vintage, and 20th century design is in the former Jordans Department Store, decorated with an Egyptian art deco theme similar to the Aeroworks – the indoor market, "houses more than 200 permanent stall holders and covers in excess of 35,000 sq ft of shop space on five floors." Opened in 1976 by Bennie Gray, in the then derelict department store, the Antiques Market has since spawned twenty or so individual shops at the Lisson Grove end of Church Street specialising in mainly 20th-century art and collectables

=== Theatres and music halls ===
The Metropolitan Music Hall, re-launched with great refurbishment and extended capacity in 1867, was at 267, Edgware Road, opposite Edgware Road (Bakerloo) tube station entrance/exit and Bell Street. Paddington Green police station stands here instead, having moved to make way for the Marylebone flyover.

The Royal West London Theatre was on Church Street, a commemorative plaque above the Church Street Library marking its place. From 1904 onwards Charlie Chaplin trod the boards as a teenager.

Currently Lisson Grove has two theatres.

The Cockpit Theatre on Gateforth Street is a purpose built fringe theatre venue promoting "Theatre of Ideas and ensemble working. Its regular classes and workshops, comfortable bar and friendly team enable this creative hub to support performers, the industry, diverse audiences, the local community and free radicals alike."

The Schmidt hammer lassen-designed City of Westminster College at 25 Paddington Green contains the Siddons Theatre, named for the much acclaimed 18th century tragedienne Sarah Siddons, buried at St Mary on Paddington Green.

== Architectural landmarks ==
- 1897-built public house Crocker's Folly (protected and recognised in the initial category)
- Fisherton Estate Conservation Area
- In 1983, Jeremy Dixon (later of Dixon Jones' fame with fellow architect Edward Jones) designed a series of terrace houses on Ashmill Street.
- Between Hatton Street and Penfold Street the old Spitfire Palmers Aeroworks Factory in operation from 1912 – 1984 manufacturing aircraft components including stand outs as a white Egyptian Art Deco landmark, the elevation facing onto Penfold Street having formerly been a furniture store. This was redeveloped by Terry Farrell in 1985-8 and includes their architectural practice. Next to the Aeroworks, another of the lower buildings now houses The Show Room.

== Local facilities ==
=== Places of worship ===
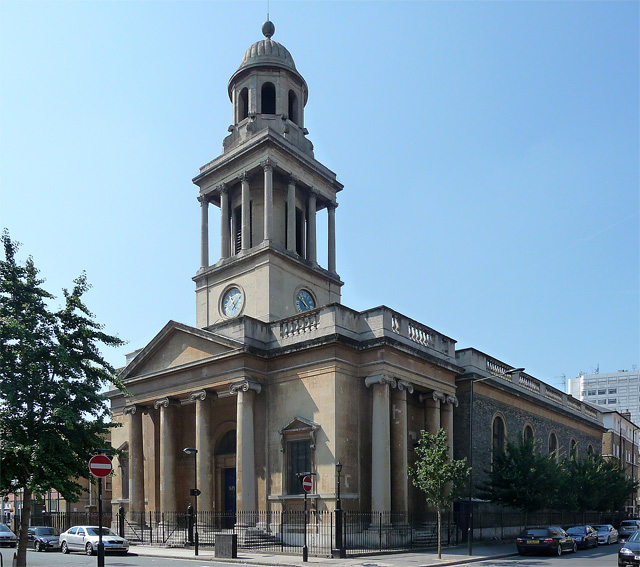
Christ Church, now a sports centre

The Anglican parish church for most of the area is St Paul's Marylebone in Rossmore Road. The former church of Christ Church, Marylebone, designed by Thomas Hardwick in 1822–24 closed in 1977. The parish merged with St Paul's and building is now a leisure facility.

The Anglican church of St Cyprian's, Clarence Gate in Glentworth Street was the first church designed by celebrated architect Ninian Comper. According to Ian Nairn it has the most joyful church interior in London.

The Roman Catholic church of Our Lady's, Lisson Grove stands close to the Northern end of Lisson Grove, and is administered under the wider Roman Catholic Parish of Marylebone. The church was built in 1836, making it one of the first Catholic churches in London to be built after the Roman Catholic Relief Act 1829. It hosts the Lisson Grove Choir, which specialises in chant and renaissance polyphony.

=== Parks and playgrounds ===
- Broadley Street Gardens
- Fisherton Street Estate Playground

=== Education ===
There a number of nurseries in Lisson Grove, two run by London Early Years Foundation (LEYF) at Luton Street and Lisson Green.

Primary schools are St. Edward's Catholic Primary School, Gateway Academy on Gateforth Street and King Solomon Primary.

Ark King Solomon Academy, an Ark school, was established in 2007 on the site of the former Rutherford School for Boys. The main building of the secondary school is Grade II* listed, designed by Leonard Manasseh and Ian Baker in 1957 and completed in 1960. Mannaseh's style has been described as displaying a digested influence of Le Corbusier with traits including "crispness", glazed or tiled pyramids (see the inverted pyramid on the roof of the school and the Egyptian sculpture garden), window walls with fine black mullions, "assertive" gables, and Baker's bold geometrical masonry forms, and grand symmetry and rhythms. The interior lobby is lined in Carrara marble, with corridors lined with Ruabon tiles. When asked "Why the marble, Mr Manasseh?" he was reported as saying "Because it's boy-proof."

=== Historic public houses ===
- The Brazen Head (now flats): Not a particularly popular name for a public house, this was named for the magical artefact, a speaking brass head, 13th century Friar Roger Bacon created, and the subject of legend circulating in the 16th century. The most famous Brazen Head features in James Joyce's Ulysses.
- The Green Man (corner of Bell Street and Edgware Road, W2): The legend is that the pub is named for a herbalist had lived on the site of the pub, due to the nearby spring which had curative properties. Noted for the eye lotion produced from the spring water, all subsequent leaseholders were obliged to sign a clause requiring them to offer the eye lotion for free on request, in his memory. As recently as 1954 Stanley Coleman wrote in his 'Treasury of Folklore: London' "that you may ask [at the bar] for eye lotion and the publican will measure you out an ounce or two" though it no longer came from the well in the cellar which had dried up when Edgware Road Tube station had been built on the site.

== Transport ==
=== Tube stations ===
The nearest London Underground stations are Baker Street, Edgware Road (Bakerloo line), Edgware Road (Circle, District and Hammersmith & City lines), Paddington station, Warwick Avenue and Marylebone.

=== Bus routes ===
Bus routes serving the road Lisson Grove are 139 (West Hampstead to Waterloo via Trafalgar Square), 189 (Brent Cross to Oxford Street).

Edgware Road bus stops for Lisson Grove are served by bus routes 16, 6, 98, 414.

== In literature ==
In Pygmalion, the leading character Eliza Doolittle was partly inspired by a child prostitution scandal in Lisson Grove and the West End, and Higgins claimed to be able to pinpoint her way of speaking to Lisson Grove.

== See also ==
- Street names of Lisson Grove
