= The Polecats =

English rockabilly band

- Also known as: Cult Heroes
- Origin: London, England
- Genre: Rockabilly
- Years active: 1977–1989
- Labels: Nervous; Mercury
- Past members: Tim Worman; Boz Boorer; Phil Bloomberg; Chris Hawkes

The Polecats are an English rockabilly band formed at the end of the 1970s.

== Career ==
The band formed in 1977 in north London. The original line-up, who played under the name "Cult Heroes", was Tim Worman (a.k.a. Tim Polecat, vocalist), Martin "Boz" Boorer (guitarist and vocalist), Phil Bloomberg (bassist), and Chris Hawkes (drummer). Finding difficulty persuading promoters to book them on the rockabilly circuit with a name sounding "too punk", they adopted Hawkes' suggested band name, the Polecats. Hawkes was later replaced by Neil Rooney, who was subsequently replaced by John Buck. The Polecats played rockabilly with a "punk sense of anarchy and helped revive the genre for a new generation in the early '80s."

The band were first signed by the fledgling British rockabilly record label Nervous Records, and recorded their first single "Rockabilly Guy" at guitarist Alan Warner's "Lane Studios" in 1979. Formerly with the "Foundations" band, Warner toured and recorded with the Polecats for about a year.

In 1980, the band signed to Mercury Records, and released their most successful LP, Polecats Are Go!. They had UK chart success with the David Bowie cover "John, I'm Only Dancing", a reworking of "Rockabilly Guy", and another cover version of the T-Rex (Marc Bolan) song "Jeepster". In 1983, they hit the charts in the United States with their song "Make a Circuit with Me". John Buck replaced Neil Rooney as drummer in 1982.

Two of their songs were on the soundtrack to the 1986 film Joey.

Boz Boorer left the group to work as a guitarist, musical director and co-songwriter with Morrissey, but led a Polecats reunion in 1989, which produced a live album and a new studio set. Tim Polecat moved to Los Angeles, California and formed the band 13 Cats, with drummer Slim Jim of the Stray Cats, stand-up bassist Smutty Smiff of the Rockats, and guitarist Danny B. Harvey of the Swing Cats. Musically, Tim Polecat also continues to work as a film composer and solo singer-songwriter.

In November 2006, frontman Jarvis Cocker of the British band Pulp, along with bassist Steve Mackey, released the compilation album The Trip, which featured tracks by artists as varied as the Fall, Gene Pitney, the Beach Boys, the Everly Brothers, Dion, Sonny Bono plus the Polecats cover of David Bowie's "John, I'm Only Dancing".

In the Disney Pixar film WALL-E, advertisers used the Polecats' 1983 hit song "Make a Circuit with Me" in their television trailers for the film. In 2010, the U.S. broadcaster TBS used "Make a Circuit with Me" in two episodes of the TV series Glory Daze.

On August 26, 2024, Boz Boorer released an album on Bandcamp called "Morrissey Reimagined" which was a tribute to Morrissey's greatest hits. This was a reunion of sorts for the founders of the Polecats. Tim Worman sang vocals on one track, "Pregnant for the Last Time," and all instruments and programming on the track were done by Boorer.

== Personnel ==
- Tim 'Polecat' Worman – lead vocals, guitar
- Martin 'Boz' Boorer – vocals, lead guitar, saxophone, piano
- Chris Hawkes/Neil Rooney/John Buck – drums
- Phil Bloomberg – slap bass

== Discography ==
=== Albums ===
- Polecats Are Go! (1981) – Mercury
- Live in Hamburg 1981 – Maybee Crayzee
- Cult Heroes (1984) – Nervous Records
- Live and Rockin' (1989) – Link
- The Polecats Won't Die (1989) – Vinyl Japan
- Virtual Rockabilly: Tim Polecat (1994) – Nervous Records
- The Polecats Won't Die (1996) – Jappin' & Rockin'
- Nine (1997) – Jappin' & Rockin'
- Pink Noise (1999) – Rock-It
- The Best of the Polecats (2000) – Cleopatra Records
- Rockabilly Guys: The Best of the Polecats (2001) – Raucous Records
- Between the Polecats: Boz Boorer (2001) – Raucous Records UK
- Polecats Are Go! (2004 reissue with bonus tracks) – Anagram Records
- The Best of the Polecats (with bonus track "Desire") (2005) – Cleopatra Records
- Not Nervous! Rare 1980 Demos Remastered (2006) – NV Records
- Rockabilly Cats (2008) – Cleopatra Records

=== EPs ===
- John, I'm Only Dancing – Mercury
- Jeepster – Mercury
- Make a Circuit with Me (1983) – Mercury US
- Live in Hamburg – NV Records

=== Singles ===
- "Rockabilly Guy" (1979), Nervous Records
- "John I'm Only Dancing" / "Big Green Car" (1981), Mercury – UK No. 35
- "Rockabilly Guy" (1981), Mercury – UK No. 35
- "Jeepster" / "Marie [sic] Celeste" (1981), Mercury – UK No. 53
- "Make a Circuit with Me" (1983), Mercury – UK No. 76
