= Smutty Smiff =

British musician

Smutty Smiff (born 5 July 1959 in East London, England), also known as Stephen Dennis Smith, is a British musician best known as one of the founding members of rockabilly punk band Levi and the Rockats, who were famously discovered by and associated with photographer Leee Black Childers, tour manager of David Bowie, Johnny Thunders and the Heartbreakers, and Iggy Pop, both as a solo act and with the Stooges.

== Biography ==
By the beginning of 1977, Childers had recently finished his commitments on the controversial and tumultuous Anarchy Tour, a tour headlined by the Sex Pistols, the Clash and Johnny Thunders and the Heartbreakers, with additional support from the Damned and Siouxsie and the Banshees at select gigs. Following the conclusion of the tour, Levi Dexter met Childers at a rockabilly concert in London, where Childers had expressed his interest in discovering a fresh musical project. Following this meeting, Dexter and Smutty Smiff decided to form a band together, despite Smiff having had no prior musical training. One week later, Childers purchased a double bass for Smiff, and the band's first gig was subsequently booked in Max's Kansas City.

During this time, as the band was entering into social circles with local artists, musicians and photographers, Smiff became a model and a friend to photographers such as Andy Warhol, Mick Rock, Bob Gruen, Janette Beckman, and Robert Mapplethorpe, and did runway shows for Betsey Johnson and Stephen Sprouse, as well as photo sessions for the German and Italian editions of Vogue. Smiff discussed his experiences with Warhol and The Factory in his book Smutty: The Only Essex Boy In Warhol's Factory, and had also released another book prior to this named Kats, Tats, Cars and Creepers. Additionally, Smiff has worked in film, co-writing two songs for the John Travolta movie, the General's Daughter 's soundtrack, and appeared in Where the Boys Are.

Throughout his time with The Rockats, he opened for and toured with acts including Tina Turner, the Clash, David Bowie, Kiss, the Pretenders, Bob Dylan, the Go-Go's, Ramones, Talking Heads, and Joan Jett among others.

In 1979, Dexter decided to quit the band and go solo after a gig at the Whisky a Go Go. Smiff decided at the time to continue the band with Dibbs Preston as lead singer and rebranded simply as "The Rockats". After relocating from London to New York, The Rockats signed with Chris Blackwell and released the album Rockats: Live at the Ritz, with an album cover shot by Mick Rock. Introductions to the album were made by Billy Idol.

Following the release of The Rockats' biggest hit "Make That Move" in 1984, and after four months of rehab, Smiff relocated from Arizona to California and formed the Havalinas with Tim Scott McConnell. Their song "High Hopes" was covered by Bruce Springsteen, who in 2014 named his entire album High Hopes.

Smutty Smiff currently lives between Reykjavík, Iceland, where he works at a homeless shelter and was also a long-serving radio host for a rock radio station, and London, England, where he runs a stall at Alfies Antique Market named Wildcat Vintage, which deals in punk and Teddy Boy fashion, and is closely associated with author and Byline Times co-founder Stephen Colegrave's neighbouring stall, which sells autographed prints of photographs by Bob Gruen and Leee Black Childers. He is married to Katrin Rosa Stefansdottir and has two sons.

As of 2026, Smiff is recording his debut album as a solo artist.

== Gear ==
Smutty's fiberglass upright bass, with custom pin striping and his name written across the lower bout, was stolen along with the rest of the Rockats' gear in 1982. In 2021, it was located in a pawn shop in New Jersey. The story of bass was featured in a story in The New York Times. Days after the story of the stolen bass was published, it was returned to Smutty.
