= The Havalinas =

Gypsy-folk-rock band from California

The Havalinas are an American gypsy-folk-rock band from California, formed in 1989 in Los Angeles by Tim Scott McConnell and Stephen Dennis Smith (Smutty Smiff) - former bandmates in Levi and the Rockats, a punk-styled rockabilly group and Charlie "Chalo" Quintana (Social Distortion, Cruzados) on drums and percussion (as well as back up vocals). Tim Scott played guitar and sang vocals as well as Harmonica, Mandolin, Bouzouki, Fiddle, Banjo, Keyboards, and Ukulele. While their first album was critically applauded, it never gained traction on radio perhaps due to its stripped down sound.

Tim Scott had paid his dues in the music business having been a member of the Rockats (a pioneering rockabilly revival group featuring Jerry Nolan (ex-New York Dolls) on drums in 1979. Tim had a solo contract in the 80's and caught a break in the late-80's when the major labels started a bidding war over the Havalinas, described as a raucous roots band who dressed like L.A. outlaws

Tim lives in Norway today and occasionally records using his full name, Tim Scott McConnell, and has lately been performing as Ledfoot.

The band achieved some success and toured with the Beat Farmers, Bob Dylan, Chris Isaak, Tina Turner, and Crowded House.

In 1996 and then again in 2014, Bruce Springsteen covered McConnell's song "High Hopes"
