= Sugar Walls =

1984 single by Sheena Easton

Single by Sheena Easton

from the album A Private Heaven
- B-side: "Straight Talking"
- Released: December 4, 1984 (US)
- Recorded: 20–21 January 1984
- Genre: Dance-pop; funk; R&B
- Length: 4:01
- Label: EMI
- Songwriter: Alexander Nevermind
- Producers: Greg Mathieson; Prince

Sheena Easton singles chronology
"Strut" (1984)	"Sugar Walls" (1984)	"Swear" (1985)

"Sugar Walls" is a song by the Scottish singer Sheena Easton. It was released as the fourth single overall from her fifth studio album, A Private Heaven (1984). Despite stalling at number 95 in the United Kingdom, it became another hit for Easton in the United States, peaking at number nine on the Billboard Hot 100 chart. It also reached number three on the Billboard Hot Black Singles chart and number one on both the Billboard Dance/Disco Club Play and 12-inch Singles Sales charts. The music was credited to Alexander Nevermind, a pseudonym used by Prince.

"Sugar Walls" was given a special release on 13 April 2019 as a 12-inch picture disc pressed by RT Industries (Razor & Tie) for 2019 National Record Store Day.

== Background ==
The song title is presumed to be a euphemism for the lining of a vagina, and the general content was considered suggestive enough to qualify the song for the Filthy Fifteen. Although Easton's music video for "Sugar Walls" did not feature any controversial visual content, some broadcasters refused the video airplay because of the sexual imagery of the song's lyrics. Televangelist Jimmy Swaggart and Tipper Gore's PMRC criticised the song when it was first released.

Prince came up with the track after having been introduced to Sheena Easton through their engineer, David Leonard. Easton was a fan of Prince, and asked Leonard to see if Prince would be willing to work with her after watching her performance on The Tonight Show Starring Johnny Carson. At the time, Prince was working on mixing "Ice Cream Castle" for the Time, but once Leonard told him of Easton, Prince watched her performance of "Hard to Say It's Over" on the show and liked it.

Prince spent the next day recording the instrumental track and a guide vocal to send to Easton. Prince then supervised the recording of her vocals, and they both enjoyed working together. Their work on this track led to further collaborations on Prince's singles "U Got the Look" and "The Arms of Orion".

== Personnel ==
Personnel are sourced from Duane Tudahl.

- Sheena Easton – lead and backing vocals
- Prince – backing vocals, synthesizers, electric guitar, Linn LM-1

== Charts ==
=== Weekly charts ===
Weekly chart performance for "Sugar Walls"
Chart (1985)	Peak position
Australia (Kent Music Report)	87
Canada Retail Singles (The Record)	20
Canada Top Singles (RPM)	27
New Zealand (Recorded Music NZ)	30
UK Singles (Official Charts)	95
US Billboard Hot 100	9
US 12-inch Singles Sales (Billboard)	1
US Hot Black Singles (Billboard)	3
US Dance/Disco Club Play (Billboard)	1
US Cash Box Top 100	5
West Germany (GfK)	57

=== Year-end charts ===
Year-end chart performance for "Sugar Walls"
Chart (1985)	Rank
US Billboard Hot 100	100
US 12-inch Singles Sales (Billboard)	19
US Dance/Disco Club Play (Billboard)	16
US Cash Box Top 100	48

== In popular culture ==
- The song was covered by Rachel Lester during her infamous audition on the fourth series of The X Factor in 2007.
- 'Sugar Walls' was also the name of Linda La Hughes's celebrity sister in the series Gimme, Gimme, Gimme. The character was played by Elaine Lordan

== See also ==
- List of number-one dance singles of 1985 (U.S.)
