= Swear (Tim Scott McConnell song) =

Single by Sheena Easton

from the album A Private Heaven
- B-side: "Fallen Angels"
- Released: 1985
- Genre: Pop
- Length: 3:43
- Label: EMI, RT Industries (current)
- Songwriter: Tim Scott
- Producer: Greg Mathieson

Sheena Easton singles chronology
"Sugar Walls" (1984)	"Swear" (1985)	"Do It for Love" (1985)

"Swear" is a 1980s pop song by Tim Scott McConnell, released by Sire Records in 1983. It was covered by Sheena Easton for her Platinum selling 1984 album A Private Heaven and released as its third single in the US, reaching number 80 on the Billboard Hot 100 in 1985.

== Background ==
The music video to promote the song was a campy/tongue-in-cheek music video of a hippy-based pagan/black mass set in a church. The stylized music video is seemingly a parody of late 1960s to early 1970s hippy horror movies.

McConnell would later comment on the song: "This was my young and confused record...I wrote the songs over a couple of weeks on a little Casio keyboard...Sire heard it and offered me a deal...no use apologising for such a thing...my mistake... the good part of it was working with Richard Gottehrer ...really took me under his wing...shame we were working on the wrong kind of music.."

== Cover versions ==
"Swear" was covered by Sheena Easton for her 1984 album A Private Heaven. It reached number 80 on the Billboard Hot 100 chart the following year.

== Charts ==
Chart performance for "Swear" by Tim Scott
Chart (1983)	Peak position
Australia (Kent Music Report)	44

Chart performance for "Swear" by Sheena Easton
Chart (1985)	Peak position
US Billboard Hot 100	80
