= A Private Heaven =

Studio album by Sheena Easton
- Released: 21 September 1984
- Recorded: 1983–1984
- Studios: The Sound Factory and Sunset Sound (Hollywood, California)
- Genres: Dance-pop; funk
- Length: 39:54
- Label: EMI America
- Producer: Greg Mathieson

Sheena Easton chronology
Best Kept Secret (1983)	A Private Heaven (1984)	Todo Me Recuerda a Ti (1984)

Singles from A Private Heaven
- 1. "Strut" Released: August 1984 (US); 2. "Hungry Eyes" Released: September 1984 (Japan); 3. "Back in the City" Released: October 1984 (UK); 4. "Sugar Walls" Released: December 1984 (US); 5. "Swear" Released: March 1985 (US)

A Private Heaven is the fifth studio album by Scottish singer Sheena Easton, released on 21 September 1984 by EMI America Records. The album featured two Billboard Hot 100 Top 10 singles – the lead single "Strut" and the controversial "Sugar Walls", whilst "Swear", a third single, peaked at No. 80.

Recognised as Easton's most successful studio album in the United States where it peaked at No. 15 on the US Billboard 200, it sold over one million copies in the United States, earning a gold and platinum certification from the RIAA. In Canada, the album also went platinum. The tour that year featured Bruce Hornsby on keyboards in the live band.

== Background ==
The album marked a conscious effort by Easton to change her image to that of a sexy pop singer after cultivating a "sweet and innocent" image since the launch of her career five years earlier. The sexually charged "Strut" - co-written by Charlie Dore - became Easton's biggest solo hit in the US since 1981's "For Your Eyes Only". Easton collaborated with Prince on the controversial track "Sugar Walls", written by Prince under the pseudonym Alexander Nevermind. The track and its accompanying video were banned in some regions due to its sexually risqué lyrics and was one of several songs cited by Tipper Gore on her Filthy Fifteen list in her efforts to introduce mandatory warning labeling of explicit musical albums. Easton's musical association with Prince continued for the next few years, with him writing "Eternity" for her eighth studio album, No Sound But a Heart (1987) and Easton later featuring on Prince's singles "U Got the Look" in 1987 and "The Arms of Orion" in 1989.

The album also includes cover versions of Tim Scott's new wave track "Swear" and Joan Armatrading's 1976 classic "Love and Affection". Converse to the album's success in America, in the UK, it was her first studio album not to chart, and none of the singles released made the official Top 75.

== Legacy ==
In 2000, One Way Records released a remastered version of A Private Heaven with bonus tracks and B-sides. On 23 February 2013, Edsel Records (UK) reissued Easton's A Private Heaven and its follow-up studio album Do You (1985) on two CDs remastered with bonus tracks. On 24 November 2014, the album was included in a box set in the UK with all of her first five albums with EMI through Warner Music Group. A 2CD deluxe edition of A Private Heaven, remastered from the original master tapes for the first time with 21 bonus tracks, including 12 previously unreleased tracks, along with 12" mixes and B-sides, was released on 25 February 2022 by Cherry Pop/RT Industries.

On 31 May 2024 RT Industries and Cherry Pop Records released a 40th Anniversary Edition of the album featuring 12" mixes and three previously unreleased tracks on a red vinyl double LP set. In 2025 RT Industries released "A Private Heaven" in (Ultimate Edition) format for streaming services.

== Critical reception ==
Professional ratings
Review scores
Source	Rating
AllMusic	link

Cashbox magazine reviewed the album in October 1984, writing that with "Virtually unlimited talent, Sheena Easton is at her absolute best", describing the album as "dazzling" and featuring "solid, punchy, techno-pop production with dramatic ballads".

== Chart performance ==
The album spent 35 weeks on the US Billboard album charts and reached its peak position of No. 15 in early February 1985.

== Track listing ==
Side one

1. "Strut" (Charlie Dore, Julian Littman) – 4:05
2. "Sugar Walls" (Alexander Nevermind) – 4:01
3. "Hungry Eyes" (Greg Mathieson, Trevor Veitch) – 3:42
4. "Hard to Say It's Over" (Adrienne Anderson, Gino Cunico, Tom Saviano) – 4:24
5. "Swear" (Tim Scott) – 3:43

Side two

6. "Love and Affection" (Joan Armatrading) – 4:06
7. "Back in the City" (Greg Mathieson, Lee Ritenour, Trevor Veitch) – 3:46
8. "You Make Me Nervous" (Mark Holding, Robbie Nevil, Duncan Pain) – 3:53
9. "All by Myself" (Steve Lukather, Trevor Veitch) – 4:24
10. "Double Standard" (Steve Kipner, Ben Petterson) – 3:50

=== 2022 2CD deluxe version bonus tracks ===
The 12” Mixes

1. "Strut" (Dance Mix)
2. "Sugar Walls" (Dance Mix)
3. "Swear" (Dance Mix)
4. "Strut" (Dub Mix)
5. "Sugar Walls" (Red Mix)
6. "Swear" (Dub Mix)

The B-Sides

1. "Letters from the Road"
2. "Straight Talking"
3. "Fallen Angels"

The Studio Sessions (previously unreleased)

1. "Have You Ever Been in Love"
2. "Hungry Eyes" (alternate version)
3. "Hard to Say It's Over" (alternate version)
4. "Sugar Walls" (Long 'Roman' Version)

The Instrumental Mixes (previously unreleased)

1. "Strut" (instrumental mix)
2. "Love and Affection" (instrumental mix)
3. "Hungry Eyes" (instrumental mix)
4. "All by Myself" (instrumental mix)
5. "Back in the City" (instrumental mix)
6. "Hard to Say It's Over" (instrumental mix)
7. "Straight Talking" (instrumental mix)
8. "In It to Win It" (instrumental mix)

== Personnel ==
Credits are adapted from the A Private Heaven liner notes except where noted.

- Sheena Easton – lead vocals, backing vocals
- Michael Boddicker – keyboards
- Greg Mathieson – keyboards
- Michael Landau – guitars
- Lee Ritenour – guitars
- Steve Lukather – all guitars (9)
- Abraham Laboriel – bass
- Carlos Vega – drums
- Lenny Castro – percussion, bongos
- Gary Herbig – saxophones
- Larry Williams – saxophones
- Bill Reichenbach Jr. – trombone
- Gary Grant – trumpet
- Jerry Hey – trumpet, horn arrangements
- Trevor Veitch – music contractor
- Steve George – backing vocals
- Tom Kelly – backing vocals
- Richard Page – backing vocals
- Devo – backing vocals
- Prince – synthesizers (2), electric guitar (2), Linn LM-1 (2)

=== Production ===
- Greg Mathieson – producer, arrangements
- David Leonard – recording, mixing
- Wally Traugott – mastering at Capitol Mastering (Hollywood, California)
- Ria Lewerke – art direction
- Sue Reilly – logo design
- Brian Aris – photography
- Moshe Brakha – background photography
- Sue Mann – make-up
- Barron Matalon – hair stylist
- Harriet Wasserman – management

== Charts ==
Chart performance for A Private Heaven
Chart (1984–1985)	Peak position
Argentina (CAPIF)	5
Australian Albums (Kent Music Report)	88
Canada Top Albums/CDs (RPM)	32
New Zealand Albums (RMNZ)	26
US Billboard 200	15

Chart performance for A Private Heaven
Chart (2022)	Peak position
Scottish Albums (OCC)	66

== Certifications ==
Certifications for A Private Heaven
Region	Certification	Certified units/sales
Canada (Music Canada)	Platinum	100,000^{^}
United States (RIAA)	Platinum	1,000,000^{^}
^{^} Shipments figures based on certification alone.
