= Strut (Sheena Easton song) =

1984 single by Sheena Easton

Single by Sheena Easton

from the album A Private Heaven
- B-side: "Letters from the Road"
- Released: August 7, 1984
- Length: 3:59
- Label: EMI; RT Industries
- Songwriters: Charlie Dore; Julian Littman
- Producer: Greg Mathieson

Sheena Easton singles chronology
"Back in the City" (1984)	"Strut" (1984)	"Sugar Walls" (1985)

"Strut" is a song by the Scottish singer Sheena Easton, released as the lead single from her fifth studio album, A Private Heaven (1984). It was composed by singer-songwriter Charlie Dore and her longtime songwriting partner Julian Littman. Easton was sent the demo for the song by Christopher Neil, who was Easton's first producer. "Strut" was released by EMI America in August 1984 as the album's lead single and peaked that November at No. 7 on the US Billboard Hot 100. In the UK—where the single was released in November 1984—the track became the first US top-40 single by Easton to completely miss the top 100 of the UK Singles Chart.

== Background ==
While Easton had achieved success with singles over her career, The Philadelphia Inquirer asserted in 1984 that "the old Sheena Easton was running into some identity problems" due to her management not knowing whether to promote her as a rock or pop artist. EMI record executive Dick Williams noted Easton's concerns with being branded as a middle of the road artist, stating, "I think she felt, as did a lot of programmers, that her image was predominantly 'pop adult' and that limited her exposure to radio and television."

After the success of the top-10 single "Telefone (Long Distance Love Affair)", Easton wanted to keep exploring that genre and move away from her image as a ballad singer. She recalled in a 1984 interview that both she and producer Greg Mathieson "wanted to keep it young, spiky and aggressive" for A Private Heaven, stating that Mathieson "fought in my corner to get me songs that normally wouldn't be sent to me, songs with a more adult lyric but a younger feel." Finding such material proved difficult; Easton noted that songs with a harder edge would be first offered to artists like Pat Benatar. She eventually found a suitable single in "Strut": after being sent a demo of the song by her friend and former producer, Christopher Neil. he encouraged her to take the song to Mathieson, who liked it enough to produce the track.

== Reception and accolades ==
It was nominated for Best Pop Vocal Performance, Female at the 27th Grammy Awards. Like its parent album overall, the "Strut" single and accompanying video signaled Easton's shift towards a more sexually suggestive image.

== Charts ==
=== Weekly charts ===
Chart (1984–1985)	Peak position
Argentina (CAPIF)	3
Australia (Kent Music Report)	13
Canada Retail Singles (The Record)	8
Canada Top Singles (RPM)	7
New Zealand (Recorded Music NZ)	8
South Africa (Springbok Radio)	18
US Billboard Hot 100	7
US Dance Club Songs (Billboard)	6
US Cash Box Top 100	4
West Germany (GfK)	21

=== Year-end charts ===
Chart (1984)	Position
Canada Top Singles (RPM)	60
US Cash Box Top 100	37

Chart (1985)	Position
Australia (Kent Music Report)	61
US Billboard Hot 100	46

== Certifications ==
Region	Certification	Certified units/sales
Canada (Music Canada)	Gold	50,000^{^}
^{^} Shipments figures based on certification alone.

== Popular culture ==
In 1986 Easton, dressed as a geisha, performed "Strut" in a Japanese TV commercial for shōchū.
