= The Havalinas (album) =

Studio album by the Havalinas
- Released: February 20, 1990
- Genres: Folk rock, roots rock
- Label: Elektra
- Producer: Don Gehman

The Havalinas chronology
| The Havalinas (1990) | Go North (1991) |

The Havalinas is the debut album by the American band the Havalinas, released on February 20, 1990. They supported it with a North American tour and by opening for Bob Dylan on a European tour. Bruce Springsteen recorded "High Hopes", the first single, for his Blood Brothers EP.

== Production ==
The album was produced by Don Gehman. "Good for Nothin' Rag" decries the destruction inflicted on the Earth by humans. "There Was This Mother" is about the struggles of welfare recipients. "Not Alot to Ask For" is a narrative about a romantic relationship from the woman's point of view. The drummer Charlie Quintana would later say that the album helped him to expand the style and technique with which he played—less bashing, and with a wider variety of rods and brushes and percussive instruments.

== Critical reception ==
Professional ratings
Review scores
| Source | Rating |
|---|---|
| The Boston Phoenix | 2.5/4 stars |
| Calgary Herald | A− |
| The Encyclopedia of Popular Music | 2/5 stars |
| Entertainment Weekly | C− |
| Houston Chronicle | 4.5/5 stars |
| Los Angeles Times | 3/5 stars |
| New York Daily News | 3/4 stars |
| Orlando Sentinel | 4/5 stars |
| Rolling Stone | 3/5 stars |

The Calgary Herald called the album "crisply played folk rock with a blues tinge." The Philadelphia Inquirer praised the production, noting that "the walloping skins whip Tim McConnell's guitar into an intoxicating frenzy" but that the band often falls "into formulaic songwriting or downright imitation." The Orlando Sentinel said that the bandmembers "all stand out in sharp relief, no matter how many instruments are incorporated in the roots-rock arrangements." The Houston Chronicle deemed it "the first great ... roots-rock album of the '90s."

The Los Angeles Times likened the music to "the sentimental spirit and the ramshackle, acousti-rock sound of a street-corner Stones." The Gazette said that "the Havalinas make a joyous noise out of the most basic root elements of rock." Rolling Stone called the Havalinas "one of the best new bands around." Entertainment Weekly panned the "obvious" political rants. The Trouser Press Record Guide labeled the debut "a self-conscious cowboy rock album played on acoustic instruments."

== Track listing ==
| No. | Title | Length |
|---|---|---|
| 1. | "High Hopes" |
| 2. | "Not Alot to Ask For" |
| 3. | "Fill 'Em Up!" |
| 4. | "There Was This Mother" |
| 5. | "Jesus and Johnny" |
| 6. | "Sticks and Stones" |
| 7. | "Don't Feel Bad" |
| 8. | "Good for Nothin' Rag" |
| 9. | "Inexperienced" |
| 10. | "Another Out" |
| 11. | "Why Didn't I?" |
