= Tim Scott McConnell =

American singer-songwriter

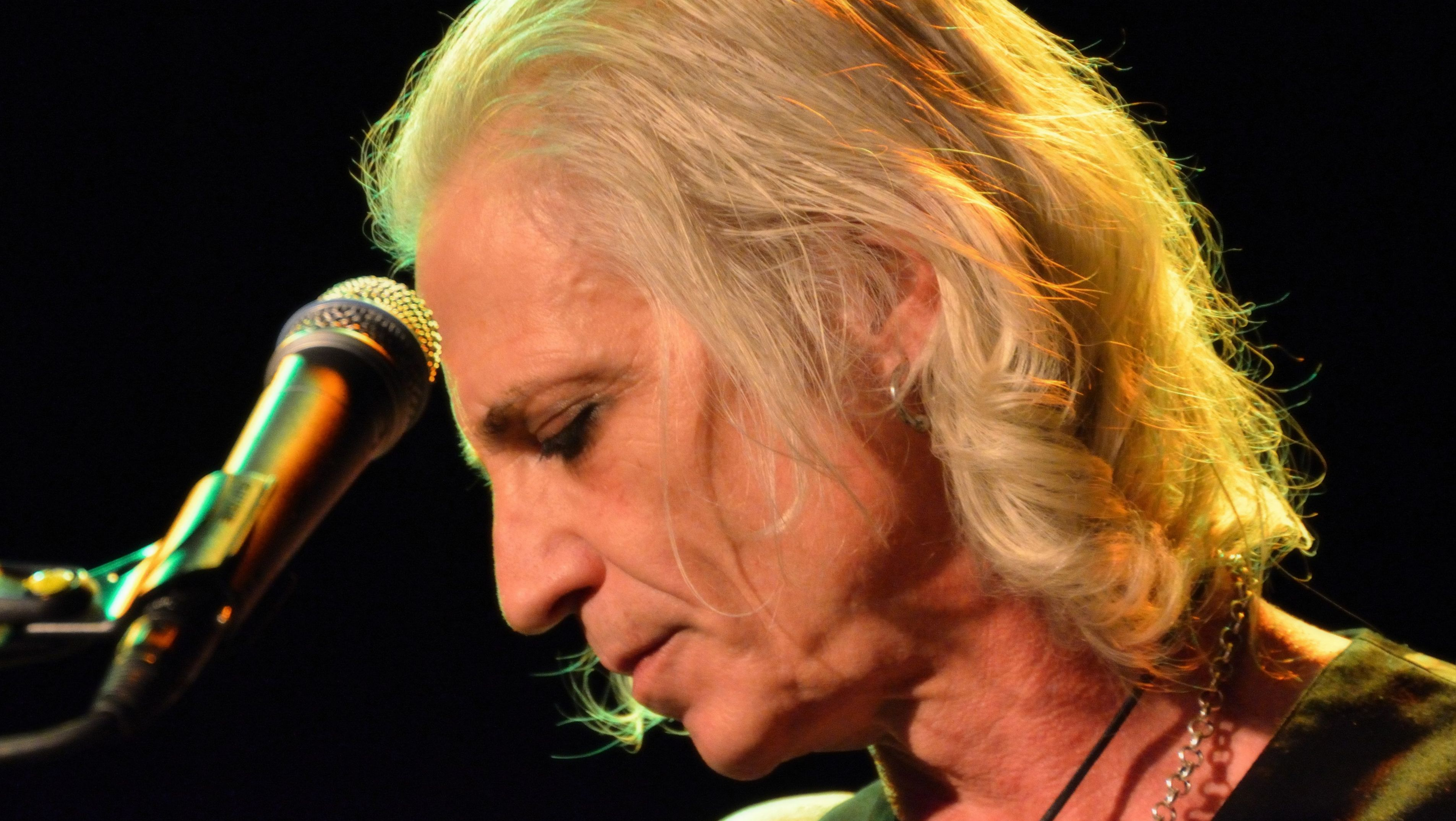
- Live in concert, November 2011

Background information
- Also known as: Ledfoot, Tim Scott
- Born: Tim Scott McConnell; March 25, 1958 (age 68)
- Origin: Florida, United States
- Genres: Rock, folk, blues
- Occupations: Singer, songwriter, guitarist
- Instruments: Vocal, guitar
- Years active: 1975–present
- Labels: Sire, Geffen, Elektra, Warner, Vox

Tim Scott McConnell, also known as Tim Scott and Ledfoot (born March 23, 1958), is an American singer-songwriter and 12-string guitarist who performs since 2007 under the artist name Ledfoot. The artist's repertoire consists solely of self-written songs.

Two of his songs gained international popularity through other artists:

- "Swear" was covered by Sheena Easton for her 1984 album A Private Heaven.
- Bruce Springsteen recorded one of his songs, "High Hopes", on the Blood Brother EP (1996). The song, released by Bruce Springsteen as a single in November 2013, gave the title to his January 2014 studio album.

McConnell started touring at the age of 15. He got his first recording contract with Sire Records in 1982. He then recorded for Geffen on his next record in 1985, called "High Lonesome Sound". McConnell headed the LA-based band The Havalinas. The band recorded one album The Havalinas and a live album called Go North. After the break-up of The Havalinas, McConnell did a series of solo albums and toured with a band. In 2007, he released his first Ledfoot album and started touring in Europe. Since 2010, Ledfoot, has had a close musical relationship with the Norwegian metal guitarist and studio owner Ronni Le Tekrø from the Norwegian hard rock band TNT that culminated in the 2020 duo album A Death Divine.

== Discography ==
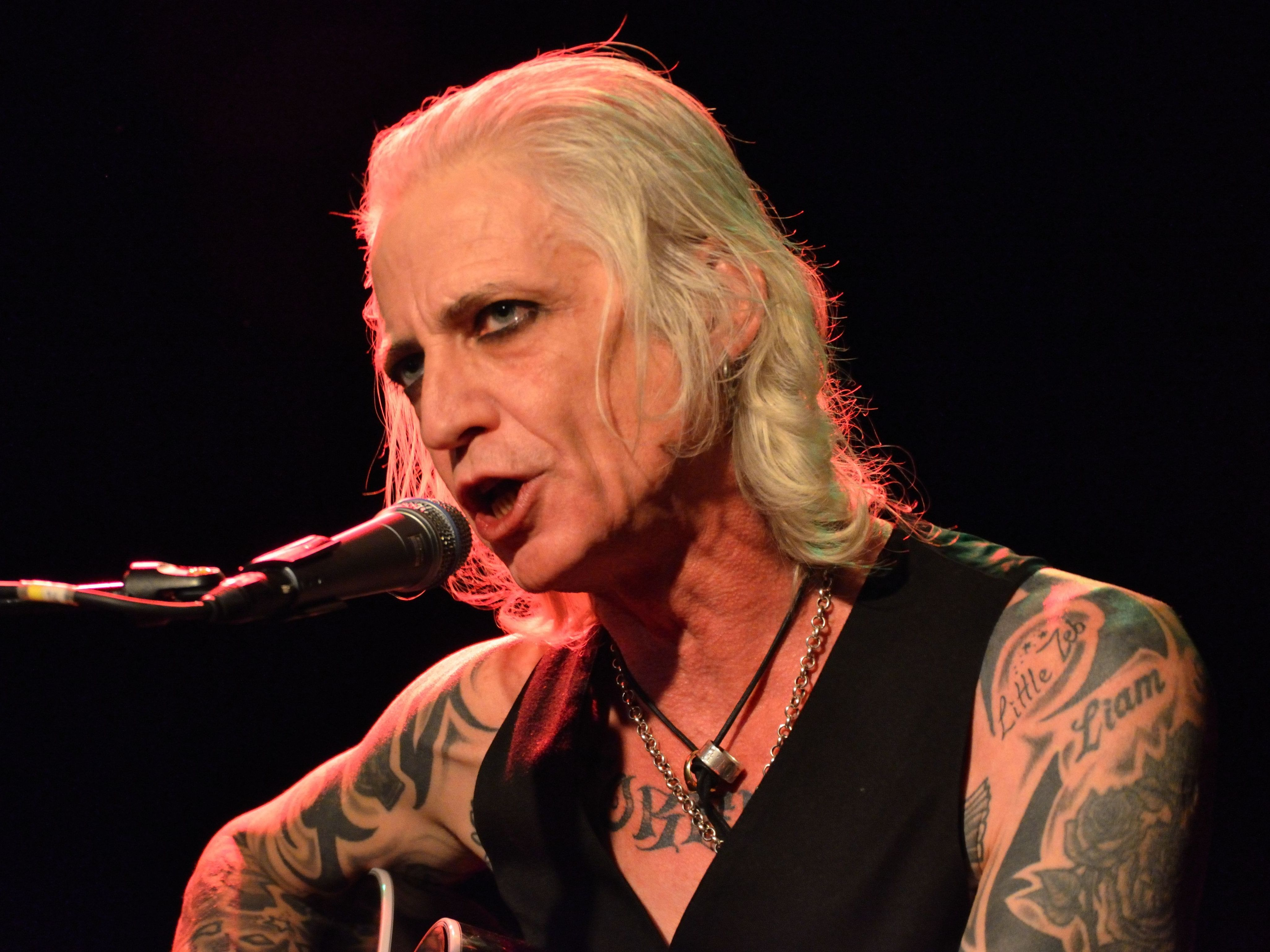
Ledfoot Gothic Blues

- 1981: The Rockats Live at the Ritz – Island Records
- 1983: Tim Scott Swear – Sire Records
- 1985: Tim Scott High Lonesome Sound – Geffen
- 1990: The Havalinas The Havalinas – Elektra
- 1991: The Havalinas Go North – Mo Records
- 1995: Tim Scott Deceivers & Believers – Warner Music
- 1997: Tim Scott Everywhere I´ve Been – Waterfall Records
- 2002: The MoMac Trio MoMac Trio – Farmen
- 2005: Tim Scott 13 songs – Farmen
- 2007: Ledfoot Devils songbook – Grappa/ Blue Mood Records
- 2009: Ledfoot Damned – Vox Records
- 2011: Ledfoot Gothic Blues – Vox Records
- 2019: Ledfoot White Crow – TBC Records
- 2020: Ledfoot & Ronni Le Tekrø A Death Divine – TBC Records
- 2021: Ledfoot Black Valley – TBC Records
- 2022: Ledfoot Coffin Nails – TBC Records
- 2023: Ledfoot Songs from EXIT – TBC Records
- 2024: Ledfoot Outsiders – TBC Records

== Most popular singles ==
- "High Hopes" (High Lonesome Sound & The Havalinas)
- "Swear" (Swear) AUS #44
- "Wicked State of Mind (Damned)
- "Purgatory Road" (Damned)
- "Diggin My Own Grave" (Devils Songbook)
