= Edgware Road tube station (Bakerloo line) =

London Underground station on the Bakerloo line

Edgware Road
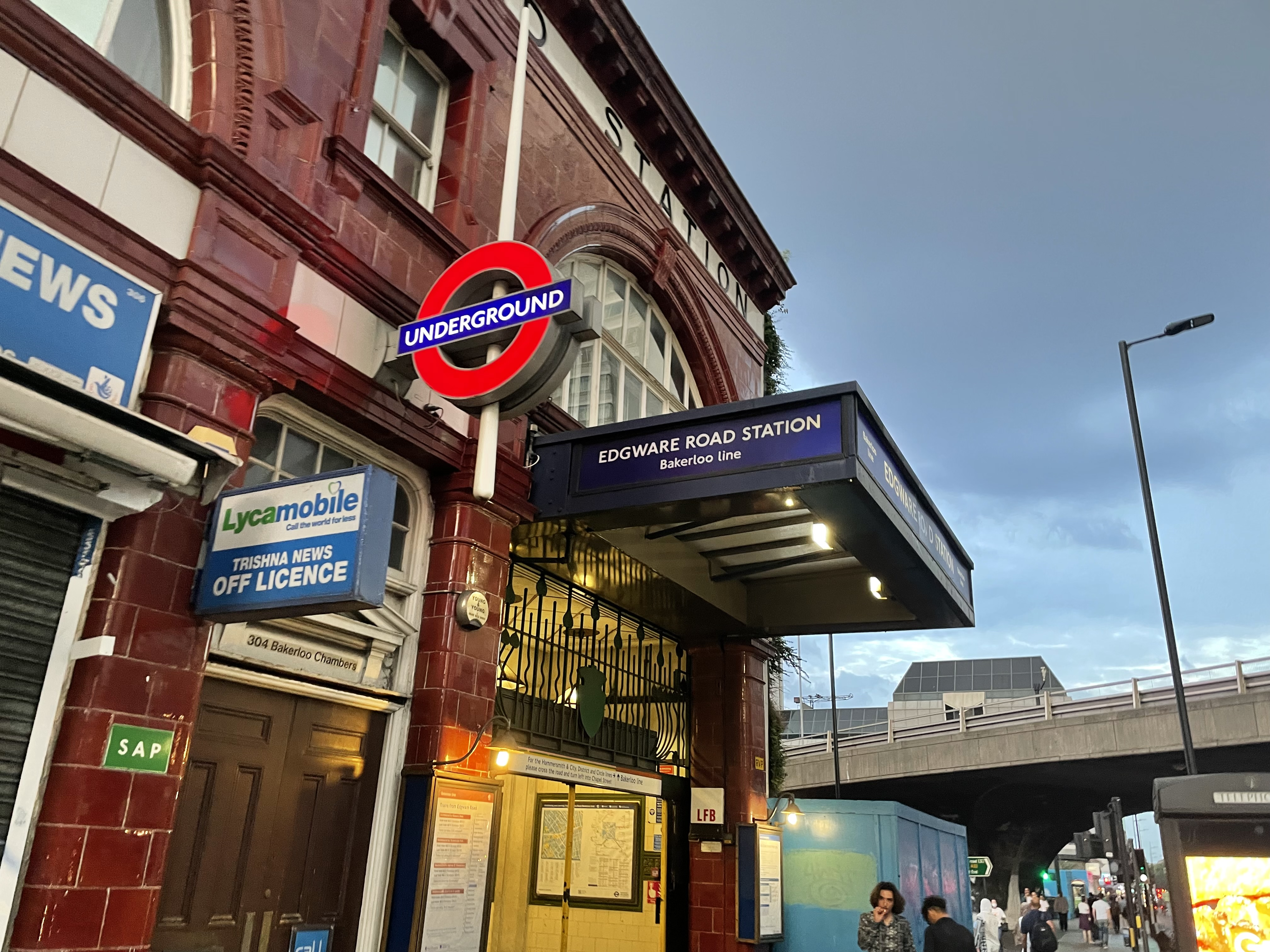
- Edgware Road station (Bakerloo line)
- Interactive map of Edgware Road

General information
- Location: Edgware Road
- Local authority: City of Westminster
- Managed by: London Underground
- Number of platforms: 2
- Fare zone: 1
- OSI: Edgware Road (CDH)

London Underground annual entry and exit
- 2020: ▼2.36 million
- 2021: ▼2.18 million
- 2022: ▲3.51 million
- 2023: ▼3.44 million
- 2024: ▲3.72 million

Key dates
- 15 June 1907: Opened as terminus (BS&WR)
- 1 December 1913: Became through station

Other information
- External links: TfL station info page
- Coordinates: 51.520278°N 0.170278°W

Edgware Road (/ˈɛdʒwɛər ˈroʊd/) is a London Underground station. It is on the Bakerloo line between Paddington and Marylebone stations, and is in London fare zone 1. The station is located on the north-east corner of the junction of Edgware Road, Harrow Road and Marylebone Road. It is adjacent to the Marylebone flyover. A separate station of the same name but served by the Circle, District and Hammersmith & City lines is situated nearby, to the south of Marylebone Road. (Note: The other station was opened by the Metropolitan Railway in 1863 as part of the world's first underground railway.)

There have been proposals in the past to rename one of the Edgware Road stations to avoid confusion. Neither of them should be confused with Edgware station, the northern terminus of the Edgware branch of the Northern line.

== History ==
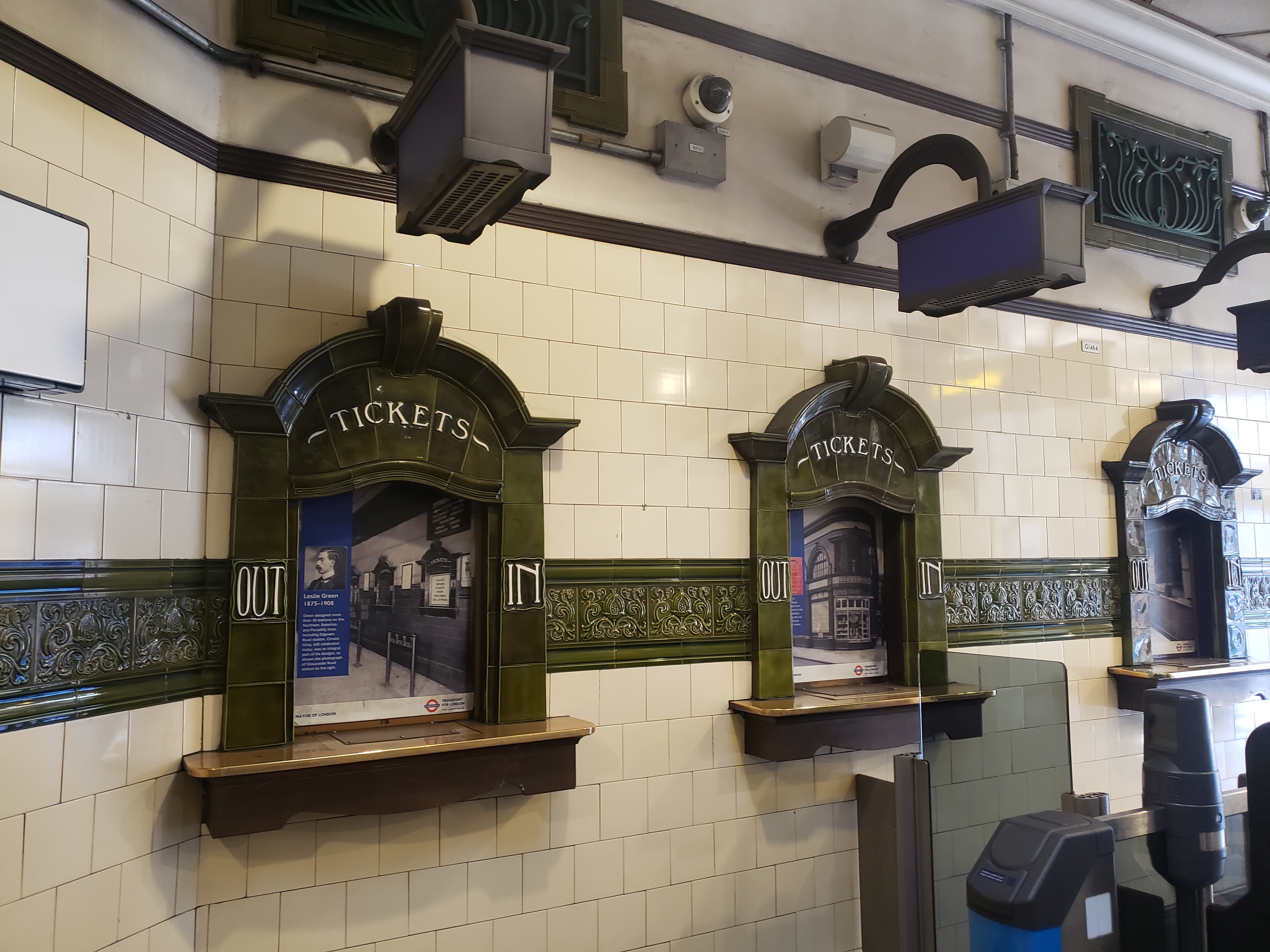
Old ticket counters at the station

Edgware Road station was opened on 15 June 1907 by the Baker Street and Waterloo Railway (BS&WR, now the Bakerloo line) when it extended its line from the temporary northern terminus at Marylebone. In common with other early stations of the lines owned by the Underground Electric Railways Company of London, the station was designed by architect Leslie Green with an ox-blood red glazed terracotta façade. The BS&WR had parliamentary approval to continue the line to Paddington station, but the approved route, which curved under the main line station and ended under the junction of Sussex Gardens and Sussex Place on a south-easterly heading, was not suitable for the company's plan to extend west or north-west from Paddington. The BS&WR chose not to construct the tunnels west of Edgware Road whilst it considered alternatives.

In 1908 the BS&WR considered a joint scheme with the North West London Railway (NWLR) to build a tube line from Edgware Road station to Cricklewood via Kilburn. The NWLR had obtained permission to build a line along Edgware Road from Cricklewood to Marble Arch in 1899; although it received approval for an additional section from Marble Arch to Victoria in 1906, it had been unable to raise the money to build the line. The permitted NWLR route passed Edgware Road station and the companies sought permission in November 1908 for a section of tunnel 757 metres (2,484 ft) long linking the BS&WR and the NWLR tunnels. To make use of the BS&WR's existing permission for the line to Paddington, Edgware Road station was to be provided with a second pair of platforms to enable the operation of a shuttle service between Paddington and Edgware Road. The scheme was rejected and the line was not built.

In 1911, permission was received to construct a tightly curved 890-metre (2,920 ft) long extension to Paddington which ended heading north-west under the main line station. Work started in August 1911 and the extension opened on 1 December 1913. When the station opened, its narrow frontage was in a row of shops, but the buildings to the south of the station were demolished in the 1960s to enable the Marylebone flyover to be built, leaving the station as one of two isolated buildings. Originally, an exit from the station was provided in adjacent Bell Street. Although this is no longer used, the building provides office accommodation for the station managers.

In 1983, London Transport proposed to close the station on the basis that the passenger lifts, which at the time were 77 years old, needed to be replaced at a cost of more than £3 million. The proposal was dropped following a request by the GLC for the matter to be reconsidered.

In September 2007, there was a proposal by London Assembly member Murad Qureshi to rename this station Church Street Market, as this would end the confusion between this station and its namesake on the Circle, District and Hammersmith & City lines.

Between 25 May and 21 December 2013, the station closed temporarily for lift maintenance work.

== Connections ==
London Buses routes 6, 16, 18 and 98 and night routes N18, N32, N98 and N118 serve the station.

== Notes and references ==
=== Bibliography ===
- Badsey-Ellis, Antony (2005). London's Lost Tube Schemes. Capital Transport. ISBN 1-85414-293-3.
- Rose, Douglas (1999). The London Underground, A Diagrammatic History. Douglas Rose/Capital Transport. ISBN 1-85414-219-4.

Preceding station	London Underground	Following station
Paddington towards Harrow & Wealdstone	Bakerloo line	Marylebone towards Elephant & Castle
