= Alfies Antique Market =

Antiques market in Lisson Grove, London

Coordinates: 51.5242°N 0.1688°W

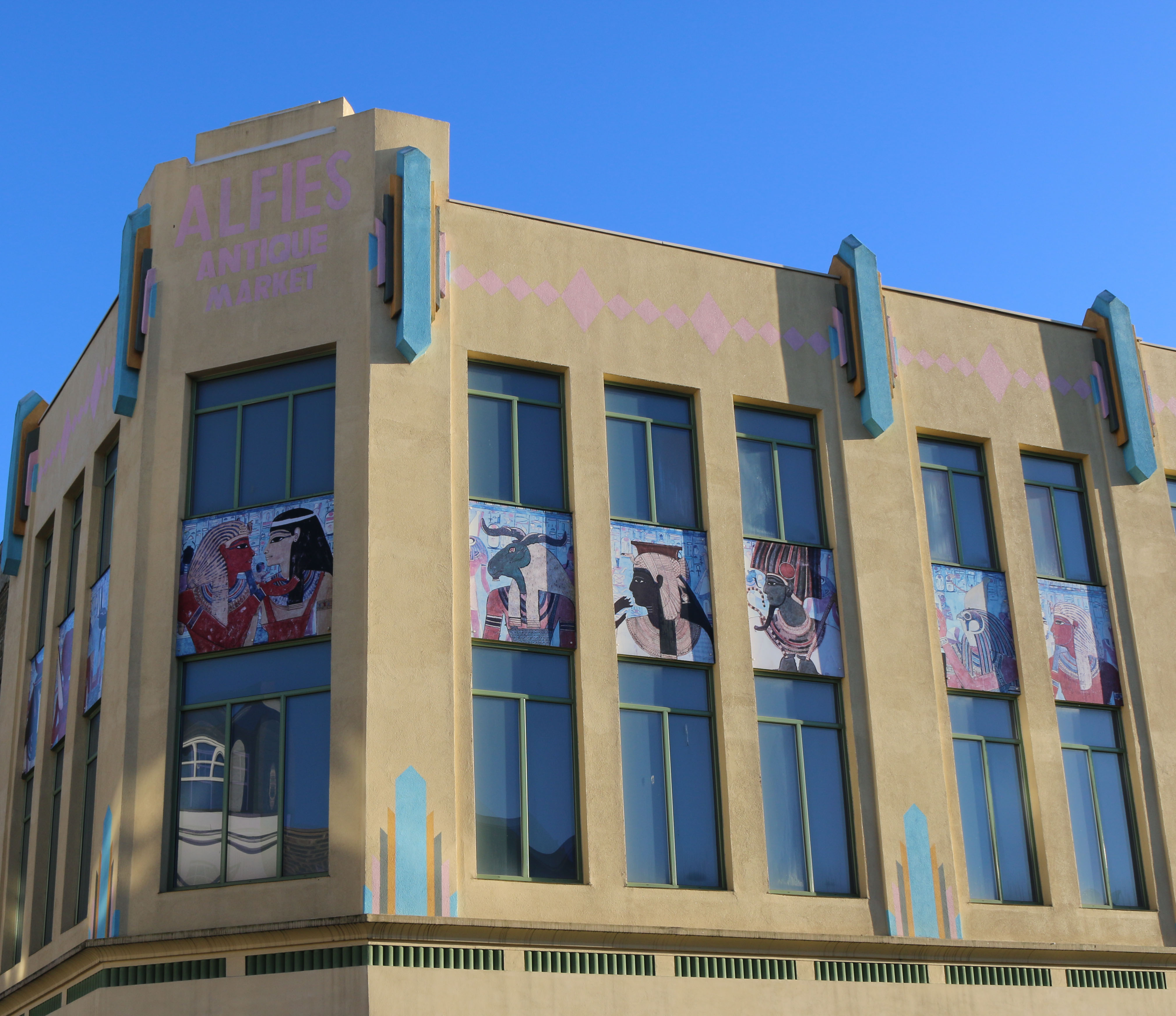
Alfies Antiques Market

Alfies Antique Market is a large indoor market located on Church Street in Lisson Grove, London. It houses over seventy-five dealers offering antiques; including silver, furniture, jewellery, paintings, ceramics, glass and vintage clothing.

== History ==
Alfies was opened by Bennie Gray in 1976, housed in the Edwardian buildings of the former Jordans department store. Renovations have included an extension in 1988. The complex now covers 35,000 square feet (3,300 m^{2}) over five floors. The Quad opened in 2005, focussing on modern design from the last hundred years.
