= Church Street, Marylebone =

Street in London

Coordinates: 51.52284°N 0.17118°W

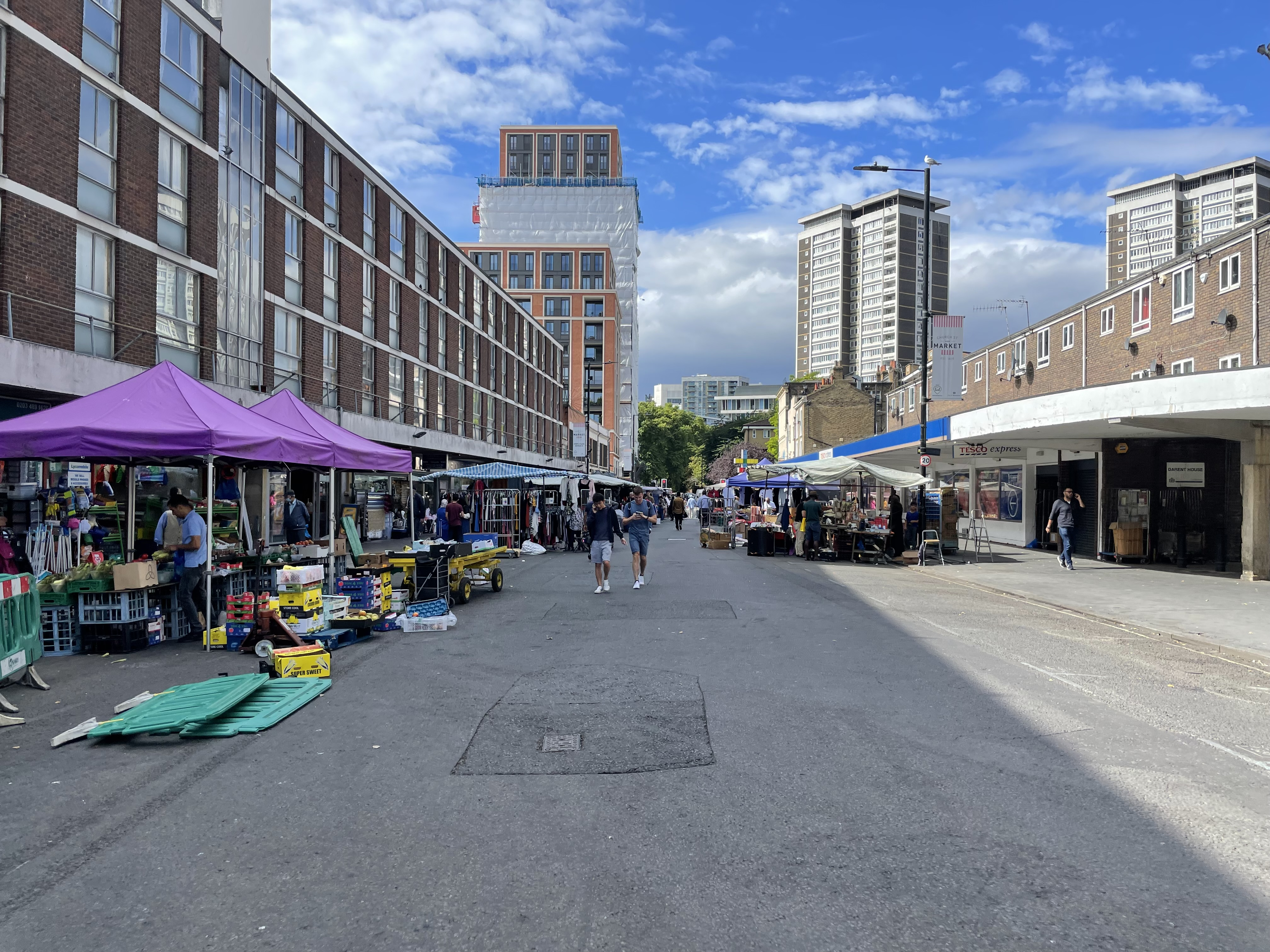
Church Street looking west towards Edgeware Road.

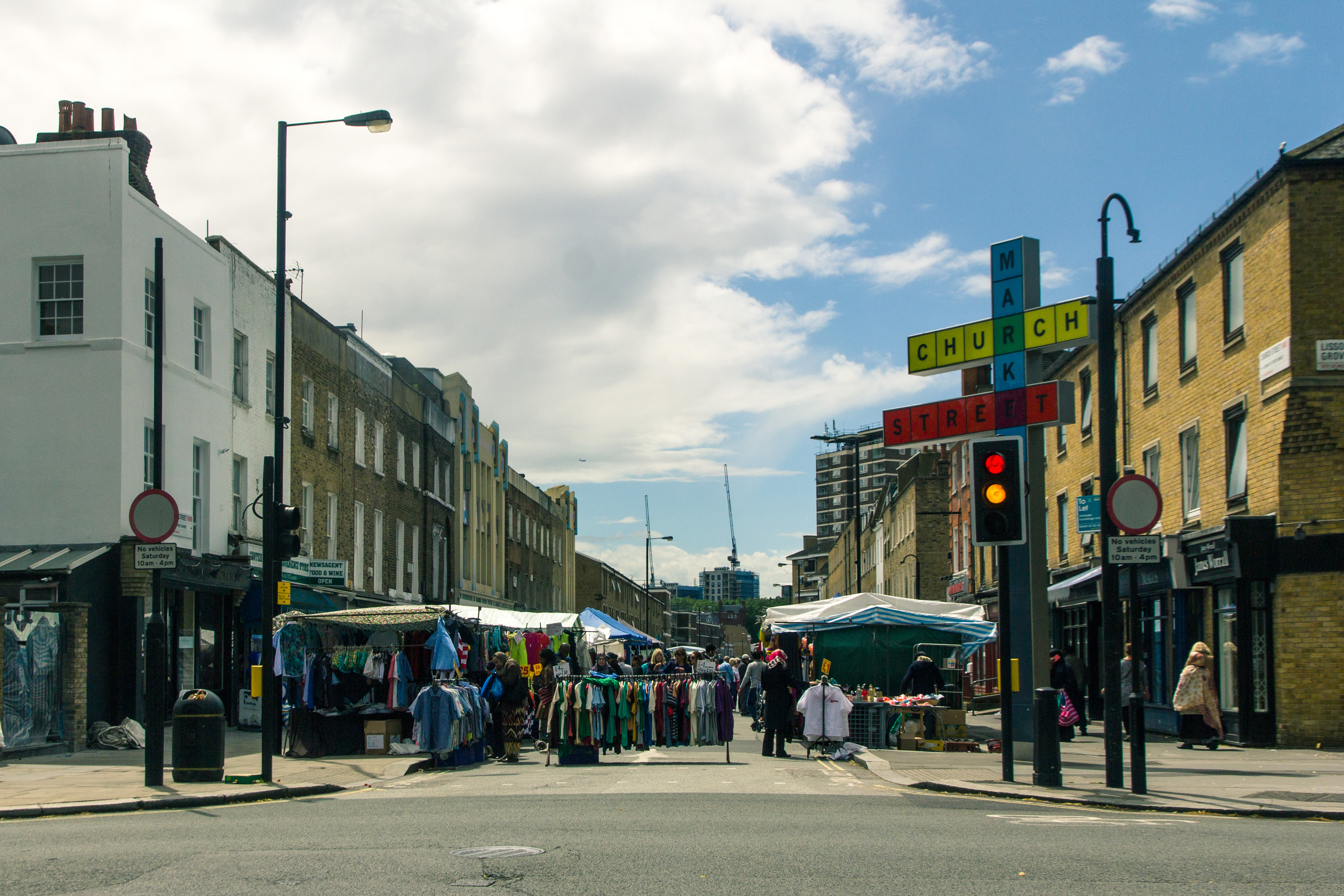
Church Street Market.

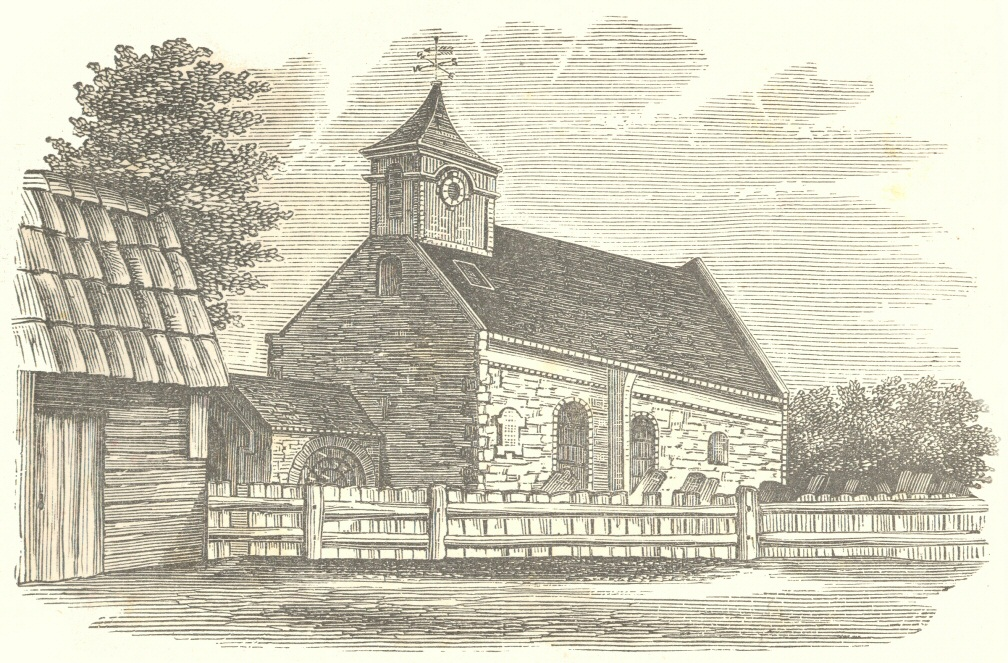
The old St Mary's Church from which the street gets its name.

Church Street is a thoroughfare in Marylebone, located in West London, within the West End of London. Located in the City of Westminster, it runs from Lisson Grove on a south west diagonal crossing Edgware Road and finishing at Paddington Green and the nearby St Mary's Church, from which the street gets its name. The Church Street electoral ward is named after the street.

The nineteenth century Theatre Royal, Marylebone was located here. During the Second World War the area was badly bombed and was heavily redeveloped which, along with slum clearance, means most of the buildings date from the twentieth century. In the modern era it is known for the Church Street Market.

== Bibliography ==
- Bebbington, Gillian. London Street Names. Batsford, 1972.
- Cherry, Bridget & Pevsner, Nikolaus. London 3: North West. Yale University Press, 2002.
- Kershman, Andrew & Ireson, Ally. The London Market Guide. Metro Publications, 2000.
