= Levi and the Rockats =

British rockabilly revival band

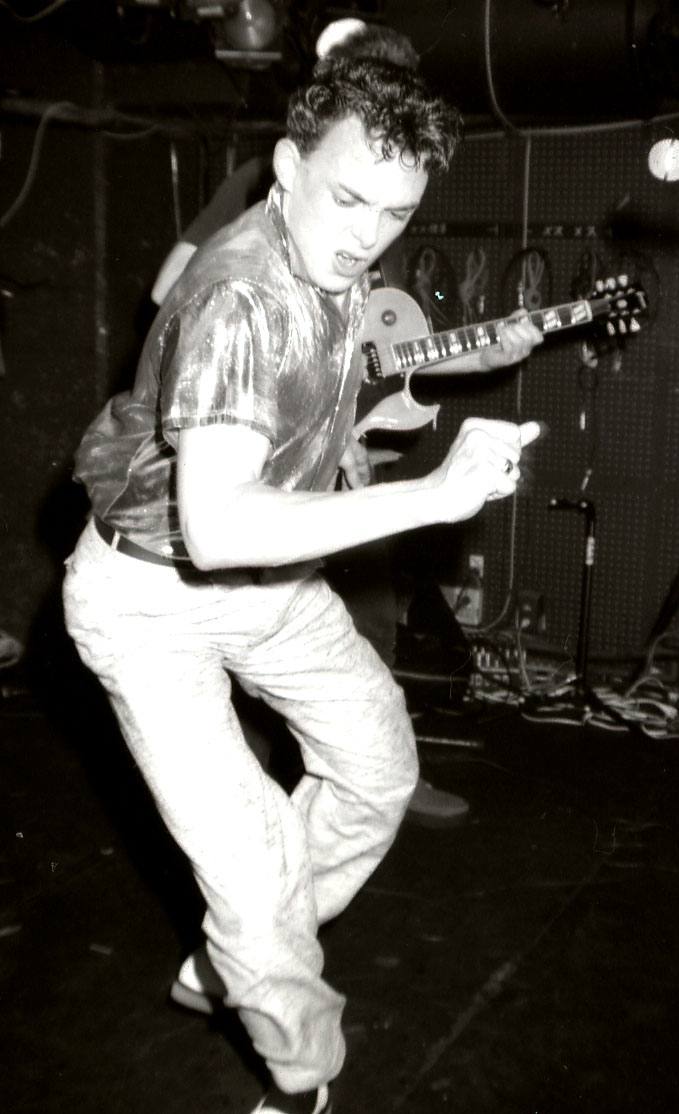
- Levi Dexter performing in Tokyo, Japan, 1992

Background information
- Origin: Southend-on-Sea, England
- Genres: Rockabilly, cowpunk, new wave
- Years active: 1977–present
- Label: RAK Records
- Past members: Levi Dexter; Dibbs Preston; Barry Ryan; Danny B. Harvey; Smutty Smiff; Jerry Nolan; Lewis King
- Website: www.racey.net www.raceyweb.com/history.htm

Levi and the Rockats are a British rockabilly revival band originally from Essex. They are recognised as one of the pioneering neo-rockabilly groups of the 1980s.

== History ==
Levi & the Rockats were founded in 1977 by Levi Dexter, a Teddy Boy from Southend-on-Sea. His main influences included Gene Vincent, Eddie Cochran and Elvis Presley, musicians popular among the 1960s British rocker subculture. In December 1979 Levi & the Rockats disbanded and the Rockats continued under that name. Levi Dexter went solo and is still performing rockabilly music and was inducted into the Rockabilly Hall of Fame.

In the 1980s, the Rockats opened for groups like Kiss, Iggy Pop, The Clash, David Bowie, Tina Turner, Thin Lizzy, and The Pretenders. After Levi Dexter left the band, it was re-formed with Dibbs Preston on vocals. This band is notable as one of the first rockabilly groups to incorporate punk rock and new wave influences to appeal to both punks and Teds, influencing later groups like Brian Setzer's Stray Cats and Dave Alvin's The Blasters, while retaining the raw authenticity of pre-British Invasion Rock and roll.

== Awards ==
The Rockats toured the UK, Japan and US. They also appeared on Andy Warhol's TV show in 1979 and were interviewed by Deborah Harry. Their most successful single was "Make that Move" which charted on the MTV charts in 1984, shortly after the band was signed on with RCA records.

== Discography ==
=== Studio recordings ===
- Room to Rock/All Thru the Nite SP (Peer Communications, 1979)
- Rockabilly Idol/Note from the South SP (Peer Communications, 1979)
- Rockabilly Doll/Tanya Jean SP (Kat Tale Records, 1980)
- Make That Move EP (RCA, 1983)
- Downtown Saturday Night LP (Jimco Records Japan, 1994)
- The Good, the Bad, the Rockin' LP (Fury Records, 1997)
- True Hearted Woman EP (Downer Records Japan, 2000)
- Rollin' Thunder LP (Downer Records Japan, 2001)
- Wild Love LP (Blue Leaf Records, 2003)
- Rockin' Together LP (Lanark Records, 2013)
- Start Over Again LP (Cleopatra Records, 2022)

=== Live recordings ===
- Live at the Ritz LP (Island Records, 1981)
- Live at the Louisiana Hayride LP (Posh Boy Records, 1981)
- Raw in Japan LP (Jimco Records Japan, 1992)
- The Last Bop – Farewell 1984 LP (Revel Yell Music Japan, 2003)

== Members ==
- Levi Dexter – lead vocal
- Dibbs Preston – lead vocal
- Stephen Dennis "Smutty Smiff" Smith – standup bass
- Mick Barry – rhythm guitar, vocals
- Barry Ryan – lead guitar
- Dean Thomas – drummer
- Guy Hemmer – rhythm guitar
- Danny B. Harvey – lead guitar
- Lewis King (Curt Weiss) – drums
- Ira Kaye – drums
- Steve Clark – drums
- Jerry Nolan – drums
