= BBC Four Collections =

BBC Four Collections is a selected variation of factual television episodes and series available on British video-on-demand service BBC iPlayer. The collections themselves primarily involve "experts" like Richard Osman, Janet Street-Porter and David Attenborough selecting various programmes from the BBC Archive to be made available on the iPlayer service. Every programme is marked with a short introduction marking the collection with BBC Four branding. Each collection has a particular theme like modern classical music, the British Army and interviews with famous figures. Some collections were established in 2012, more being added to the service until 2014. As of 2023, most of the content is still available on the iPlayer service, with some becoming unavailable due to rights or other reasons, like the Tim Westwood sexual assault allegations.

== List of collections ==
Only collections with a noted author (mentioned at the start of each programme) are included in this list.

Expert	Collection	Year	Programme	Episode Title or Date	Available (as of 2023)
Mark Urban	Army: A Very British Institution	1968	Breakaway	5. "My Friends Think I'm Mad"	Yes
Mark Urban	Army: A Very British Institution	1990	Everyman	"A Game of Soldiers"	Yes
Mark Urban	Army: A Very British Institution	1977	In Her Majesty's Service	6. Corporal of Horse Christopher Slater, The Life Guards Squadron of the Household Cavalry Regiment	Yes
Mark Urban	Army: A Very British Institution	1989	In the Highest Tradition	N/A, 6-episode series	Yes
Mark Urban	Army: A Very British Institution	1989	Inside Out: Ticking with the Crow/The Officers' Mess	N/A	Yes
Mark Urban	Army: A Very British Institution	1960	Meet the Red Devils: Parachute Regiment	N/A	Yes
Mark Urban	Army: A Very British Institution	1985	Moment of Truth	Episode 6	Yes
Mark Urban	Army: A Very British Institution	1969	Omnibus	Makers of the Queen's Music	Yes
Mark Urban	Army: A Very British Institution	1975	Panorama	Sandhurst	Yes
Mark Urban	Army: A Very British Institution	1983	The Paras	N/A, 7-episode series	Yes
Mark Urban	Army: A Very British Institution	1977	The Regiment	N/A	Yes
Mark Urban	Army: A Very British Institution	1977	Silver Jubilee	Review of the British Army	Yes
Mark Urban	Army: A Very British Institution	1977	Trooping the Colour	Silver Jubilee	Yes
Mark Urban	Army: A Very British Institution	1952	Trooping the Colour	1952	Yes
Mark Urban	Army: A Very British Institution	1974	Tuesday Documentary	The Bomb Disposal Men	Yes
Mark Urban	Army: A Very British Institution	1968	Tuesday Documentary	Death or Glory	Yes
Simon Jenkins	London	1987	Open Space	Bad Meaning Good	No (Note: Due to the Tim Westwood sexual assault allegations.)
Simon Jenkins	London	1975	Going Places	12	Yes
Simon Jenkins	London	1964	A City Crowned with Green	N/A	Yes
Simon Jenkins	London	1950	The Debate Continues	N/A	Yes
Simon Jenkins	London	1946	First-Year Flashbacks	N/A	Yes
Simon Jenkins	London	1999	Inside Story	Fish Tales	Yes
Simon Jenkins	London	1968	One Pair of Eyes	Georgia Brown: Who are the Cockneys Now?	Yes
Simon Jenkins	London	1956	Special Enquiry	A Girl Comes to London	Yes
Simon Jenkins	London	1960	A House in Bayswater	N/A	Yes
Simon Jenkins	London	1969	How They Dug the Victoria Line	N/A	Yes
Simon Jenkins	London	1971	Man Alive	Hyde Park	Yes
Simon Jenkins	London	1969	I Love This Dirty Town	N/A	Yes
Simon Jenkins	London	1985	Ours to Keep	Incomers	No
Simon Jenkins	London	1959	After the Battle	London - Ed Murrow Reports	Yes
Simon Jenkins	London	1957	Eye To Eye	London-New York	Yes
Simon Jenkins	London	1955	Cities of Europe	London: We Live by the River	Yes
Simon Jenkins	London	1968	Contrasts	Marble Arch to Edgware	Yes
Simon Jenkins	London	1976	Inside Story	The Market	Yes
Simon Jenkins	London	1991	Clive James	Postcard from London	Yes
Simon Jenkins	London	1985	Just Another Day	Soho	Yes
Simon Jenkins	London	1985	Just Another Day	The Tower of London	Yes
Simon Jenkins	London	1996	Modern Times	Streetwise	Yes
Simon Jenkins	London	1967	Three Swings on a Pendulum	N/A	Yes
Simon Jenkins	London	1985	To the World's End: Scenes and Characters on a London Bus Route	N/A	Yes
Clemency Burton-Hill	Modern Classical Music	2005	Boulez at 80	N/A	Yes
Clemency Burton-Hill	Modern Classical Music	2005	BBC Proms 2005	Michael Berkeley, Ben Britten & Vaughan Williams	Yes
Clemency Burton-Hill	Modern Classical Music	1964	Celebrity Recital	Benjamin Britten and Peter Pears.	Yes
Clemency Burton-Hill	Modern Classical Music	2004	John Cage Live at the Barbican	N/A	Yes
Clemency Burton-Hill	Modern Classical Music	1978	Julian Bream Masterclass	N/A, 5-episode series	Yes
Clemency Burton-Hill	Modern Classical Music	2001	Music Masters	Stockhausen	No
Clemency Burton-Hill	Modern Classical Music	2001	Music Masters	John Adams	Yes
Clemency Burton-Hill	Modern Classical Music	1968	Omnibus	Diaghilev: The Years Abroad	Yes
Clemency Burton-Hill	Modern Classical Music	2001	''Philip Glass Concert: Live at the Barbican	N/A	Yes
Clemency Burton-Hill	Modern Classical Music	2013	The Sound and the Fury in Concert	N/A, 3 episode series	Yes
Clemency Burton-Hill	Modern Classical Music	1964	War Requiem	N/A	Yes
Gary Boyd-Hope	Steam Railways	1968	4472 - Flying Scotsman	N/A	Yes
Gary Boyd-Hope	Steam Railways	1963	Let's Imagine	A Branch Line Railway with John Betjeman	Yes
Gary Boyd-Hope	Steam Railways	1975	The World About Us	The Romance of Indian Railways	Yes
Gary Boyd-Hope	Steam Railways	1986	Steam Days	N/A, 6 episode series	No
Gary Boyd-Hope	Steam Railways	1979	The Rainhill Story: Stephenson's Rocket	N/A	Yes
Gary Boyd-Hope	Steam Railways	1988	The Train Now Departing	N/A, 6 episode series	No
Gary Boyd-Hope	Steam Railways	1969	Tuesday Documentary	Engines Must Not Enter the Potato Siding	Yes
Gary Boyd-Hope	Steam Railways	1962	In View	Men of Steam	Yes
Gary Boyd-Hope	Steam Railways	1980	The Past at Work	Railway Mania	Yes
Gary Boyd-Hope	Steam Railways	1980	The Great Railway Cavalcade: Rocket 150 at Rainhill	N/A	Yes
Gary Boyd-Hope	Steam Railways	1977	With a Fine Feeling for Steam	N/A	Yes
Robin Lane Fox	Archaeology at the BBC	1956	Animal, Vegetable, Mineral?	3 May 1956	Yes
Robin Lane Fox	Archaeology at the BBC	1958	Animal, Vegetable, Mineral?	1 October 1958	Yes
Robin Lane Fox	Archaeology at the BBC	1960	The Grandeur That Was Rome	N/A, 3 episode series	Yes
Robin Lane Fox	Archaeology at the BBC	1958	Armchair Voyage: Hellenic Cruise	N/A, 3 episode series	Yes
Robin Lane Fox	Archaeology at the BBC	1974	Sir Mortimer and Magnus	N/A, 6 episode series	Yes
Robin Lane Fox	Archaeology at the BBC	1966	Chronicle	Vikings in North America	Yes
Robin Lane Fox	Archaeology at the BBC	1966	Chronicle	The Roman Goose March: The Holy Sailors	Yes
Robin Lane Fox	Archaeology at the BBC	1973	Chronicle	The Ape Man That Never Was	Yes
Robin Lane Fox	Archaeology at the BBC	1954	Buried Treasure	Stonehenge	Yes
Robin Lane Fox	Archaeology at the BBC	1956	Buried Treasure	The Walls of Jericho	Yes
Robin Lane Fox	Archaeology at the BBC	1958	Buried Treasure	King Solomon's Mines	Yes
Robin Lane Fox	Archaeology at the BBC	1957	Buried Treasure	Mohenjo-daro	Yes
Robin Lane Fox	Archaeology at the BBC	1954	Buried Treasure	The Peat Bog Murder Mystery	Yes
Julian Joseph	Blues	1985	Arena	Blues Night (5-episode series)	Yes
Julian Joseph	Blues	1979	The Devil's Music (series 2)	N/A, 4-episode series	Yes
Julian Joseph	Blues	1972	Sounding Out	B.B. King	Yes
Janet Street-Porter	Post-War Architecture	1986	Architecture at the Crossroads	Doubt and Reassessment	Yes
Janet Street-Porter	Post-War Architecture	1986	Architecture at the Crossroads	Stop the Bulldozer	Yes
Janet Street-Porter	Post-War Architecture	1986	Architecture at the Crossroads	Houses Fit for People	Yes
Janet Street-Porter	Post-War Architecture	1988	Building Sights	Schlumberger Building	Yes
Janet Street-Porter	Post-War Architecture	1988	Building Sights	Byker Wall	Yes
Janet Street-Porter	Post-War Architecture	1988	Building Sights	Alexander Fleming House	Yes
Janet Street-Porter	Post-War Architecture	1989	Building Sights	Janet Street-Porter	Yes
Janet Street-Porter	Post-War Architecture	1991	Building Sights	Lloyd's Building	Yes
Janet Street-Porter	Post-War Architecture	1991	Building Sights	Trellick Tower	Yes
Janet Street-Porter	Post-War Architecture	1991	Building Sights	Boarbank Hall Oratory	Yes
Janet Street-Porter	Post-War Architecture	1996	Building Sights	Canary Wharf	Yes
Janet Street-Porter	Post-War Architecture	1996	Building Sights	Worsley Medical Building	Yes
Janet Street-Porter	Post-War Architecture	1996	Building Sights	Hauer-King House	Yes
Janet Street-Porter	Post-War Architecture	1996	Building Sights	Humber Bridge	Yes
Janet Street-Porter	Post-War Architecture	1996	Building Sights	Wood Street Police Station	Yes
Janet Street-Porter	Post-War Architecture	1996	Building Sights	Alton Estate	Yes
Janet Street-Porter	Post-War Architecture	1996	Building Sights	Willis Corroon	Yes
Janet Street-Porter	Post-War Architecture	1972	Nairn Across Britain	N/A, 3-episode series	Yes
Janet Street-Porter	Post-War Architecture	1969	Omnibus	The More We Are Together	Yes
Janet Street-Porter	Post-War Architecture	1979	Where We Live Now	New Town, Home Town	Yes
David Attenborough	The Early Years	2013	David Attenborough: The Early Years	N/A	Yes
David Attenborough	The Early Years	1963	Adventure	Quest under Capricorn (6-episode series)	Yes
David Attenborough	The Early Years	1965	Adventure	Zambezi (3 episodes)	Yes
David Attenborough	The Early Years	1961	Zoo Quest	To Madagascar (5 episodes)	Yes
David Attenborough	The Early Years	1956	Zoo Quest	for a Dragon (6 episodes)	Yes
David Attenborough	The Early Years	1955	Zoo Quest	to West Africa	Yes
David Attenborough	The Early Years	1960	The People of Paradise	First 5 episodes of 6	Yes
David Attenborough	The Early Years	1969	The Miracle of Bali	N/A, 3-episode series	Yes
David Attenborough	The Early Years	1961	Elsa the Lioness	N/A	Yes
Michael Parkinson	Talk	1959	Face to Face	Bertrand Russell	Yes
Michael Parkinson	Talk	1959	Face to Face	Dame Edith Sitwell	Yes
Michael Parkinson	Talk	1959	Face to Face	Carl Jung	Yes
Michael Parkinson	Talk	1960	Face to Face	Stirling Moss	Yes
Michael Parkinson	Talk	1960	Face to Face	Evelyn Waugh	Yes
Michael Parkinson	Talk	1960	Face to Face	Adam Faith	Yes
Michael Parkinson	Talk	1961	Face to Face	Martin Luther King	Yes
Michael Parkinson	Talk	1994	Face to Face	Maya Angelou	Yes
Michael Parkinson	Talk	1994	Face to Face	Jeanette Winterson	Yes
Michael Parkinson	Talk	1995	Face to Face	Lauren Bacall	Yes
Michael Parkinson	Talk	1995	Face to Face	Ken Dodd	Yes
Michael Parkinson	Talk	1972	Parkinson	David Niven	Yes
Michael Parkinson	Talk	1974	Parkinson	Dr Jacob Bronowski	Yes
Michael Parkinson	Talk	1998	Parkinson	Billy Connolly & David Attenborough	Yes
Michael Parkinson	Talk	1974	The Frost Interview	David Frost interviews Muhammad Ali	Yes
Michael Parkinson	Talk	1974	The Frost Interview	Brian Clough	Yes
Michael Parkinson	Talk	2003	Breakfast with Frost	Tony Blair	Yes
Michael Parkinson	Talk	2003	Breakfast with Frost	Dominique de Villepin	Yes
Michael Parkinson	Talk	2004	Breakfast with Frost	Donald Rumsfeld	Yes
Michael Parkinson	Talk	1965	Late Night Line-Up	16 October 1965	Yes
Michael Parkinson	Talk	1966	Late Night Line-Up	20 November 1966	Yes
Michael Parkinson	Talk	1966	Late Night Line-Up	Coco the Clown	Yes
Michael Parkinson	Talk	1966	Imtimations	10. John le Carre	Yes
Michael Parkinson	Talk	1966	People to Watch	Ronald Reagan	Yes
Michael Parkinson	Talk	1960	Monitor	Henry Moore	Yes
Michael Parkinson	Talk	1955	In Town Tonight	22 October 1955	Yes
Michael Parkinson	Talk	1955	In Town Tonight	29 October 1955	Yes
Michael Parkinson	Talk	1955	Panorama	Salvador Dalí	Yes
Michael Parkinson	Talk	1955	Panorama	Ed Murrow	Yes
Michael Parkinson	Talk	1955	Press Conference	Orson Welles	Yes
Michael Parkinson	Talk	1982	Arena	Desert Island Discs	Yes
Michael Parkinson	Talk	1963	The Solitary Billionaire: J. Paul Getty	N/A	Yes
Michael Parkinson	Talk	1971	Daphne Du Maurier	N/A	Yes
Michael Parkinson	Talk	1984	Wogan	18 February 1984	Yes
Michael Parkinson	Talk	1984	Wogan	25 December 1984	Yes
Michael Parkinson	Talk	1987	Wogan	9 November 1987	Yes
Michael Parkinson	Talk	1970	Personal Choice	Jane Fonda	Yes
Michael Parkinson	Talk	1956	Picture Parade	Joan Crawford	No
Adam Curtis	All American	1972	Alistair Cooke's America	The First Impact	No
Adam Curtis	All American	1981	Arena	Chelsea Hotel	Yes
Adam Curtis	All American	2004	Arena	Searching for the Wrong-Eyed Jesus	Yes
Adam Curtis	All American	1999	Close Up	Jackson Pollock: Love and Death on Long Island	Yes
Adam Curtis	All American	1965	Inside America	13. The Quiet Persuader	Yes
Adam Curtis	All American	1985	Omnibus	Stud Terkel's Chicago	Yes
Adam Curtis	All American	1966	Panorama	California 2000	Yes
Adam Curtis	All American	2001	Timewatch	The Empire State Story	Yes
Adam Curtis	All American	1967	Whicker's World	Conflict in Kentucky	Yes
Richard Osman	Classic Game Shows	2000	Friends Like These	18 November 2000	Yes
Richard Osman	Classic Game Shows	1982	Ask the Family	2 November 1982	Yes
Richard Osman	Classic Game Shows	2009	The Weakest Link	27 January 2009	No
Richard Osman	Classic Game Shows	2001	Big Break	19 May 2001	Yes
Richard Osman	Classic Game Shows	1987	Bob's Full House	19 December 1987	Yes
Richard Osman	Classic Game Shows	1974	What's My Line?	19 January 1974	No
Richard Osman	Classic Game Shows	1999	Call My Bluff	19 November 1999	No
Richard Osman	Classic Game Shows	1966	Quiz Ball	22 December 1966	Yes
Richard Osman	Classic Game Shows	1954	Animal, Vegetable, Mineral?	28 October 1954	Yes
Max Hastings	The Great War Interviews	1960s	The Great War Interviews	N/A, 13-episode series	Yes
