= Adrian Mills =

British television presenter and actor (born 1956)

- Occupation: Television presenter

Adrian Mills is a British television presenter and actor. He appeared on That's Life! with Esther Rantzen for seven years until 1994. The programme regularly attracted 20 million viewers. Since then, he has presented talk show Central Weekend Live, reported for BBC viewer feedback programme Bite Back and appeared as a location reporter on the TV series Surprise, Surprise. He later hosted the BBC's live morning programme People Today and was also a host on TV Travel Shop and Sky Travel. He is currently the consumer expert on Talk TV.

Mills attended the National Youth Theatre for four years and graduated from The Rose Bruford College of Speech and Drama in 1977. In 1982, he played the villainous Aris in the Doctor Who serial Kinda. He has appeared on various television programmes such as Minder, Brookside, Play for Today, Waiting for God and the ITV detective series Vera.

In 2019, Mills appeared in the West End as the narrator of the musical 'Call me Diana' based on the life of the Princess. In 2022 he hosted ‘Sunday at the Musicals’ in London, Eastbourne and Windsor, as well as being reunited with Esther Rantzen presenting a series of podcasts entitled That's After Life.

Mills is the co-owner of Thai Tho, a chain of Thai restaurants located in London; which included a site in Ealing, which was damaged in the 2011 England riots. He is a patron of The Holly Lodge Centre in Richmond Park and Chairman of The Wimbledon Village Business Association.
