= Trish Williamson =

British television presenter (1955–2007)

- Born: January 3, 1955; Newcastle upon Tyne, United Kingdom
- Died: November 9, 2007 (aged 52)
- Occupations: English TV presenter, producer and filmmaker
- Known for: her stint as a "weathergirl" on the ITV breakfast television programme Good Morning Britain on TV-am throughout the 1980s.

Patricia 'Trish' Noble Williamson (3 January 1955 – 9 November 2007) was an English TV presenter, producer and filmmaker, best known for her stint as a "weathergirl" on the ITV breakfast television programme Good Morning Britain on TV-am throughout the 1980s.

The daughter of journalist Harold Williamson, who notably worked on the BBC current affairs and documentary series Man Alive in the 1960s, Williamson was born in Newcastle upon Tyne, Northumberland, and studied at Durham University.

After leaving TV-am, she worked as a producer, presenter, and reporter on BBC regional television, including BBC Look North, London Tonight, and BBC1's current affairs series Inside Out. In 1991 she suffered an ectopic pregnancy and almost died.

The mother of two, who had just moved to Norfolk with her family, died aged 52 when her Ford Fiesta car left the B1116 road in Weybread, Suffolk, overturned, and landed in a field opposite. A coroner's inquest in Lowestoft in May 2008 concluded that Williamson died as a result of not wearing a seatbelt, and was consequently thrown through the window of her car, suffering multiple fatal injuries.

== Children ==
Trisha had two sons, Dominic and Edward. Dominic was the eldest of the two children and after studying at Worth School he pursued a life in journalism in New York. Dominic died not long after securing a full time job in the states. Edward followed a life in film and tv just like his mother and eventually formed his own video production company in Cornwall called Here Now Films. Edward now lives with his father, Tim Smit, in Cornwall where he continues a career in TV and film.
