= That's Life! =

British television series (1973–1994)

- Genre: Current affairs Consumer protection Light entertainment Satire
- Written by: John Lloyd, Esther Rantzen
- Directed by: Peter Chafer, Bob Marsland, Chris Fox, Stuart Macdonald, Robin Bextor, Pieter Morpurgo
- Presented by: Esther Rantzen, Cyril Fletcher, Glyn Worsnip, Kieran Prendiville, Paul Heiney, George Layton, Chris Serle, Adrian Mills, Gavin Campbell, Bill Buckley, Michael Groth, Doc Cox, Scott Sherrin, Joanna Monro, John Gould, Grant Baynham, Kevin Devine, Howard Leader, Simon Fanshawe, Maev Alexander, Mollie Sugden, Barry Cryer, June Whitfield
- Composer: Dave Lee
- Country of origin: United Kingdom
- Original language: English
- No. of series: 21
- No. of episodes: 442

Production
- Executive producers: Peter Chafer, Ron Neil, John Morrell, Shaun Woodward, John Getgood, Bryher Scudamore
- Producers: Esther Rantzen, Henry Murray, John Lloyd, Norma Shepherd
- Editors: Brian Freemantle, Roger Guertin, Christine Pancott, Annie Tyrrell
- Running time: 40-45 minutes

Original release
- Network: BBC1
- Release: 26 May 1973 – 19 June 1994

That's Life! is a satirical consumer affairs programme on the BBC, at its height regularly reaching audiences of fifteen to twenty million, and receiving between 10,000 and 15,000 letters a week. The series was broadcast on BBC1 for 21 years, from 26 May 1973 until 19 June 1994.

== Format ==
That's Life! was a magazine programme that blended light-hearted observations on everyday life, reports on consumer affairs (often blended with satire), and hard-hitting investigations in a studio-based format, with film inserts. Devised by Peter Chafer, John Lloyd and Esther Rantzen, it was presented and produced by Esther Rantzen with various teams of reporters and contributors. Special spin-off programmes concentrated on serious topics that were first aired on That's Life!, such as childbirth, mental health and child abuse. The programme's journalism relied on the skills of researchers, many of whom went on to hold senior jobs both inside and outside the media industry.

The large audiences, regularly topping the ratings charts and reaching a maximum of 22.5 million viewers, resulted in several changes in laws and practice, such as the introduction of compulsory seat belts for children, support for transplantation and the installing of safe surfaces in children's playgrounds.

== Origins ==
Bernard Braden, the Canadian actor and broadcaster, invented consumer programmes for British television with his ITV show On the Braden Beat. When in 1968 Braden and his wife Barbara Kelly agreed to transfer to the BBC, he starred with her in a situation comedy for the Entertainment Department, and he presented a consumer show which was produced in Desmond Wilcox's Features Department. John Lloyd was a freelance producer who had worked with Braden on the ITV consumer show, and in 1968 was hired to produce Braden's Week for the BBC. That show ran from 1968 to 1972 on Saturday nights on BBC1, featuring Esther Rantzen and John Pitman as reporters, and Ronald Fletcher, Chris Munds and Hilary Pritchard as humorous punctuation. It also featured Frankie Howerd, Victor Ross of Reader's Digest, and an expose of Robert Maxwell's company Pergamon Press.

The format was highly popular and included a studio audience, a regular music slot featuring singer/songwriter Jake Thackray, and sketches performed by Munds and Pritchard. It is sometimes wrongly thought that Braden was sacked by the BBC for making a commercial for Stork margarine in the summer of 1971, and although advertising a product was not felt compatible with Braden's role in a consumer show, Desmond Wilcox interceded for him with BBC senior executives, pointing out that at the time he was not under contract to the BBC, and he returned to make another series that autumn.

In 1972, however, Braden was hired by a Canadian network to create a similar programme there. After he left, producers Peter Chafer, John Lloyd and presenter Esther Rantzen were tasked by the BBC to create a replacement consumer programme without Braden. Rantzen invented the title, That's Life! When Bernard Braden returned to the UK having completed his contract to make a consumer programme in Canada, his show Braden's Week had been replaced in his absence, and Esther Rantzen was fronting That's Life! Braden's wife Barbara Kelly never forgave Rantzen, who she was convinced had stolen the role from Braden and had only been given the job because she was in a relationship with (and later married to) Features Department head Desmond Wilcox.

=== Launch of That's Life! ===
The first series of That's Life! broadcast in the summer of 1973 was written by John Lloyd, executive-produced by Peter Chafer and was presented by Esther Rantzen, George Layton (actor, director and screenwriter) and Bob Wellings (co-presenter of the nightly current affairs magazine programme Nationwide). A regular feature was "Heap of the Week" filmed by Bill Nicholson, later a novelist and Oscar-nominated screenwriter. At the end of the run the Controller of BBC1 decided that the show had potential, but not with that presentation team, since only Rantzen was comfortable in the consumer role.

A second series was commissioned for which Rantzen was promoted to producer and presenter, a role she held for the next twenty years. Kieran Prendiville, a journalist who had worked on Man Alive (and who was part of the That's Life! production team at the beginning) and actor Glyn Worsnip, both joined the team as reporters and stayed for five years.

=== That's Life! investigations ===
==== Swindles ====
During the programme's 21 years, many investigations highlighted dangers, swindles and injustices. Among the conmen were Peter Foster who was first exposed for selling a fake "slimming" tea called Bai Lin, various door-to-door salesmen selling double glazing, Coach House Finance based in Colchester in 1975 which resulted in a conviction for fraud, and many fake slimming aids.

==== Safety items ====
Including stories publicising dangerous cots, lifts, taxi doors, the introduction of safe playground surfaces, and inspiring the legal requirement for seat belts for children in cars.

==== Child abuse ====
This was regularly exposed on the programme. The launch of Childline by Esther Rantzen was inspired by a helpline for abused children set up after one episode of the programme.

=== Significant campaigns ===
==== Ben Hardwick ====
Ben Hardwick was a two-year-old toddler dying of biliary atresia, with only a few weeks to live. He was being treated by Professor Sir Roy Calne in Addenbrooks Hospital who told his mother Debbie that Ben's only hope would be a liver transplant, but transplantation had virtually ceased in the UK due to a Panorama documentary which implied that organs were being taken from patients who were still alive. Professor Calne suggested the only way to encourage organ donation would be to tell Ben's story on TV; Debbie, therefore, contacted That's Life!

The film of Ben captured the nation's imagination, a donor (Matthew Fewkes) was found and Ben lived for another year. On his death, Marti Webb recorded his favourite song, "Ben", to raise money for a charity founded in his name, and Shaun Woodward and Esther Rantzen wrote a book, Story of Ben Hardwick by Shaun Woodward and Esther Rantzen, which also raised money for the Ben Hardwick Fund which still exists. The impact of Ben's story doubled the number of transplants.

==== The Scandal of Crookham Court ====
A letter to Esther Rantzen, which was forwarded to her by Childline, came from a boy at the boarding school Crookham Court School in Newbury, who had been sexually abused by the owner of the school and had discovered that his brother was also sexually abused by another teacher. A three-month investigation uncovered widespread abuse of the boys in the school; Rantzen, Woolfe and Hereward Harrison (a Childline executive) visited the school to speak to pupils. Philip Cadman was the millionaire owner of the school who was later tried and convicted of abuse, as were teachers Bill Printer and Philip Edmonds.

A special programme, The Scandal of Crookham Court, reconstructed the court case at which the children gave evidence. Author Ian Mucklejohn assisted the investigation and has written a book based on his experience teaching at the school and the evidence of pupils who suffered abuse there.

==== Sir Nicholas Winton, the British Schindler ====
Sir Nicholas Winton was revealed for the first time on That's Life! as having rescued a generation of Czech children from the Holocaust. Unknown to him, or them, Sir Nicholas was placed in the audience next to three people and about twenty others around him who had been on the trains he organised and owed their life to him. Piers Morgan described it as the "best moment of television he had ever seen". It has been viewed on Facebook and YouTube more than forty million times. For his actions, Winton has been compared by the British press to Oskar Schindler.

A biography of Winton was written by his daughter, The Life of Sir Nicholas Winton by Barbara Winton, and documentaries were later made about his achievements. Other members of his team included Trevor Chadwick and Doreen Warriner.

==== Bullying ====
An anti-bullying campaign was inspired by the suicide of teenager Katharine Bamber, after a phone call to the programme from her mother Susan. It resulted in schools adopting anti-bullying policies.

=== Music on That's Life! ===
Music was provided each week by a range of artists, including Alex Glasgow, Jake Thackray, Five Penny Piece, Richard Stilgoe and Victoria Wood. For many years the British drummer and composer Tony Kinsey was musical director and arranged the title song "That's Life!" for the Hanwell Brass Band. Eventually the musical interludes were provided by non-singers; staff of big companies sang "The Lay of the Week" to customers who complained, and unsuspecting members of the public became a choir in "Get Britain Singing" in which the team of reporters went undercover in gloomy locations such as service stations and hospitals in order to startle people with a cheerful blast of music that inspired them to burst into song.

In 1992, That's Life's talent contest called Search for a Star discovered singer Alison Jordan, and record producer Simon Cowell who offered a contract as the top prize.

=== Humorous items on That's Life! ===
Rude vegetables sent in by viewers were notably memorable, cropping up in The Times more than 20 years after That's Life! ended. Also popular were the talented pets discovered by the show, which included dogs that played football, a cat who played ping-pong, dogs who caught soda water from a syphon and many others including a horse that could count. Besides the pets there were "talented tots", such as toddlers who could play the piano, snooker and golf.

Talented passers-by were also featured each week in the vox pops at the start of the show, including Annie Mizen, who was discovered in a street market in her eighties and became a star.

Esther Rantzen was arrested for obstruction when vox popping in the North End Road. The resulting film took pride of place in her edition of This Is Your Life in which the arresting officer P.C. A. Herbert was a surprise guest.

During its 21-year run, That's Life! was broadcast three times on 1 April, and each time created a prank film to fool the viewers. The first, directed by Nick Handel, appeared to show a dog that could drive. The second was an animal in London Zoo called a Lirpa Loof; starring David Bellamy, it persuaded charabanc-loads of visitors to search the zoo for the non-existent animal with purple droppings. The third was a face cream made from rhinoceros spit that eradicated wrinkles from the face but transferred them to the backside.

=== "That's Life All Over!" ===
In 1994, the show ended with a 90-minute special recalling the most memorable moments and listing some of the changes inspired by the series. "That's Life All Over!" included a surprise section that Rantzen did not know about in advance, hosted by David Frost.

In April 2024, Kirsty Wark presented an edition of the BBC Radio 4 series The Reunion, with guests George Layton, Chris Serle, Paul Heiney, Bill Buckley, Adrian Mills, Sir Peter Bazalgette, Jane Elsdon Dew and Esther Rantzen.

== Transmissions ==
=== Original series ===
Series	Start date	End date	Episodes
1	26 May 1973	18 August 1973	13
2	16 March 1974	17 August 1974	19
3	29 March 1975	23 August 1975	19
4	4 January 1976	23 May 1976	20
5	2 January 1977	28 May 1977	19
6	7 May 1978	23 July 1978	12
7	7 January 1979	17 June 1979	21
8	4 January 1981	12 July 1981	26
9	5 September 1982	12 December 1982	14
10	10 April 1983	26 June 1983	12
11	8 January 1984	15 July 1984	24
12	6 January 1985	7 July 1985	24
13	19 January 1986	6 July 1986	22
14	11 January 1987	5 July 1987	22
15	17 January 1988	3 July 1988	22
16	22 January 1989	25 June 1989	19
17	14 January 1990	1 July 1990	23
18	20 January 1991	30 June 1991	20
19	11 January 1992	11 July 1992	22
20	23 January 1993	3 July 1993	20
21	15 January 1994	11 June 1994	19

=== Spin-offs ===
Series	Start date	End date	Episodes
Junior That's Life	1 September 1979	5 October 1979	6
That's Life Report	22 May 1980	26 June 1980	6
That's Family Life	16 October 1984	20 November 1984	6

Special programmes were created on serious issues discussed on That's Life!, such as stillbirth, mental health, fire safety, and volunteers in their own time refurbishing the St Petersburg Children's Hospital.

- Talented Pets compilations
- A Christmas Special
- Junior That's Life! a series for children, introducing Shaun Ley
- That's Family Life! – an interview programme featuring family dilemmas
- The One Show in 2013 created a "That's Life Special" celebrating 40 years from the launch, and also launching The Silver Line Helpline for lonely and isolated older people.

=== Specials ===
Entitle	Air date
That's Life 1974	28 December 1974
That's Life Superpets	24 December 1977
Best of That's Life	5 August 1981
That's Life: Having a Baby	2 editions: 18 March 1982
Best of That's Life	23 August 1983
Summer 1984 Compilation	28 August 1984
Best of That's Life 1985	30 August 1985
Holiday Edition Compilation 1986	24 August 1986
Best of 1987	9 August 1987
The Gift of Life	10 January 1988
Best of 1988	28 August 1988
Britain's Most Talented Pets	2 January 1989
Best of 1989	28 August 1989
Talented Pets	1 January 1990
Holiday Special Compilation	27 August 1990
Talented Pets 3	31 December 1990
The Scandal of Crookham Court	13 January 1991
Summer Special Compilation	26 August 1991
Talented Pets 4	31 December 1991
Summer Special Compilation	30 August 1992
Summer Special Compilation	29 August 1993
Fire! Special Report	8 January 1994
That's Life – All Over: Final edition	19 June 1994

== Esther Rantzen's House Trap and Do The Right Thing ==
In October 2018, it was announced that a consumer show, Do The Right Thing would air on Channel 5, with Rantzen presenting alongside Eamonn Holmes and Ruth Langsford. Another Channel 5 consumer programme, Esther Rantzen's House Trap was a production more in keeping with the format of the BBC's long-running Watchdog programme, with hidden cameras trying to trap rogue traders in the homes of a number of undercover actors. Unlike Watchdog, these actors were all people of an advanced age with each episode focusing on a different trade, such as locksmiths, where older people were likely to being preyed upon.

Esther Rantzen's House Trap was a four-part series produced by Karen Plumb and Grant Mansfield at Plimsoll Productions for Channel 5, who commissioned the show alongside other consumer-focused shows such as Shop Smart Save Money and Do the Right Thing.
