= Rantzen v Mirror Group Newspapers (1986) Ltd and others =

1993 English defamation court case

- Court: Court of Appeal of England and Wales
- Full case name: Esther Louise Rantzen v Mirror Group Newspapers (1986) Ltd., Brian Radford, Richard Stott and Mirror Group Newspapers plc.
- Decided: 31 March 1993
- Citation: [1993] EWCA Civ 16, [1993] 4 All ER 975

Case history
- Appealed from: Queen's Bench Division of the High Court of Justice of England and Wales

Court membership
- Judges sitting: Lord Justice Neill, Lord Justice Staughton, Lord Justice Roch

Keywords
- libel

Esther Louise Rantzen v Mirror Group Newspapers (1986) Ltd., Brian Radford, Richard Stott and Mirror Group Newspapers plc. [1993] EWCA Civ 16, [1993] 4 All ER 975, also shortened to Rantzen v Mirror Group Newspapers by legal analysts, is a 1993 English defamation court case. The case was brought by the television presenter Esther Rantzen against Mirror Group Newspapers, publisher of The People which had alleged that Rantzen had protected a child abuser after he had given information about child abuse in a school.

The jury in the case at the Queen's Bench Division of the High Court of Justice of England and Wales found for Rantzen and awarded her £250,000 in damages. The defendants appealed the award to the Court of Appeal of England and Wales where the award was reduced to £110,000 as the court ruled that the damages awarded by the jury had been disproportionate.

== Background ==
Rantzen had helped to set up ChildLine with the BBC and ran it as the chairwoman. On 3 February 1991, The People newspaper published four articles alleging that Rantzen had used her position as chair of ChildLine to protect a teacher accused of child abuse as he had helped her earlier. The teacher in question had told Rantzen about abuse at Crookham Court school and resigned from teaching there as a result, which prompted Rantzen to take her That's Life! TV programme to the school to investigate, during which they had found evidence of abuse. Child pornography was found at the school after which was later attributed to having been created by the teacher, who had taken a new teaching job in Kent. The newspaper articles alleged that Rantzen had covered up the teacher's past and failed to inform the new school of this fact. The articles also claimed that Rantzen had lied to the newspaper by asking them not to publish them on the grounds that if the articles were published, then it would hamper the police investigation.

== High Court trial ==
Rantzen sued Mirror Group Newspapers for libelling her. She claimed that they had made implications that she had covered up child abuse allegations as a reward to the teacher for helping her and abandoned her own morality, had taken no action despite her position in ChildLine, made insincere and hypocritical statements and had lied to protect herself and the teacher. Mirror Group Newspapers put in a plea of justification and argued with a defence of fair comment. They argued against the plaintiff's claim that the article had implied that a cover up was a reward for assistance; the Judge allowed for this interpretation to be left up to the jury as well as directing them to consider the value of any award. The jury found that the articles were defamatory and awarded Rantzen £250,000 in damages.

== Appeal ==
Mirror Group Newspapers appealed to the Court of Appeal on the grounds that the judge had misdirected the jury by allowing them to consider the value of the award and downplaying mitigating factors in justification and requested a new trial. The Court dismissed this, as they felt that the judge had not misdirected the jury as he had been reasonable when balancing the decision.

The defendants also argued that the award by the jury was excessive in relation to the damage that the articles had caused. As a result, they requested a new trial under the Courts and Legal Services Act 1990. The Court considered this as the Act allowed for the Court either to order a new trial or to substitute the award for a figure that they deem appropriate. This power was introduced by the Lord Chancellor during the drafting of the bill so that disproportionately large awards by juries, once called "Mickey Mouse money" by members of the judiciary as juries tended to award amounts for libel that were larger than those for personal injury claims, could be substituted by the courts. The Court considered this alongside the applicability of Article 10 of the European Convention on Human Rights. They ruled that the Act which allowed for a new trial to be ordered if the award was disproportionate allowed for them to substitute the award in lieu of ordering a new trial and stated that juries should be instructed to consider purchasing power and proportionality of any award. As a result, the Court of Appeal quashed the £250,000 award and substituted it with an award of £110,000 and Rantzen was granted leave to appeal to the House of Lords.
