= John Pitman (journalist) =

British journalist (1939–2018)

- Born: 18 November 1939; Whitecroft, Gloucestershire, England
- Died: 14 February 2018 (aged 78)
- Education: Cirencester Grammar School
- Occupation: Journalist • television producer • documentary filmmaker
- Employer: Gloucestershire Echo • The Argus • BBC

John Pitman (18 November 1939 – 14 February 2018) was an English journalist, television producer and documentary filmmaker. He began his on-screen career as a researcher on Braden's Week but later became known for his reporting work on the BBC2 documentary series Man Alive.

== Biography ==
Pitman was born in Whitecroft, in the Forest of Dean, Gloucestershire, to Maudie (née Morse) and William Pitman. He attended Bexhill-on-Sea and then Cirencester Grammar Schools. He began his career in journalism with the Gloucestershire Echo and Brighton Argus newspapers before moving to the Daily Mail and then on to the BBC. His first on-screen role was as reporter on Braden's Week with Bernard Braden and Esther Rantzen.

He was also known for reporting for the series The Big Time, an edition of which launched the career of the singer Sheena Easton and he presented a follow-up programme Sheena Easton - the Making of a Star. The programmes helped to make her international career. Other editions included footballer Lol Cottrell, and "Beaminster and District Gardens and Allotments Society Goes to Chelsea". The series was produced by Esther Rantzen. In the late 1980s he devised and reported Just Another Day - a series of documentaries following a notional 'Day in the Life' of English places, institutions and professions. Another important series devised by Pitman was The Other Half, exploring the lives of less well-known partners of celebrities. The sensitive and sympathetic film "Angus and Tony", on Angus Wilson and Tony Garrett, directed by Jonathan Gili, broke new ground. As did his series Fame which he devised and reported and featured among others Barbara Windsor and Ronnie Knight, her then husband.

Pitman was the reporter on the BBC1 documentary The Ritz, produced by Edward Mirzoieff, which won the BAFTA Award for Best Documentary of 1981. Later in the 1980s he turned director, contributing documentaries to the 40 Minutes series. Among the best-remembered are "Separate Tables", about retired elderly ladies in a hotel in Eastbourne, "Two sides of a Street", about gentrification in a West London suburb, and the life of Jessie Matthews.

After leaving the BBC, he became an independent producer and was appointed series producer of An Inspector Calls on Channel 4 for Twenty Twenty Television. He also contributed as reporter to the Holiday programme on BBC One.

Pitman died on 14 February 2018 at the age of 78. That's Life! presenter Esther Rantzen described him as “the brother I never had”, adding: "He had an unerring instinct about people. He could sense what was really going on and his documentaries were full of humanity and insight, and really quirky." He is survived by his nephew, Steven, and niece, Carole.
