= Gavin Campbell =

Gavin Campbell may refer to:

- Gavin Campbell, 1st Marquess of Breadalbane (1851–1922), Scottish nobleman and Liberal politician
- Gavin Campbell, lead guitarist with Australian rock band 67 Special
- Gavin Campbell (music producer), Australian DJ and remixer
- Gavin Campbell (presenter) (born 1946), businessman and former television presenter

== Fictional characters ==
- Gavin Campbell (Home and Away), fictional character on the Australian soap opera Home and Away
