= Harold Williamson (journalist) =

English journalist

Harold Williamson (28 December 1922 – 11 March 2001) was an English journalist.

He was born at 38 Long Row, Colliery Row, Houghton-le-Spring, County Durham and was most notable for his work on the BBC current affairs/documentary series Man Alive and Braden's Week in the 1960s. He was particularly adept at interviewing children. His documentary feature Gale is Dead, focusing on a teenage heroin addict, won numerous awards in 1970, and was nominated for a BAFTA. He was the father of the television presenter and producer Trish Williamson.

He was a lifelong Christian, socialist, and Labour Party supporter who frequently returned to his pit-community roots by attending the Durham miners' gala.
