= Rebecca Wilcox =

British television presenter (born 1980)

- Born: 10 January 1980 (age 46); England
- Education: Somerville College, Oxford
- Occupation: Television presenter
- Years active: 2008–present
- Employer: BBC
- Spouse: Jim Moss (m. 2009)
- Children: 2
- Parent(s): Desmond Wilcox; Esther Rantzen

Rebecca Wilcox (born 10 January 1980) is a British television presenter, mainly for the BBC.

== Early life ==
The middle of three children born to journalist and television presenter Esther Rantzen and producer Desmond Wilcox, she has an older sister and younger brother. Wilcox was educated at Queen's College, London and Somerville College, Oxford, where she gained a degree in English Language and Literature.

== Career ==
Wilcox started as a television researcher, and then became an assistant producer on programmes such as ITV's Hell's Kitchen, and Cops with Cameras, along with Five's Trust Me – I'm A Holiday Rep.

She was first seen on camera as an undercover reporter on BBC Three's six-part series Conning the Conmen, and then supporting Gok Wan on Channel 4's How to Look Good Naked. In autumn 2007, Wilcox presented a biography on the British Formula One superstar Lewis Hamilton, Lewis Hamilton: Billion Dollar Man for BBC Three, which was later broadcast on BBC One.

In April 2009, she co-presented BBC Three's experimental series My Life as an Animal with Terry Nutkins. In July 2009, Wilcox appeared in a one-off, hour-long documentary aired on BBC Three, Mischief: Britain's Embarrassing Emissions. On 17 Sep 2014 she appeared with her mother, Esther Rantzen, in an episode of Celebrity Antiques Road Trip on BBC Two. She is currently a presenter on Watchdog and Your Money, Their Tricks.

== Personal life ==
In September 2009, Wilcox married auditor James "Jim" Moss. The couple live in London with their two sons.
