= The People of Paradise =

1960 British TV documentary series

- Genre: Documentary
- Presented by: David Attenborough
- Country of origin: United Kingdom
- Original language: English
- No. of seasons: 1
- No. of episodes: 6

Production
- Producer: David Attenborough
- Production location: "The South Seas"
- Cinematography: Geoff Mulligan
- Editor: Robert Walter
- Production company: BBC

Original release
- Network: BBC Television Service
- Release: 21 April – 26 May 1960

The People of Paradise (subtitled A Journey through the South Seas) is a six-part documentary film series produced and presented by David Attenborough. The series exhibits the people and geography of Oceania; particularly, of Fiji and Tonga. BBC Television Service (now BBC One) transmitted The People of Paradise in 1960.

David Attenborough wrote a book called Quest in Paradise which recounted both this adventure and Zoo Quest for Paradise Birds. In 1981 and 2018 it was republished with several other early Attenborough books with the 2018 edition known as Further Adventures of a Young Naturalist.

The year the series aired, Harper & Brothers published a corresponding book, People of Paradise, in the United States. Its Library of Congress catalog card number is 61-10234.

In 2012 the BBC released several of its archive programmes in the BBC Four Collections. In the collection Attenborough: The Early Years, compiled by Attenborough, the first 5 episodes of The Peoples of Paradise were included and are now permanently on BBC iPlayer. Why the final episode was not included is unknown.

== Episodes ==
David Attenborough was personally invited to the region by the reigning monarch of Tonga, Queen Salote, to attend the Tongan Royal Kava Ceremony.

On their way to Tonga, David and his team explore the South West Pacific, travelling to numerous islands and immersing themselves in this exotic culture.

=== 1. "The Land Divers of Pentecost" ===
Broadcast 21 April 1960. The journey starts at the islands of the New Hebrides. In Pentecost Island, David Attenborough marvels at a diving custom performed by male islanders. From a 100 ft (30m) tower vantage point platform, male islanders complete death-defying dry land diving stunts.

=== 2. "Cargo Cult" ===
Broadcast 28 April 1960. In Tanna, David interviews members of the John Frum cargo cult. The group's members take an unusual interest in radio signalling equipment, and they build intricate scarlet gates and crosses throughout the island and across the hazardous volcanic plains.

=== 3. "The Firewalkers of Fiji" ===
Broadcast 5 May 1960. David Attenborough meets the legendary firewalkers of Beqa island, Fiji, who captivated both himself and his crew.

=== 4. "Outer Islands of Fiji" ===
Broadcast 12 May 1960. On the volcanic island of Koro, David Attenborough meets a tribal leader who claims to have extraordinary powers over the creatures of the sea, being able to summon sharks and turtles from the depths of the ocean.

=== 5. "Canoes and Coconut Crabs" ===
Broadcast 19 May 1960. David Attenborough's tour of the South West Pacific reaches Kambara. There he searches for one of the last double canoes in Fiji, in which South Sea Islanders made their immense voyages across the Pacific.

The journey continues to Tonga, an island rich in coconut crabs and fruit bats. In the grounds of the Tongan Palace, David Attenborough meets Tu'i Malila, a tortoise from Madagascar presented to the Tongan Royal Family by Captain James Cook in July 1777.

=== 6. "Royal Tonga" ===
Broadcast 26 May 1960. David Attenborough witnesses the Royal Kava Ceremony that he is fortunate enough to attend whilst in Tonga.

Few Europeans have ever been permitted to see the regal splendour of this ancient and sacred ceremony, where the female sovereign herself takes part. Attenborough is given unprecedented access to the event and shares his tale.

== See also ==
- Archipelago
- Cargo cult
- Coconut crab
- Firewalking
