= The Silver Line =

Free telephone helpline for older people in the United Kingdom

- Founded: 2012
- Founder: Dame Esther Rantzen
- Region served: United Kingdom
- Services: Telephone helpline for older people
- Website: www.thesilverline.org.uk

The Silver Line is a free confidential telephone helpline offering information, friendship and advice to older people in the United Kingdom, available 24 hours a day. As of 1 October 2019 The Silver Line joined forces with Age UK to help more of the older people who are struggling with loneliness and isolation. The Silver Line is a subsidiary of Age UK.

== History ==
The helpline was established by Dame Esther Rantzen, who founded the children's helpline ChildLine in 1986. She wrote about her loneliness following the death of her husband Desmond Wilcox in 2000, and described loneliness among the elderly as "a creeping enemy" which "erodes confidence".

The CEO of The Silver Line is Sophie Andrews. The helpline is a charity registered in the UK (Registered Charity no 1147330 in England and Wales, registered in Scotland as charity number SCO44467. Company No 8000807)

== Objectives ==
The helpline aims to provide the following services:

- Offer information, friendship and advice
- Link callers to local groups and services
- Offer regular befriending calls
- Protect and support those who are suffering abuse and neglect

Callers may be directed to organisations such as Contact the Elderly, Samaritans, WRVS or the Townswomen's Guild.

== Regional pilot ==
A 12-month pilot of the helpline service covering the North of England, the Isle of Man and Jersey was launched in November 2012.

Initially the pilot was launched in Greater Manchester and the Isle of Man. However, funding from Comic Relief allowed an extension of the pilot to cover North East England and Jersey in 2013. 8,000 calls were answered during the pilot period, with the majority of callers aged between 60 and 80.

The pilot was greeted positively by most of the major charities and other organisations working in the field of elderly care. However, the head of Age Concern in Jersey initially said she liked the concept, but a new UK-based charity helpline would be confusing and unnecessary for the island. In fact the Jersey experience proved valuable not only in testing out ways of reaching the hardest-to-reach older people, but also by enabling them to call the helpline, in some calls revealing situations involving loneliness and abuse. Evaluated independently by the Centre for Social Justice, during the pilot period the helpline was found to have been transformational. One caller told the evaluation, "When I get off the phone I feel like I belong to the human race". Another said she no longer felt as if she had been "shuffled under the carpet." It was therefore launched nationally on 25 November 2013.

== National launch ==
The Silver Line launched nationally on 25 November 2013. Funding of £5 million was granted by the Big Lottery Fund, as part of their Dignity programme to provide services to older people who are isolated and lonely across the UK. This was intended to cover approximately half the costs of the first two years. The launch of the brand new service was widely covered in the media, especially on radio and television, throughout the day, culminating in a special feature on BBC's The One Show. This was in order to publicize the free, confidential telephone number 0800 4 70 80 90, which is now open 24/7 every day and night, including Christmas and the New Year.

To mark the launch, The Silver Line commissioned ComRes to conduct a survey into loneliness. Their findings can be extrapolated to a figure of 2.5 million older people (15%) feeling lonely often or all the time. 9 out of 10 said that the most effective remedy for loneliness is a chat on the telephone. However, since 84% said it is very difficult to admit to loneliness, even to members of their family because they do not wish to become a "burden", The Silver Line offers a general service of information, friendship and advice. The biggest single problem callers talk about is loneliness.

11,000 calls were received in the first two weeks following the national launch.

== Current operations ==
As well as running the helpline, The Silver Line has 3,000 volunteer "Silver Line Friends" who make regular friendship calls with older people. It also offers Silver Circles (facilitated group calls for people who share a common interest). The Silver Line also makes a further 1,500 ‘keeping in touch’ calls every week to isolated older people. In November 2015, it launched Silver Line Connects to provide older people with more intensive support, advice, and help with connecting to local services.

On 21 June 2019, the helpline received its 2.5 millionth call, reaching this figure in less than six years since its national launch. The helpline currently receives around 10,000 calls a week, two thirds of them are received at night-time and weekends, when no other helpline is available specifically for older people who may be lonely, isolated or confused, while 85% of callers each month are contacting The Silver Line for the first time.

In December 2016, the charity announced that the helpline had moved into its own offices in Blackpool where staff directly employed by The Silver Line handle calls from all parts of the United Kingdom.

On 17 July 2017, it was announced that the Duchess of Cornwall had become Patron of the charity.

As of 1 October 2019 The Silver Line joined forces with Age UK to help more of the older people who are struggling with loneliness and isolation. The Silver Line is a subsidiary of Age UK and still has its own brand, registered charity number, Board of Trustees and CEO.

== Evaluation of the Silver Line ==
In November 2016, Anglia Ruskin University published an evaluation into the work of The Silver Line. The report showed that the charity is succeeding in reaching lonely people. It found that over one in three people who are supported by the friendship service (in which they are matched by a like-minded volunteer) record positive scores and a decrease of feelings of loneliness when engaging with the service.
