= Esther Rantzen =

English journalist and presenter (1940–2026)

Dame Esther Rantzen DBE MStJ
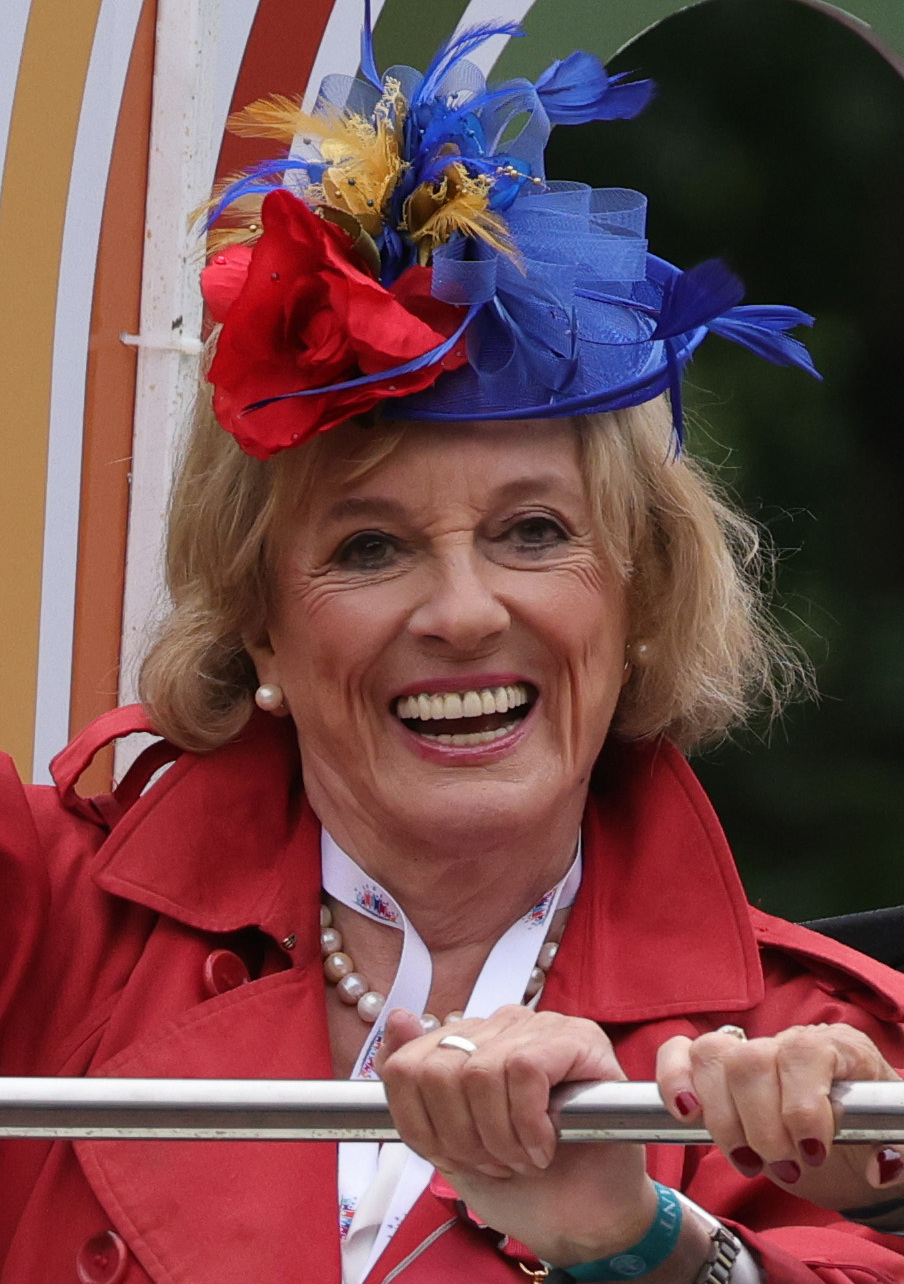
- Rantzen in 2022
- Born: Esther Louise Rantzen; 22 June 1940; Berkhamsted, Hertfordshire, England
- Died: 30 September 2026 (aged 86); New Forest, Hampshire, England
- Education: Somerville College, Oxford
- Occupations: Journalist; television presenter
- Years active: 1968–2026
- Television: That's Life! (1973–1994)
- Spouse: Desmond Wilcox (m. 1977; died 2000)
- Children: 3, including Rebecca Wilcox

Dame Esther Louise Rantzen (22 June 1940 – 30 September 2026) was an English journalist and television presenter who presented the BBC television series That's Life! for 21 years, from 1973 until 1994. She worked with various charitable causes and founded the charities Childline, a helpline for children, in 1986, and The Silver Line, designed to combat loneliness in older people's lives, in 2012.

Rantzen was recognised for her contribution to television and society. She was appointed an OBE for services to broadcasting in 1991 and a CBE for services to children in 2006, and in the 2015 New Year Honours was made a dame for services to children and older people through Childline and The Silver Line. She was also a patron of a number of charities and remained president of Childline until her death in 2026. Rantzen worked closely with the campaigning organisation Dignity in Dying.

== Early life ==
Esther Louise Rantzen was born in Berkhamsted, Hertfordshire, England, to Katherine Flora Rantzen (née Leverson) and Henry Barnato Rantzen, an electrical engineer. Her family is Jewish. She had one younger sister. She attended Buckley Country Day School in New York, leaving in 1952. She was educated at North London Collegiate School, an all-girls independent school in Edgware, North London. She studied English at Somerville College, Oxford, where the Principal was Dame Janet Vaughan and one of her tutors was Mary Lascelles. At Oxford she performed with the Oxford University Dramatic Society (OUDS), became Secretary of the Experimental Theatre Club (ETC) and joined the Oxford Theatre Group, performing in Oxford and Edinburgh.

Rantzen was the subject of an episode of Who Do You Think You Are? on 3 September 2008 (series 5 episode 4). Her paternal line was traced back, as far as the 1760s, to an established Jewish neighbourhood in Warsaw. Tracing Rantzen's forebears was greatly helped by the rarity of the surname "Rantzen" (even in Warsaw) and the survival of records in Warsaw. In the late 1850s, her great-great-grandfather emigrated to Britain and settled, as a cap-maker, in Spitalfields, a slum district of London's East End. Rantzen's great-grandfather moved to a more comfortable neighbourhood with the help of his brother-in-law, Barney Barnato (born Barnett Isaacs), who had become extremely wealthy as the owner of the Kimberley Diamond Mine in South Africa. Her father's middle name was Barnato. On her wealthy maternal side, Rantzen's great-grandfather, Montague Leverson, was one of the founders of the West London Synagogue. Montague Leverson was the maternal grandfather of British composer Gerald Finzi. Rantzen was also related to Ada Leverson, a British writer and friend of Oscar Wilde, who was portrayed by Zoë Wanamaker in the 1997 film Wilde. She was first cousin once removed of the novelist and translator Michael Meyer.

== Career ==
=== BBC ===
After training in secretarial skills, Rantzen was recruited by BBC Radio as a trainee sound effects assistant. She began her television career as a clerk in the programme planning department, then obtained her first production job working as a researcher on the BBC1 late-night satire programme BBC-3 (1965–1966). Having worked as a researcher on a number of current affairs programmes, she moved to the award-winning BBC2 documentary series Man Alive in the mid-1960s.

In 1968, Rantzen, at the time a researcher for Braden's Week (hosted by Bernard Braden), became a presenter because the producer of the programme decided to put the researchers onscreen. Braden decided to return to his native Canada in 1972, to present a similar TV show there; the following year, the BBC replaced Braden's Week with That's Life! with Rantzen as the main presenter.

That's Life! ran on BBC1 for 21 years from 1973 to 1994 and became one of the most popular shows on British television, reaching audiences of more than 18 million. During that time, it expanded the traditional role of the consumer programme from simply exposing faulty washing machines and dodgy salesmen, to investigating life-and-death issues, such as a campaign for more organ donors, which featured Ben Hardwick, a two-year-old dying of liver disease whose only hope was a transplant. Also included was the investigation of Crookham Court boarding school near Newbury, described as "dirty and depressing" with unsatisfactory teaching standards, the owner of which was a paedophile who employed several paedophile teachers. The school was closed and the owner and two members of staff were convicted of sexual offences against pupils as a result of That's Life! publicising the issues. In 1993, Rantzen sued The People for libel after they printed false information about her investigation of the school. Rantzen was awarded £110,000 in damages.

In 1976, Rantzen devised the documentary series The Big Time, which launched Sheena Easton's singing career.

=== Childline ===
That's Life! was influential in many different ways, not least in the introduction of the videolink for child witnesses in court procedures, and it was responsible for the launch of Childline in 1986, the first national helpline for children in danger or distress. Rantzen had suggested the Childwatch programme to BBC1 Controller Michael Grade after the death of a toddler who had starved to death, locked in a bedroom. The aim of the programme was to find better ways of detecting children at risk of abuse; to that end, viewers of That's Life! who had themselves experienced cruelty as children were asked to take part in a survey detailing the circumstances of their abuse.

Rantzen suggested that after that edition of That's Life!, the BBC should open a helpline for children, in case any young viewers suffering current abuse wished to ring in to ask for help. The helpline was open for 48 hours, during which it was swamped with calls, mainly from children suffering sexual abuse they had never been able to disclose to anyone else. This gave Rantzen the idea for a specific helpline for children in distress or danger, to be open 24/7 throughout the year, the first of its kind in the world. The Childwatch team consulted child care professionals, who agreed that children would use such a helpline, but said it would be impossible to create. Nevertheless, the team obtained funding from the Department of Health and the Variety Club of Great Britain, both of which donated £25,000. Ian Skipper OBE, a noted philanthropist who had already helped Rantzen set up a special fund in memory of Ben Hardwick, agreed to underwrite the helpline's running costs for the first year. Rantzen and the team went to BT to ask for premises for the charity and for a simple freephone number, both of which were provided.

The Childwatch programme screened on 30 October 1986 and based on the results of the survey, launched Childline with a specially written jingle (by B. A. Robertson) which featured the free phone number 0800 1111. On that first night in October 1986, fifty thousand attempted calls were made to the helpline. Childline now has twelve bases around the UK, including two in Northern Ireland, two in Scotland and two in Wales, plus a virtual on-line base. Childline merged with the NSPCC in 2006, enabling it to expand in an effort to meet demand. The helpline has now been copied in 150 countries.

=== The Silver Line ===
In 2013, Rantzen set up The Silver Line, a charity to benefit elderly people, by combating isolation and loneliness, to provide information and advice and to offer a free confidential helpline. In addition, The Silver Line offers a telephone befriending service, in which trained volunteers make regular weekly calls to older people. It merged with Age UK in October 2019.

=== Later career ===
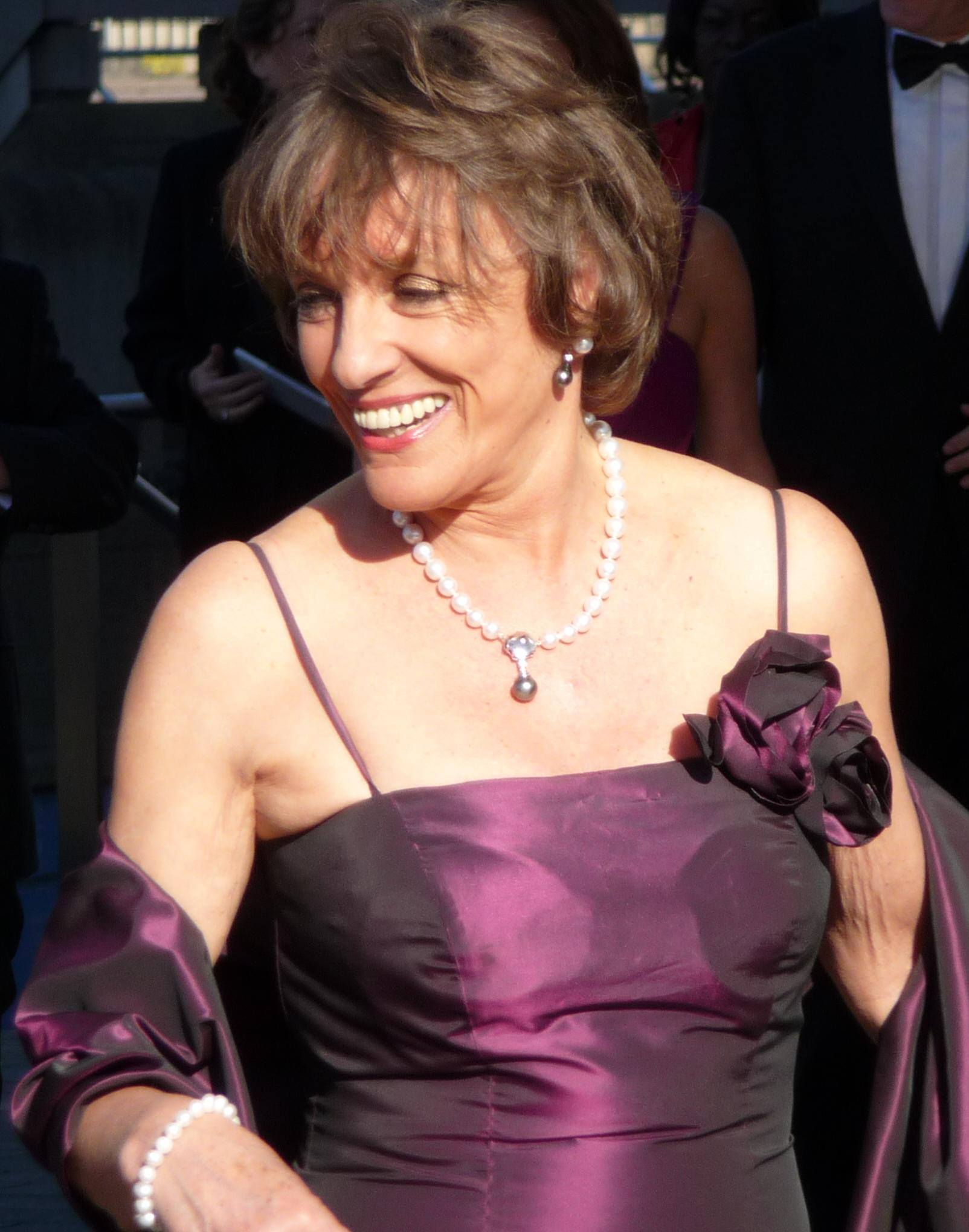
Rantzen at the 2009 British Academy Television Awards

In 1988, Rantzen created a BBC One television series called Hearts of Gold, celebrating people who had performed unsung acts of outstanding kindness or courage.

After That's Life! finished its 21-year run in 1994, Rantzen presented her own talk show, Esther, on BBC Two from 1994 to 2002. In 2004, Rantzen was a contestant on the second series of the BBC celebrity dance competition Strictly Come Dancing. She was paired with Anton Du Beke, and they were the third couple to be eliminated.

In 2006, Rantzen took part in the BBC Two programmes Would Like to Meet and Excuse My French, and was selected to present a new consumer affairs show with former Watchdog presenter Lynn Faulds Wood, under the title Old Dogs New Tricks. She made a documentary for ITV, called Winton's Children about Sir Nicholas Winton, who (as was first revealed on That's Life!) had rescued a generation of Czech children from The Holocaust and was later nominated for the Nobel Peace Prize. Following the death of Rantzen's husband, film-maker Desmond Wilcox, she made a landmark programme on palliative care, How to Have a Good Death, for BBC Two. She campaigned on behalf of hospice care and better care for the elderly and terminally ill, and also campaigned to raise awareness of ME/CFS (chronic fatigue syndrome), as her elder daughter has suffered from the condition. She created the 'Children of Courage' segment for the BBC's Children in Need programme, and the series The Big Time which discovered singer Sheena Easton.

In 2016, Rantzen was made an Honorary Fellow of Somerville College, University of Oxford.

In addition to her television career, as a patron or vice-president of 55 charities, Rantzen mainly concentrated on working for children, vulnerable older people and disabled people. Much of her voluntary effort was for Childline as a volunteer counsellor on the helpline, and as a fund-raiser and spokesperson for children, and latterly working to set up The Silver Line, the new helpline for isolated and vulnerable older people. Childline currently has 12 centres around the UK, plus one virtual on-line base,1,500 volunteer counsellors and answers around a million calls and on-line contacts from children each year. Rantzen chaired Childline's board of trustees for twenty years, and since Childline merged with the NSPCC in 2006, she served as a Trustee of the NSPCC, as well as being President of Childline. In 2013, she also became the vice-president of Revitalise, a charity providing those with disabilities, and their careers, with short breaks and holidays.

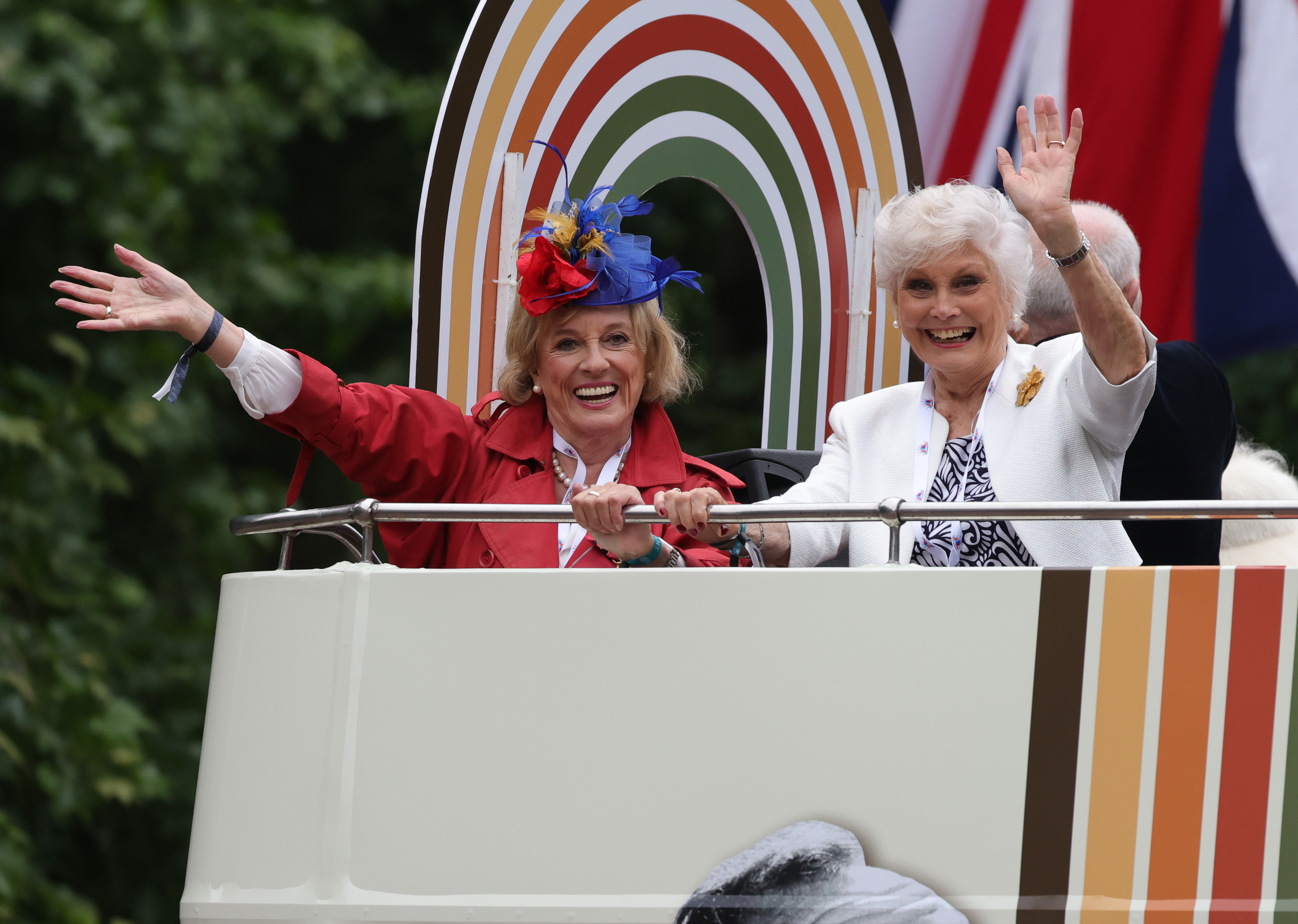
Rantzen with Angela Rippon during the Queen Elizabeth II Platinum Jubilee 2022

Rantzen appeared in the 2008 series of ITV show I'm a Celebrity...Get Me Out of Here!, and was the fifth celebrity to leave the camp.

In 2016, Rantzen was in the first episode of Celebrity First Dates.

In 2018, Rantzen presented a new Channel 5 consumer advice show called Esther Rantzen's House Trap, a 4-part series similar to BBC's long-running Watchdog programme, with hidden cameras trying to trap rogue traders in the homes of a number of undercover actors. Unlike Watchdog, these actors were all people of an advanced age with each episode focusing on a different trade, such as locksmiths, where older people were likely to being preyed upon.

=== Political career ===
On 26 May 2009, on Stephen Rhodes's BBC Three Counties Breakfast Show, Rantzen announced her intention to stand as an independent candidate for Parliament, if the incumbent Labour MP Margaret Moran stood for Luton South again. This statement was made against the backdrop of the Parliamentary expenses scandal and Moran's expense claims for £23,000 to eliminate dry rot in her second home in Southampton. Two days later, Moran announced she would not stand at the next general election, but Rantzen said she was still considering standing herself and confirmed her candidacy on 28 July 2009. Rantzen stood for election in Luton South against eleven other candidates, of whom four were independent. At the May 2010 election, Rantzen came fourth with 4.4% of the vote, behind the three main parties. In accordance with UK parliamentary electoral process, Rantzen lost her deposit, as only candidates receiving over 5% of the total votes cast have their deposit returned. Labour Party candidate Gavin Shuker won the seat with 34.9% of the vote, the Conservatives got 29.4% and the Liberal Democrats 22.7%.

In August 2014, Rantzen was one of 200 public figures who were signatories to a letter to The Guardian expressing their hope that Scotland would vote against independence from the United Kingdom in the referendum on that issue.

=== Relationship with Jimmy Savile ===
In Exposure: The Other Side of Jimmy Savile, broadcast on 3 October 2012, Rantzen, after seeing the interviews the programme contains, supported the women abused by the BBC broadcaster Jimmy Savile. Rantzen told Channel 4 News: "If anybody had had concrete evidence, I think and hope the police would have been called in. But all they had was gossip – and gossip isn't evidence." Abuse campaigner Shy Keenan, writing in The Sun newspaper, subsequently claimed that, using a different name, she had told Rantzen 18 years earlier of allegations that she had heard about Savile. Rantzen denied hearing specific allegations and said she had no recollection of a conversation with Keenan. Writing for The Daily Telegraph before the broadcast, Katy Brand also criticised Rantzen for failing to act on rumours she had heard about Savile. Pete Saunders, chief executive of the National Association for People Abused in Childhood, at Keenan's request, temporarily asked for all references to Rantzen to be removed from the charity's website, but subsequently defended Rantzen and said she would continue as a patron.

== Personal life ==
In 1966, at the age of 26, Rantzen had an affair with the Scottish politician Nicholas Fairbairn.

In 1968, Rantzen started an affair with Desmond Wilcox, who was the head of her department and married to Rantzen's friend Patsy who also worked at the BBC. After several years they decided to live together, and informed BBC management of their relationship. Management's solution was to move the entire production team of That's Life! out of Wilcox's department. The new arrangement meant that Rantzen and Patsy were now working in the same department, embarrassing Rantzen and causing further pain to Patsy. Patsy Wilcox had always refused to divorce her husband, but agreed when Rantzen became pregnant. After Rantzen and Wilcox married in December 1977, BBC management moved her back into the General Features department run by him. By that time, That's Life! was achieving huge audience ratings and reaching the number one position, gaining more viewers than Coronation Street. This created tension among colleagues in General Features, who ascribed the success of the programme to Wilcox's relationship with Rantzen. They complained to management, quoting the BBC's regulation that husbands and wives should not work in the same department.

As a result, Wilcox resigned, and set up his own independent production company, making award-winning documentaries such as The Visit, which included a series of programmes about The Boy David. For these, as well as previous films, he received many international awards, including the Grierson Lifetime Achievement Award in 2001. Wilcox and Rantzen had three children including Rebecca.

In 2001, Patsy's daughter Cassandra Wilcox gave an interview in response to comments Rantzen had made about Patsy in her autobiography, alleging amongst other things that Rantzen had long harboured animosity towards Patsy.

=== Health and death ===
In January 2023, Rantzen announced that she had been diagnosed with lung cancer. In a statement, Rantzen said, "In the last few weeks I have discovered that I am suffering from lung cancer which has now spread. At the moment I am undergoing various tests, to assess the best treatment ... I have decided not to keep this secret anymore because I find it difficult to skulk around various hospitals wearing an unconvincing disguise, and because I would rather you heard the facts from me.... As I am sure you will understand, while I am awaiting the results of the tests, I am unable to answer questions. Thanks to the extraordinary skills of the medical profession there are wonderful new treatments, so I am remaining optimistic."

In May 2023, Rantzen announced that her lung cancer had reached stage IV and that she was on a new form of medication. In December 2023, in an article in The Times, she reflected on her mortality. On 19 December 2023, she said that she had joined the Dignitas assisted dying clinic in Switzerland. On 2 February 2026, it was announced that a drug she had been taking since 2024 had stopped working, and she stated: "I'm definitely not going to live long enough to see the assisted dying bill become law." On 10 September 2026, Rantzen stated that she had become "too physically fragile to make the journey and go through the Dignitas process".

Rantzen died surrounded by her family at her home in the New Forest, on 30 September 2026, aged 86. Her children announced her death in a statement describing her as "the most wonderful mother" and a "cherished grandmother". They said that her legacy would live on through Childline and The Silver Line, and that she was "finally at rest with her beloved husband, Desmond Wilcox".

Tributes followed from across broadcasting, journalism and the charitable sector. BBC Director-General Matt Brittin described Rantzen as a "legend of British broadcasting", while the NSPCC praised her as the founder of Childline and highlighted the millions of children supported by the service since its foundation in 1986. Age UK paid tribute to her work with The Silver Line, while the Society of Editors praised her contribution to journalism, broadcasting and campaigning. Among individual tributes, Elaine Paige called her a great broadcaster, journalist and campaigner; Lorraine Kelly described her as a pioneer and "force of nature"; Davina McCall said she had made the world a better place; Martin Lewis called her an inspiration and pioneer; and Anton Du Beke, who partnered Rantzen on Strictly Come Dancing in 2004, described her as a friend, mentor and "ultimate breaker of the glass ceiling". Other tributes came from Nicky Campbell, Richard E. Grant and television presenter Anna Williamson, while Labour MP Kim Leadbeater described Rantzen as a strong, warm and compassionate woman and praised her campaigning for people with terminal illnesses. Prime Minister Andy Burnham said that she had "changed countless lives" and given a voice to people who might otherwise have gone unheard.

== Bibliography ==
- Esther Rantzen; Desmond Wilcox (1981). Kill the Chocolate Biscuit Or, Behind the Screen. Pan Books. ISBN 978-0330-2653-24.
- Esther Rantzen; Desmond Wilcox (1985). Baby Love. Michael Joseph. ISBN 978-0718-1263-53.
- Esther Rantzen; Shaun Woodward (1985). Ben: The Story of Ben Hardwick. Penguin Character Books. ISBN 0-563-20331-5.
- Esther Rantzen; Shaun Woodward (1999). Death by Television. Century. ISBN 0-7126-2543-7.
- Esther Rantzen (1978). That's Life!. Arthur Barker. ISBN 0-213-166712.
- Esther Rantzen (2001). Esther: The Autobiography. Chivers Press. ISBN 978-0754-0248-97.
- Esther Rantzen (2004). A Secret Life. Penguin Random House. ISBN 978-0099-4359-38.
- Esther Rantzen (2008). If Not Now, When? Living the Baby Boomer Adventure. Headline Springboard. ISBN 978-0-7553-1719-6.
- Esther Rantzen (2011). Running Out of Tears: The Moving Personal Stories of Childline's Children Over 25 Years. Biteback Publishing. ISBN 9781783340866.
- Esther Rantzen (2016). Make Do and Send: Nostalgic Letters on Fifteen Years of Rationing in Britain. Gibson Square. ISBN 978-0-7553-1719-6.
- Esther Rantzen (2023). Older and Bolder: My A–Z of Surviving Almost Everything. Ebury Publishing Press. ISBN 978-1529-9081-90.

== Honours ==
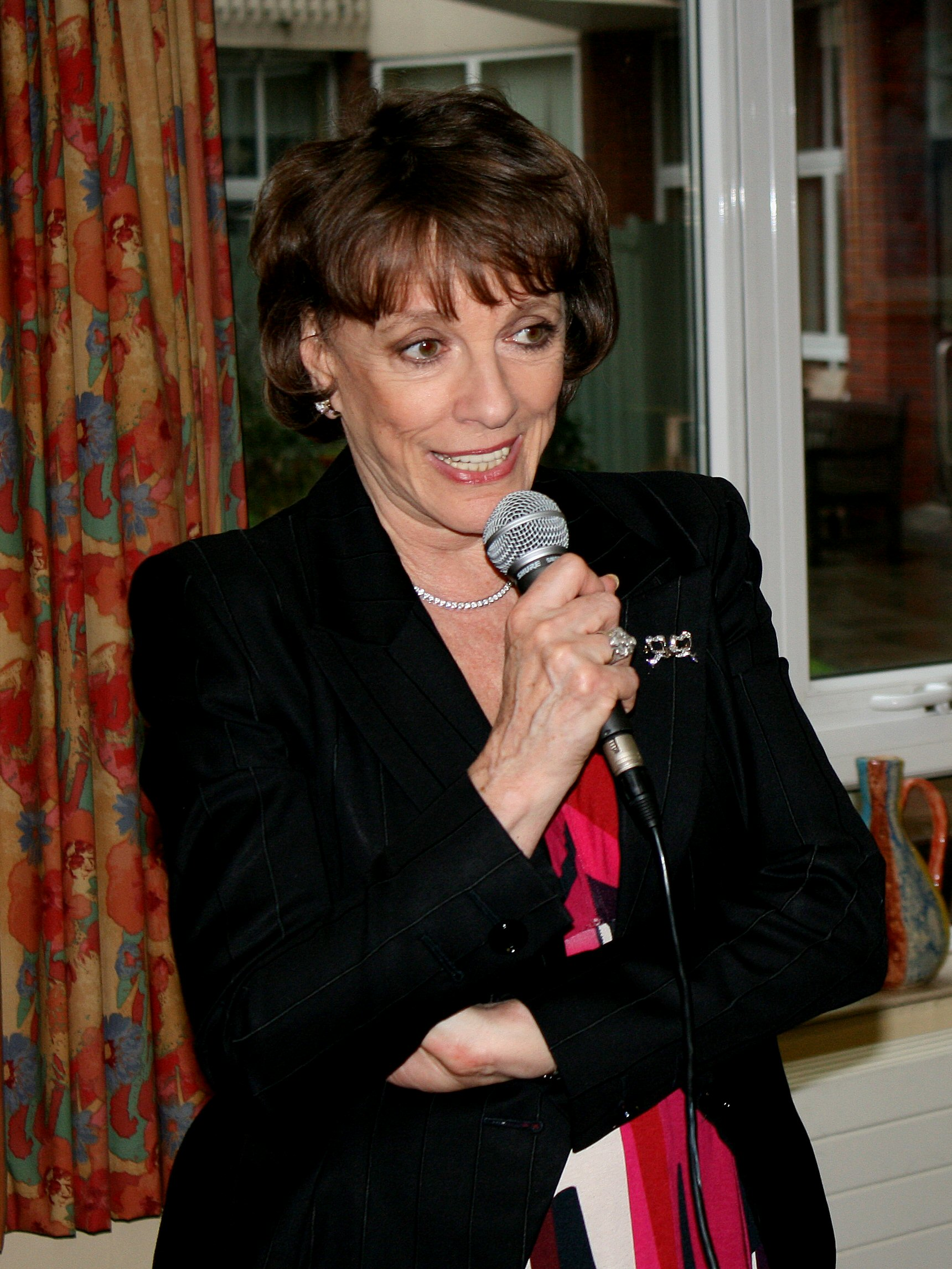
Rantzen at the Nightingale House in San Francisco, California in 2011

Rantzen was appointed Officer of the Order of the British Empire (OBE) in the 1991 New Year Honours for services to broadcasting, Commander of the Order of the British Empire (CBE) in the 2006 Birthday Honours for services to children and young people, and Dame Commander of the Order of the British Empire (DBE) in the 2015 New Year Honours for services to children and older people through Childline and The Silver Line. She was also appointed Member of the Order of St John (MStJ) in 1991.

She also received a number of professional awards, including a Lifetime Achievement Award from the Women in Film and Television organisation, the Royal Television Society's Special Judges' Award for Journalism, their Fellowship, and Membership of their Hall of Fame. She was the first woman to receive a Dimbleby Award from BAFTA for factual presentation. She received the Snowdon Award for services to disabled people.

Rantzen was an Honorary Fellow of Somerville College, Oxford.

=== Arms ===
On 31 May 2018, Rantzen was granted arms by the College of Arms, through Letters Patent of Garter and Clarenceux Kings of Arms.

Coat of arms of Esther Rantzen
Escutcheon Azure on a Pile Argent the point surmounted by the Flame proper of a Candle Or a Trumpet palewise the Bell upwards Gules between two Roses also Gules barbed seeded slipped and leaved proper. Motto IF NOT NOW WHEN Orders Order of the British Empire circlet (Appointed DBE 2015)

== Sources ==
- "Rantzen—NI 'Addicted to Hatred'". BBC News. 19 June 2009.
- Rantzen, Esther (2001). Esther: The Autobiography. London: BBC Worldwide. ISBN 0-563-53741-8. OCLC 45766503.
- Smyth, Lisa (20 June 2009). "Ulster Folk Addicted to Violence, Rants Esther". Belfast Telegraph. Archived from the original on 6 June 2011.
