= Gavin Campbell (presenter) =

British business man and TV presenter (born 1946)

- Born: 17 March 1946 (age 80); Letchworth, Hertfordshire, United Kingdom
- Citizenship: United Kingdom
- Education: Central School of Speech and Drama
- Occupation: Actor

Gavin Charles Alexander Campbell (born 17 March 1946) is a businessman and a former actor and television presenter, mostly known for his stint on That's Life! from 1982 until the show ended in 1994.

== Early life ==
Campbell was born in Letchworth in Hertfordshire, where he grew up. His father was a welder, and his mother later became involved in the women's peace movement. He was educated at St Christopher School, a boarding independent school in the town of Letchworth Garden City in Hertfordshire, followed by the Central School of Speech and Drama in London.

== Career ==
=== Actor ===
Campbell began his career as an actor from 1970–71. He was an actor for 15 years. He played the part of Spencer Bodily in a 1970 episode of Department S. He also played the part of a motorcycle policeman in the 1971 film adaptation of the TV sitcom On The Buses and Inspector Harry Morgan in the 1978 film The Playbirds.

=== Presenter ===
Campbell was a presenter on the BBC consumer television show That's Life!. Around 1983 That's Life was attracting 19 million viewers.

In the 1997 general election Campbell presented a video for the Referendum Party, seeking the United Kingdom's withdrawal from the European Union. Five million copies of a VHS cassette with the video were sent to households in target constituencies.

Campbell ran a company called One Hand Clapping Ltd from 1998–2002 with his wife.

Until 2001, he worked for the Money Channel, which later went bankrupt.

In 2001 he wrote a personal finance column for The Mail on Sunday.

Since 2003, Campbell has been part of a company called First Growth Direct, based in Lew Trenchard in Devon, which imports wine. Before becoming an actor he had worked as a plongeur in Paris. He has a house in France at Auxerre. He had been a wine director at Berry Brothers and Rudd of London.
