= Just Another Day (TV series) =

- Just Another Day title sequence
- Genre: Documentary
- Starring: John Pitman
- Country of origin: United Kingdom
- Original language: English
- No. of series: 3
- No. of episodes: 20

Production
- Producers: Adam Clapham; Henry Murray
- Running time: 30 minutes

Original release
- Network: BBC2
- Release: 15 March 1983 – 29 December 1986

Just Another Day is a BBC documentary series, shown over twenty thirty minute episodes. The series follows John Pitman observing a typical day in the life of places, businesses and institutions that are considered part of the British way of life.

The episodes consisted of Pitman (who was always off-camera) shadowing a member of staff in the particular profession whilst they went about their particular job, combined with "fly on the wall" segments of other aspects and challenges of the profession (with Pitman narrating).

The basic format of Just Another Day was later developed and expanded in the late 1990s with the so-called "docusoap" (notable BBC examples included Airline and Driving School) which serialised the events and lives of employees within a particular profession or situation.

== Series overview ==
Series	Episodes	Originally released	
Series	Episodes	First released	Last released
1	6	15 March 1983	19 April 1983
2	8	22 February 1985	19 April 1985
3	6	14 November 1986	19 December 1986

== Episodes ==
=== Series 1 (1983) ===
No. overall	No. in series	Title	Directed by	Original release date	Ref
1	1	"Battersea Dogs' Home"	Peter Grimsdale	15 March 1983	
2	2	"Traffic Wardens"	Michael Waldman	22 March 1983	
3	3	"Selfridges"	Adam Curtis	29 March 1983	
4	4	"Waterloo Station"	Kevin Lygo	5 April 1983	TBA
5	5	"Sotheby's Upstairs"	Laurence Rees	12 April 1983	TBA
6	6	"The Seaside"	Adam Curtis	19 April 1983	

=== Series 2 (1985) ===
No. overall	No. in series	Title	Directed by	Original release date	Ref
7	1	"The Hospital for Sick Children"	Anne Webber	22 February 1985	
8	2	"Driving School"	Desmond Lapsley	1 March 1985	
9	3	"Soho"	Mogen Sutton	8 March 1985	
10	4	"The Natural History Museum"	John Paul Davidson	15 March 1985	
11	5	"Cross-Channel Ferry"	Anne Morrison	22 March 1985	
12	6	"The Tower of London"	Sarah Caplin	29 March 1985	
13	7	"Richmond Park"	Laura Gavshon	12 April 1985	
14	8	"Moving"	Nick Handel	19 April 1985	

=== Series 3 (1986) ===
No. overall	No. in series	Title	Directed by	Original release date	Ref
15	1	"EastEnders"	Roger Mills	14 November 1986	
16	2	"Heathrow"	Desmond Lapsley	21 November 1986	
17	3	"The Blue Cross Hospital for Sick Animals"	Pat Holland	28 November 1986	
18	4	"AA"	Linda Cleeve	5 December 1986	
19	5	"Greyhound Racing"	Pat Holland	12 December 1986	
20	6	"Fairford a Cotswold Town"	Betty McBride	19 December 1986	
