= Desmond Wilcox =

English documentary filmmaker (1931–2000)

- Wilcox in 1974
- Born: Desmond John Wilcox; 21 May 1931; Welwyn Garden City, Hertfordshire, England
- Died: 6 September 2000 (aged 69); Paddington, London, England
- Education: Cheltenham Grammar School; Christ's College, Finchley
- Occupations: Television producer, filmmaker, journalist, television executive
- Spouses: Patsy Price (m. 1954; div. 1977) Esther Rantzen (m. 1977)
- Children: 6, including Rebecca

Desmond John Wilcox (21 May 1931 – 6 September 2000) was an English television producer, documentary filmmaker, journalist and television executive. He worked at the BBC and ITV during his career and was producer of series such as This Week, Man Alive and That's Life!

== Early life ==
Wilcox was born in 1931 in Welwyn Garden City, Hertfordshire. His father was John Wallace Wilcox, a partner in an architectural firm and formerly a second lieutenant in the Royal Engineers. Wilcox's mother was Alice May, née Whittle. He attended Cheltenham Grammar School and Christ's College, Finchley. He was then a training apprentice with the Outward Bound Sea School and left home to work as a deckhand in the merchant marine.

== Career ==
In 1949, Wilcox began a career in journalism as a reporter on a weekly newspaper. After two years of national service, he moved to Fleet Street to work for the Daily Mirror, becoming a foreign correspondent in the New York bureau.

In 1960, Wilcox moved to television as a reporter on ITV's This Week current affairs programme, where he stayed for five years until joining the BBC.

He was co-editor and presenter of the landmark Man Alive series in 1965. He later formed the Man Alive Unit as well as providing the distinctive voice-over in the weekly current-affairs programme TEMPO directed by Mike Hodges.

In an interview in 1986 he said:

Real life honestly portrayed is sufficiently dramatic in itself. The idea that might lurk in some people's minds that you somehow have to beef it up or pump it up or invent the circumstances to make it more colourful, is an idea born of Fleet Street and ignorance.

From 1972 to 1980, Wilcox was head of general features at the BBC. He made series including Americans, The Visit, Black in Blue and A Day in the Life.

He wrote the book Explorers (BBC, 1975), based upon the BBC television series of the same name, about the journeys of ten explorers.

== Personal life ==
Wilcox married Patsy Price and they had three children: Claire, Adam and Cassandra. During his marriage he had an eight-year affair with television presenter Esther Rantzen; in 1977 he married Rantzen after obtaining a divorce from Price. There were three further children from this marriage, including the television presenter Rebecca Wilcox. In 1992, Wilcox converted to Judaism, the religion of his second wife.

== Later life and death ==
After he left the staff of the BBC, Wilcox was involved in the occasional series The Boy David, following the story of David Jackson (David Lopez), a badly deformed Peruvian boy (a sufferer of noma) whose face was rebuilt by a Scottish surgeon who adopted him. The series won six international awards.

In 2023, in the ITV1 drama The Long Shadow Wilcox was portrayed by the actor Adam James.

Wilcox died of a heart attack in Paddington, London, on 6 September 2000, at the age of 69.

== Awards ==
Wilcox was posthumously awarded the Grierson Documentary Film Awards Life Tribute in November 2001. A media arts centre at a High School in Rainhill, Merseyside, was named in his honour.

== Coat of arms ==
Coat of arms of Desmond Wilcox
Notes On May 31, 2018 he was granted these arms by the College of Arms, through Letters Patent of Garter and Clarenceux Kings of Arms. Crest Upon a Helm with a Wreath Argent and Azure Within a Circlet of Oak Leaves erect Vert a Horse rampant Or. Mantled Azure doubled Or. Escutcheon Argent a Pile reversed bendwise Gules the point surmounted in dexter chief by a Sun in Splendour overall a three-masted Schooner in full sail Or the hull charged with a Barrulet Azure fracted with Portholes Or. Motto Amor Vincit Omnia (Love Conquers All)

== Sources ==
- Esther Rantzen, The Autobiography, BBC Worldwide, 2001
