= Shy Keenan =

British author and activist

Shy Keenan (also known as Karen Wootton and Karen Claridge) is a British author, child sexual abuse survivor, and founder of Phoenix Survivors, an advocacy group for victims of sexual abuse. Keenan is known for her biography Broken, in which she discusses the long-term and extreme sexual abuse she experienced from her stepfather, Stanley Claridge. In 2014 the book was temporarily withdrawn from distribution by its publisher, Hodder & Stoughton. For her work with sexual abuse victims, Keenan received a Women of the Year award in 2008.

In 2013, Keenan's fourteen-year-old son, Ayden Olson, was discovered dead within his home, having committed suicide. Keenan has maintained that her son was "bullied to death" and has started a campaign called "Ayden's Law" that requests that the prime minister create a new anti-bullying law.

== Sexual abuse ==
Keenan states that Claridge began sexually abusing and raping her when she was three or four years old and continued the abuse until she was fourteen. Claridge also ran a prostitution ring, selling Keenan and other girls to various paedophiles. One encounter at age 10 left her with a fractured skull and Claridge kept Keenan and others from escaping by telling them that he had murdered various people and buried them under the house. Keenan later escaped Claridge and lived on the streets, and at one point attempted suicide.

Keenan later participated in an investigation into Claridge with journalist Sarah Macdonald. Macdonald stated that Keenan had "sent an explicit and disgusting tape recording of her father talking about abusing children to the police and social services - they did nothing." For the investigation Keenan was sent into Claridge's house in an attempt to get him to talk about the sexual abuse. The investigation was successful and Claridge and two other men were sent to jail for sexual abuse charges. Keenan later asked for a public inquiry into Wirral Social Services for "failing to protect her".

== Bibliography ==
- Broken (2008) ISBN 978-0-340-93744-0
- Children Betrayed (2010) ISBN 978-0-340-93747-1
- The Stolen Ones (2011) ISBN 978-0-340-97866-5
