= Man Alive (British TV series) =

- Genre: Documentary and current affairs
- Theme music composer: Tony Hatch
- Country of origin: United Kingdom
- Original language: English
- No. of episodes: Approx. 500

Production
- Editors: Bill Morton; Desmond Wilcox
- Running time: 30 minutes
- Production company: BBC TV

Original release
- Network: BBC2
- Release: 4 November 1965 – 6 June 1982

Related
- 40 Minutes; Man Alive Debate

Man Alive is a documentary and current affairs series which ran on BBC2 between 1965 and 1982. During that time there were nearly 500 programmes tackling a range of social and political issues, both in the UK and abroad.

The series was commissioned by David Attenborough, while he was Controller of BBC2 between 1965 and 1969. British television journalist and presenter Esther Rantzen worked on Man Alive in the mid-1960s. One of the programme's reporters and series editor was Desmond Wilcox, whom Rantzen later married. Wilcox contributed directly to about 50 Man Alive programmes. The Man Alive theme music was composed and played by Tony Hatch and his orchestra.

== History ==
The first Man Alive programme, "The Heart Man", was broadcast on 4 November 1965. It focused on heart surgeon Michael Ellis DeBakey at The Methodist Hospital in Houston, Texas. There were a further eight programmes that year, at this stage Wilcox was also the programme's executive producer. Each edition of the programme had a sub-title which reflected its content.

Man Alive returned in 1966 with 48 programmes followed by 51 in 1967. They were expanded in length from thirty to fifty minutes and started to be broadcast in colour. They were shot on 16 mm film, sometimes combined with studio discussions or outside broadcasts. The documentary strand covered several stories on sex, the sex industry and exploitation, and in 1967 it broke new ground by showing the first ever bare female breast on British television. For its time, Man Alive tackled many thought-provoking subjects. The programme also faced criticism. Writing in The Times in 2005, Paul Hoggart said the "landmark 1960s documentary strand Man Alive was accused at the time of cynical sensationalism, with producers rejoicing when they got some poor sod to weep on camera".

Man Alive began to push the boundaries further. In 1966, a programme called "Lift up Your Skirt", introduced by Malcolm Muggeridge, explored the Playboy club scene. In 1967, the series issued a two-part special report called "Consenting Adults" on the issue of male and female homosexuality, the opinion of society towards gay men and lesbians and possible decriminalisation of male homosexual acts along the lines of the Wolfenden report. In 1971, sex education was the subject for scrutiny in "Sex and Common sense" followed in 1975 by "X-ploitation" which looked at the seedy side of the film industry. The series was broadcast in an era when sex, class and religion were seen as controversial issues.

Many of the films can now be seen as invaluable snapshots of British life in a bygone age. In the early seventies, episodes ranged from "The Other Woman", which looked at mistresses, to "The Office Party", with all that comes with it. "The Alternative Press" looked at Oz, IT and small independent community newspapers that were appearing all over Britain to challenge the national newspaper groups with a more moral and intimate attempt at bringing relevant news to people. "Don't Call Us" looked at out-of-work actors, "The Possessed" was a look at suburban housewives involved with the occult and "Soho" was a leisurely trek around a fast-changing corner of Bohemian London. "The Fallen Idols" looked those who had been to the top and back, two of its subjects being Bill Maynard and Anthony Steel. One of the programmes, entitled "The Disc Jockeys", aired on 11 February 1970 and offered a glimpse into the work of Radio One disk jockeys Tony Blackburn, Jimmy Young, Kenny Everett, Emperor Rosko and John Peel.

"Twinkle Twinkle Little Star", filmed in July 1973 and broadcast on Wednesday, 24 October of that year, dealt with the British record industry's efforts to find a new pre-teen boy singing star to rival Americans such as Jimmy Osmond. Although it featured, among others, eleven-year-old Ricky Wilde (son of Marty Wilde), the programme primarily concerned itself with the ill-fated eleven-year-old Darren Burn, an ex-Christ Church Senior Chorister from Southgate in north London and the son of EMI executive Colin Burn. EMI spent a lot of money promoting him and although his initial record releases in 1973 were produced by Eric Woolfson, his record career failed to take off; his first single, "Something's Gotten Hold of My Heart", backed with "True Love Ways" (EMI 2040) reached number 60 in the charts. The programme contains an interview with Darren Burn by reporter John Pitman, in which Burn comes across as very intelligent and sophisticated for his age. In July 1988, during his last BBC Television interview ("People...Whatever Happened To Darren Burn?"), Burn, then aged 26, referring to his ill-fated launch in 1973, told John Pitman that it had been "a very strange thing for a young child to go through" and that it had left him "with a feeling of failure". He also appeared to be blaming his parents for allowing him go through the whole affair and told Pitman, "I certainly wouldn't allow one of my children to do that...should I ever have any". He died in October 1991, aged 30, in his flat in Southwark, south London, after taking an overdose of anti-depressants. Music critic Roy Carr, a contributor to "Twinkle Twinkle Little Star", said on the programme, "There are a lot of charlatans in this business who are out to make a quick buck and they don't care who they get it off!"

In October 1979, Man Alive covered the contraction of the Triumph motorcycles factory at Meriden with many original members of the workers' co-operative being made redundant. Their leaving enabled Triumph to survive a further 4 years although, as shown on the programme, there was much bitterness and regret surrounding their departure, particularly as many participated in the original sit-in that stopped the new owners, NVT, closing Meriden down.

One of Man Alive's most eloquent, if least known, films was "Alone", which was broadcast over Christmas 1970. Looking at loneliness through a range of candid interviewees, including a widower who was desperate not to burden anyone else but could find no solace in his life since the death of his wife, a man who had found himself gradually losing touch with his family, and a girl who dwelt at busy railway stations to feel a sense of company.

By 1975, there were fewer Man Alive programmes being made, 28 that year, followed by one in 1976, eight in 1978. The number of programmes commissioned did go back up to beyond 20 a year for the last three years; though the final documentary series in 1981 included a polemic on road accidents called "The biggest epidemic of our times" which was directed by Nick Ross and which went on to be transferred to BBC1 and repeated and updated for several years and turned out to have a major impact on government policy.

The film which perhaps best sums up the series' strengths is "Gale is Dead", the story of 19-year-old Gale Parsons, who died a drug addict on 11 February 1970, during the making of the film. She had been brought up in no less than 14 institutions and was convinced that she mattered to no one. Her story was told mainly through the eyes of Mrs. Nancy David, a teacher who became a key figure in her life.

== Beyond Man Alive ==
The Man Alive films were followed in 1982 by an attempt to create 'studio documentaries' called the Man Alive Debate, each of which tried to create a live documentary-style narrative with the story's cast of characters gathered at the BBC Television Centre in west London. Although it held its own for a while the strand was eventually replaced by 40 Minutes, which returned to the all-film format but without presenter or reporter, thus marking a turn towards the so-called fly-on-the-wall documentary. The replacement for Man Alive was edited by Edward Mirzoeff. (The Times 1989).

Wilcox set up the Man Alive Group, an independent production company formed with original Man Alive producer Michael Latham. Latham died in January 2006. Desmond Wilcox continued to make television programmes as an independent producer, in 1983 his film, "The Boy David" for the BBC's The Visit centred on David Lopez, abandoned as a baby in Peru, who had a disease eating away at his face. Desmond Wilcox died in September 2000.

== Notable Man Alive reporters ==
- Anna Ford
- Angela Huth
- Malcolm Muggeridge
- John Percival
- John Pitman
- Jonathan Power
- Jack Pizzey
- Nick Ross
- Desmond Wilcox
- Harold Williamson
- Jeanne La Chard
- Jim Douglas Henry
- Jeremy James
