= List of EastEnders characters introduced in 2016 =

EastEnders logo

EastEnders is a BBC soap opera that first aired on 19 February 1985. The following is a list of characters that first appeared in 2016, in order of first appearance. All characters are introduced by the show's executive producer Dominic Treadwell-Collins, or his successor Sean O'Connor.

In January, Kyle Slater's close friend Sophie Dodd (Poppy Rush) and Stacey Branning's (Lacey Turner) psychiatric nurse Dr. Delia Forde (Carolyn Pickles) were both introduced. Joel Reynolds' (Cavan Clerkin) brother Tim Reynolds (Charlie Baker), Jay Brown's (Jamie Borthwick) love interest Linzi Bragg (Amy-Leigh Hickman), Linzi's mother Thelma Bragg (Lorraine Stanley), Jordan Johnson's (Joivan Wade) son JJ Johnson (Zayden Kareem) and Claudette Hubbard's (Ellen Thomas) foster son Linford Short (Leon Lopez) all made their first appearances in February. March saw Linford's friend, Andy Flynn (Jack Derges), arrive. Kyle's mother, Alison Slater, played by Denise Welch, Shakil Kazemi (Shaheen Jafargholi), the son of Carmel Kazemi (Bonnie Langford) and brother of Kush Kazemi (Davood Ghadami), and Belinda Peacock's (Carli Norris) husband Neville (Gary Webster) all made their first appearances in May, while Paul Coker's (Jonny Labey) estranged mother Jenny Rawlinson (Amy Marston) arrived in July along with Simon Atmore (Tom Palmer), one of Paul's killers. August saw the arrival of Grant Mitchell (Ross Kemp) and Michelle Fowler's (Jenna Russell) son Mark Fowler (Ned Porteous). The rest of Paul's killers and Geraldine Clough (Gwyneth Strong) arrived in September, Lee Carter's (Danny Hatchard) friend, Moose (Sam Gittins) arrived in October and Lee's colleague Oz Bolat (Noah Maxwell-Clarke) arrived in November. However, Shakil and Andy were the only new regular characters to be introduced in 2016; both have since departed the serial. Additionally, multiple minor characters appeared throughout the year.

== Sophie Dodd ==
Sophie Dodd
- EastEnders character
- Portrayed by: Poppy Rush
- First appearance: Episode 5204; 4 January 2016
- Last appearance: Episode 5275; 2 May 2016
- Introduced by: Dominic Treadwell-Collins

Sophie Dodd, played by Poppy Rush, appears in seven episodes between 4 and 19 January 2016 and four episodes between 27 April and 2 May 2016.

Sophie is the best friend of Kyle Slater (Riley Carter Millington), and along with Ricksy Hicks (Joel Phillimore) and another friend, they arrive in Walford when Kyle decides to meet his half-sister Stacey Branning (Lacey Turner). While Kyle is meeting her, Sophie and Ricksy discuss their friendship with Kyle, and it is revealed that she has stood by him while during an event in his life (later revealed to be his transition from female to male). After Kyle meets Stacey, he tells Sophie that she is a bit weird, and Sophie says she is proud of him and asks if he has told her his secret; he says he does not want her to know. They go to The Queen Victoria pub, and Sophie and Ricksy wait there while Kyle visits Stacey again, and when they order food, it is too salty because it has been sabotaged by Babe Smith (Annette Badland). They leave later when Kyle says things with Stacey were complicated.

Eventually, Kyle moves in with Stacey and gets a job at Ian Beale's (Adam Woodyatt) restaurant. Sophie comes to Walford to support Kyle when the restaurant hosts the Pride of Walford Awards. She meets Tina Carter (Luisa Bradshaw-White) and they both end up waitressing at the restaurant. Through Kyle and Sophie's conversation, it is revealed that they used to date when Kyle was Sarah. Sophie encourages Tina to get drunk at the event, and when Tina humiliates her girlfriend Sonia Fowler (Natalie Cassidy), she confides in Sophie, who kisses Tina. She apologises but then Tina kisses her back. They then have sex and afterwards, Sophie says Tina is not really her type and she has feelings for someone else, so Tina encourages her to find that person again but Sophie says she has changed too much. They then exchange phone numbers. Sophie talks to Kyle, saying she was in love with Sarah, but Kyle just wants to be friends and he says he does not want to "go backwards", so she asks if she is part of his past that he wants to forget, and she leaves, though Kyle wants her in his life. Sophie then texts Tina but Tina ignores her, so Sophie goes to Tina's home and tells Sonia what has happened. This results in Sonia forcing them both to leave, and outside, Sophie insults Tina. She then speaks to Kyle again, saying he should go back to Blackpool with her, and she has been talking to his mother, Alison Slater (Denise Welch) and she would take him back. Kyle says Alison will only accept him as Sarah. Sophie says she loves and misses Sarah as she cared about other people but calls Kyle selfish and says he made the wrong choice to become a man. She then leaves.

Rush's performance was praised by her mother, Coronation Street actress Debbie Rush, on Twitter. While Laura-Jayne Tyler of Inside Soap observed, "Kyle's mate Soph is a fast mover isn't she? Not many Walford newbies manage to bag themselves a job and a one-night stand in the space of a single episode. Respect!"

== Delia Forde ==
Dr Delia Forde
- EastEnders character
- Portrayed by: Carolyn Pickles
- First appearance: Episode 5216; 22 January 2016
- Last appearance: Episode 5233; 22 February 2016
- Introduced by: Dominic Treadwell-Collins
In-universe information
- Occupation: Psychiatrist

Dr Delia Forde, played by Carolyn Pickles, appears in four episodes between 22 January and 22 February 2016.

Dr Forde is a psychiatrist who assesses Stacey Branning (Lacey Turner) when her boyfriend Martin Fowler (James Bye) convinces her to go to hospital. She and her colleague, Eve Igwe (Emmanuella Cole), inform Martin that there are no mother and baby unit places, and when Martin says that Stacey will not want to stay because of this, she explains that Stacey would likely be sectioned. After this is done, Dr Forde asks Stacey about her visions of God, and Stacey confirms that she started speaking to God only after the birth of her son Arthur Fowler, so Dr Forde concludes that Stacey is suffering from postpartum psychosis. Despite Stacey's pleas to see Arthur, Dr Forde sends Martin home to take care of him.

Dr Forde meets Martin again when he visits Stacey the next week. On the day that Stacey is due for a medical review, she tells Dr Forde about a nightmare she had, but Dr Forde says this is probably just down to anxiety. At the review, Dr Forde gives Stacey the option of continuing her treatment at home and staying in hospital voluntarily. Stacey decides to stay. Martin tries to break Stacey out of the hospital, so Dr Forde tries to stop this, and after he tells her that Stacey tried to harm herself, she insists he goes home. She then talks to Stacey about what happened, and convinces her that she is a good person despite the bad things that have happened in her life. Stacey is then transferred to another hospital.

In the character's final episode, she states that "there isn't the money to look after these women properly", referring to budget cuts to mental health services in the UK. Viewers praised this on Twitter, claiming that EastEnders had helped raise awareness of this issue.

== Tim Reynolds ==
Tim Reynolds
- EastEnders character
- Portrayed by: Charlie Baker
- First appearance: Episode 5222; 2 February 2016
- Last appearance: Episode 5277/5278; 4 May 2016
- Introduced by: Dominic Treadwell-Collins
In-universe information
- Brothers: Joel Reynolds
- Nieces: Danielle Jones; Hannah Reynolds; Annabelle Reynolds; Molly Reynolds

Timothy "Tim" Reynolds, played by comedian Charlie Baker, appears in five episodes between 2 February and 4 May 2016.

Tim is the brother of Joel Reynolds (Cavan Clerkin), who has been killed in a speedboat accident along with his wife Stephanie Reynolds (Claire Lubert). Tim meets Joel's former girlfriend Ronnie Mitchell (Samantha Womack) in The Queen Victoria, after Joel's daughter Hannah Reynolds (Mia Jenkins) returns flowers that Ronnie left on Joel and Stephanie's grave, accusing Ronnie of causing their deaths, following the affair she had with Joel several years earlier. Ronnie hands Tim a cheque for £5,000 to help look after Hannah and her sisters, Molly Reynolds and Annabelle Reynolds, but Hannah tears it up, calling it "blood money". Tim thanks Ronnie for the gesture before leaving.

Tim later returns, saying he has something for Ronnie from Joel and her daughter Danielle Jones (Lauren Crace), who also died several years previously. He shows her some photos and a locket belonging to Danielle, upsetting Ronnie. He apologises, and when she says he needs to grieve his brother, he says she is the only person who understands and tries to kiss her, but she pulls away. Tim returns to Ronnie's house when Hannah goes missing before she is due in court, but Ronnie has not seen her. Hannah is found and thanks to Ronnie attending court, the case is dropped. Tim asks Hannah to apologise to Ronnie but she insists she has not sent Ronnie the death threats she received.

Baker said of his role: "It is an honour to join the hugely talented cast and production team of Britain's favourite soap" and added that he was "thrilled" to follow in the footsteps of other comedians who had appeared in EastEnders, including Mike Reid (Frank Butcher), Ricky Grover (Andrew Cotton), Josie Lawrence (Manda Best), Terry Alderton (Terry Spraggan) and Richard Blackwood (Vincent Hubbard). Following his first appearance, Baker confirmed on his Twitter account that Tim would make further appearances over the next few months. Digital Spy said, "there is something a little unnerving about [Tim]", called him "Tim Nice-But-Dim", said his interest in Ronnie is "weird", adding that Ronnie should not trust him.

== Thelma Bragg ==
Thelma Bragg
- EastEnders character
- Portrayed by: Lorraine Stanley
- First appearance: Episode 5225; 8 February 2016
- Last appearance: Episode 5271/5272; 27 April 2016
- Introduced by: Dominic Treadwell-Collins
In-universe information
- Occupation: Pub landlady
- Sons: Rodney Bragg
- Daughters: Linzi Bragg

Thelma Bragg, played by Lorraine Stanley, appears in eight episodes between 8 February and 27 April 2016.

Thelma is a pub landlady who comes to The Queen Victoria when they host an event for "East London Lady Publicans". Thelma is already drunk, and flirts with Kush Kazemi (Davood Ghadami). She offers Nancy Carter (Maddy Hill) a job as assistant manager at her pub, the Rat and Ferret, and then leaves with her daughter, Linzi Bragg (Amy-Leigh Hickman). After Nancy has a trial at Thelma's pub, Whitney Dean (Shona McGarty) contacts Thelma and gets her boyfriend and Nancy's brother Lee Carter (Danny-Boy Hatchard) a trial as well. Thelma is impressed by his good looks and agrees to offer him the job. Thelma later collects Linzi from school after Linzi gets into a fight with Louise Mitchell (Tilly Keeper) and is angry with her.

Linzi's friend Bex Fowler (Jasmine Armfield) tells Thelma that Linzi is in a relationship with an older man, so Thelma goes to The Queen Victoria, demanding to know who it is, as Linzi is 14. Bex says it is Jay Brown (Jamie Borthwick). Thelma confronts Jay as Linzi runs out, and everyone tells Thelma to go after her. Linzi accuses Thelma of being jealous, saying Jay has done nothing wrong, but Thelma calls the police and Jay is arrested. Thelma attends court when Jay pleads guilty and is sentenced to 150 hours of unpaid work and must sign the Sex Offender Register for five years. Afterwards, Thelma collects Linzi and tells Sonia Fowler (Natalie Cassidy) and Tina Carter (Luisa Bradshaw-White) what happened in court.

Ofcom received complaints after the scene where Thelma refers to Jay as a "ginger nonce". A viewer objected to Thelma's choice of words stating that it was a "discriminatory reference to hair colour."

The actress Lorraine Stanley had previously portrayed a young Mo Harris (Laila Morse) in the flashback special Pat and Mo (2004), and went on to play Karen Taylor a year later, in a regular role.

== Linzi Bragg ==
Linzi Bragg
- EastEnders character
- Portrayed by: Amy-Leigh Hickman
- Duration: 2016–2017
- First appearance: Episode 5225; 8 February 2016
- Last appearance: Episode 5462; 21 March 2017
- Introduced by: Dominic Treadwell-Collins (2016); Sean O'Connor (2017)
In-universe information
- Other names: Star Bragg
- Occupation: Student
- Mother: Thelma Bragg
- Brothers: Rodney Bragg

Star "Linzi" Bragg, played by Amy-Leigh Hickman, appears in 16 episodes between 8 February and 27 April 2016, and again from 17 March 2017 to 21 March 2017. The character is credited as Linzi in 2016 and Star in 2017.

Jay Brown (Jamie Borthwick) bumps into Linzi outside The Queen Victoria pub, and then follows her into the café. She tells him she is waiting to take someone home, and he buys her a milkshake. They exchange numbers before Linzi leaves with her mother, Thelma Bragg (Lorraine Stanley). A few days later, Jay and Linzi meet for a date, but Jay is unable to get them a table at a restaurant, so he decorates the garage where he works and they have a date there. They share a kiss but when she leaves abruptly, he assumes she does not want a second date. He is frustrated when she does not reply to his text messages. However, she later visits him at home where they are found kissing by Ben Mitchell (Harry Reid) and his girlfriend Abi Branning (Lorna Fitzgerald). Linzi suggests they all go on holiday to Ibiza in the summer. Linzi and Jay go to the car lot to be alone and Jay leaves Linzi alone whilst he goes out to get condoms. A drunken Phil Mitchell (Steve McFadden) destroys the car lot with a digger and Jay fears Linzi is trapped, but is relieved to discover she was not inside when it happened. Jay tells Linzi that Louise Mitchell (Tilly Keeper) tried to kiss him so Linzi warns Louise to stay away from Jay.

Jay and Linzi plan a night in a hotel, and Linzi sends Jay a sexually explicit video and photos. When Jay collects Louise from school after she is in a fight, he is shocked that Louise was fighting with Linzi and she is a schoolgirl. Louise and Bex Fowler (Jasmine Armfield) tell Jay that Linzi's real name is Star and she is 14. Jay later meets Star, and she begs him not to end their relationship, as he is the only person who has ever treated her well; even her mother was too drunk when she was born to give her a proper name and she was named by the punters at her pub. He tells her to forget everything that has happened and she says she understands but is upset. However, when Louise catches them talking, she insults Star and Jay tells her to leave him alone. Star seeks comfort from Bex, who tells Thelma about the relationship, and Thelma goes to The Queen Victoria demanding to know who has had sex with her underage daughter, and Bex says it was Jay. Star leaves in tears and later runs away from Thelma. Jay is arrested when Thelma calls the police.

Jay is interviewed by the police and the photos and video that Star sent him are found on his phone, though he had deleted them when he discovered her age. He pleads guilty, knowing that he has no defence against the photos being there and because he does not want to put Star through the ordeal of giving evidence in court and the photos being shown. Due to mitigating factors, Jay is given a non-custodial sentence of 150 hours of unpaid work and must sign the Sex Offender Register for five years. Star's brothers brutally attack Jay and he is shunned by some of his family and the wider community because he pleaded guilty; he is branded a paedophile. Louise angrily confronts Star over causing Jay's ordeal. Sonia Fowler (Natalie Cassidy) takes Star to her house and looks after her whilst Jay's court appearance takes place. Sonia reassures Star who feels guilty over Jay's situation. Thelma comes to collect her afterwards and takes her home.

Following an incident when an explicit photo of Shakil Kazemi (Shaheen Jafargoli) results in Bex being bullied by Madison Drake (Seraphina Beh) and Alexandra D'Costa (Sydney Craven), Star offers support to Bex. Bex and Star go to Ben's 21st birthday party but Jay insists she leaves. Star tells Jay that she still has feelings for him and went to the party so she could see him again, and tells Jay that Madison, who Jay has been talking to at the party, is 15 and he therefore knew what he was doing with Star and is now doing it again.

Of her casting, Hickman said, "Never in a million years did I think something like this would happen to me, it has literally changed my life. The hardest thing was keeping the secret. When I found out that I had the part I just wanted to shout it out and tell everyone, but it was made even harder because I was in Swansea performing in Jermin Productions' pantomime and I couldn't even tell my cast mates. It was extremely hard trying to explain to my friends why I was back and fore to London every week. I had to tell them I was auditioning for a different project. But I knew they would understand when they found out the real reason. Everyone was really happy for me, it's such a huge opportunity. I am loving every second of it, it's such an eye opener and learning curve." On 2 February 2016, it was revealed that Linzi would be a love interest for Jay Brown (Jamie Borthwick), with a show source saying, "As soon as they see each other, there's clearly a spark between them. They get on really well." It was speculated that Linzi would be linked to a storyline that had been previously announced for Jay, that was billed as one of the biggest storylines of 2016. The Metro said in April 2016 that "Jay and Linzi have cemented themselves as Walford's latest answer to Posh and Becks" but noticed that viewers had been speculating "that Linzi isn't as sweet and innocent as she seems."

== JJ Johnson ==
JJ Johnson
- EastEnders character
- Portrayed by: Zayden Kareem
- First appearance: Episode 5227; 11 February 2016
- Last appearance: Episode 5257; 4 April 2016
- Introduced by: Dominic Treadwell-Collins
In-universe information
- Father: Jordan Johnson
- Mother: Amelle Ellington
- Grandfathers: Lucas Johnson
- Grandmothers: Trina Johnson
- Aunts: Chelsea Fox
- First cousins: Jordan Fox

Jamie "JJ" Johnson, played by Zayden Kareem, appears in 14 episodes between 11 February and 4 April 2016. He is the son of Jordan Johnson (Joivan Wade) and Amelle Ellington (Sophia Brown). Jordan's stepmother, Denise Fox (Diane Parish), tracks Jordan down at the squat he is living in following a visit from the police, and Jordan says that Amelle is dead from a drug overdose. Denise brings Jordan and JJ to Albert Square. Denise's surrogate father Patrick Trueman (Rudolph Walker) struggles to bond with JJ, and Claudette Hubbard (Ellen Thomas) realises that Patrick is deliberately distancing himself from JJ because Patrick dislikes Jordan. Claudette convinces Patrick that JJ and Jordan are his family, so Patrick enjoys his time with JJ, and eventually, they are able to stay.

When Jordan is arrested by the police over Lucas Johnson's (Don Gilet) plan to escape from prison, Patrick questions JJ's future and Denise insists she will take care of him. Denise is horrified with and against Patrick's suggestion of giving JJ up to social services, but Patrick calls them without Denise's knowledge. Denise is told by social worker Hilary Taylor (Sadie Shimmin) that JJ's mother, Amelle, is alive. Amelle visits Denise and JJ, but he refuses to come out from under the table. Denise learns JJ is called Jamie and she talks to him, he says Jordan told him that Amelle left because she found him "hard work" and he is only hiding because he is scared of putting Amelle off him. Denise persuades him to see his mother, and when Hilary talks about increased contact, Denise decides JJ should live with Amelle.

Speaking of Kareem on This Morning, Parish said, "He's absolutely fantastic. It's quite hard to keep that concealed. Zayden's four, he's great. He gets right into it—he sort of has a little muck around and he says 'right, we're going to do it now' and he gets into the zone." Wade said of Jordan's relationship with JJ: "Jordan hasn't been able to be the kind of dad he wants to be, but at the same time he doesn't want to give JJ the same relationship Jordan has had with [his own father] Lucas. The heart is there and he's trying to do the very best he can with what he's got."

== Linford Short ==
Linford Short
- EastEnders character
- Portrayed by: Leon Lopez
- First appearance: Episode 5234; 23 February 2016
- Last appearance: Episode 5279; 5 May 2016
- Introduced by: Dominic Treadwell-Collins
In-universe information
- Occupation: Builder
- Adoptive mother: Claudette Hubbard (foster)
- Brothers: Vincent Hubbard (foster); Glen (foster)
- Sisters: Donna Yates (foster)

Linford Short, played by Leon Lopez, is a foster son of Claudette Hubbard (Ellen Thomas). The character is first mentioned in the show in the episode broadcast on 11 December 2015, and Lopez's casting in the role was announced on 14 January 2016, when it was said that he would appear in "a handful of scenes" that Lopez had already started filming. His first on-screen appearance is in the episode broadcast on 23 February 2016. He appears in seven episodes in total, with 5 May 2016 being his last. On joining EastEnders, Lopez said, "I'm so excited to be working on EastEnders and still can't believe it! It really is a dream come true." A show source said, "Leon is only in a few episodes of EastEnders and it's quite a small part, but everyone is really excited to have him on set."

Linford arrives in Walford, telling Claudette he is there for the first birthday party of his foster brother Vincent Hubbard's (Richard Blackwood) daughter Pearl Fox-Hubbard (Arayah), but then reveals that he and Vincent have entered Claudette into the Pride of Walford Awards for her fostering, and she is a finalist. He later returns to concrete Vincent's basement, unaware that Vincent has buried Claudette under the ground, believing her to be dead. When Linford tells Vincent that the ground was uneven and there was mud on the stairs when he laid the concrete, Vincent realises that Claudette escaped. Linford and Andy later park a digger in the Square during their renovation work, and when a drunken Phil Mitchell (Steve McFadden) gets into it, they try to stop him but Phil destroys the car lot with it. Linford then helps rescue Phil's daughter Louise Mitchell (Tilly Keeper) from the wreckage and, with the help of Andy and another man, drags Phil from the digger. Jack Branning (Scott Maslen) later hires Linford as a builder to help him convert a house he has bought into flats and he and Linford look over the property for him.

The following week, Jack draws up a contract for Linford and Andy and invites them to a karaoke night at the Queen Victoria Pub. Whilst Linford and Andy talk in the café, Linford reveals that he is attracted to Jack's partner, Ronnie Mitchell (Samantha Womack), and Andy teases him about it with Jack nearly overhearing. This is Linford's last appearance. Four months later, Claudette goes to stay with Linford to cope with her problems in Walford.

== Andy Flynn ==
Andy Flynn
- EastEnders character
- Portrayed by: Jack Derges
- First appearance: Episode 5247; 17 March 2016
- Last appearance: Episode 5329; 8 August 2016
- Introduced by: Dominic Treadwell-Collins
In-universe information
- Other names: Gareth Jones
- Occupation: Builder
- Father: Andy Jones
- Mother: Lizzie Jones
- Sisters: Danielle Jones (adoptive)

Andy Flynn (also Gareth Jones), played by Jack Derges, appears in 35 episodes from 17 March to 8 August 2016.

Andy is introduced as a friend of Linford Short (Leon Lopez) who helps him with work on his foster brother Vincent Hubbard's (Richard Blackwood) basement. Vincent's wife Kim Fox-Hubbard (Tameka Empson) flirts with him. Andy and Linford later park a digger in the Square during their renovation work, and when a drunken Phil Mitchell (Steve McFadden) gets into it, Andy tries to stop him but Phil destroys the car lot with it. Andy then helps rescue Phil's daughter Louise Mitchell (Tilly Keeper) from the wreckage and, with the help of Linford and another man, drags Phil from the digger. Jack Branning (Scott Maslen) later hires Andy as a builder to help him convert a house he has bought into flats and he and Linford look over the property for him. Andy also saves Hannah Reynolds (Mia Jenkins) from being hit by a car whilst she is holding Ronnie Mitchell's (Samantha Womack) son Matthew Mitchell-Cotton in her arms.

The following week, Jack draws up a contract for Andy and Linford and invites them to a karaoke night at the Queen Victoria Pub. However, Andy does not arrive and Jack tells Ronnie he is dogsitting. When Martin Fowler (James Bye) asks Andy how much the flats will sell for, Andy says he would not be able to afford them. Jack tells Andy that Martin and his fiancée Stacey Branning (Lacey Turner) are having money problems, so Andy helps Martin find work away from Walford. The next day, Andy invites himself into Stacey's home; her half-brother Kyle Slater (Riley Carter Millington) wonders about his intentions, though Stacey seems not to mind.

Stacey soon realises that Andy is homeless when she sees him heading into the flats late at night. When Andy wolf-whistles at Stacey, Kyle is upset and later confronts Andy, saying it is the kind of behaviour that leads to rape. Kyle threatens violence against Andy, shaking the ladder he is on, but Stacey stops him. Later, in the pub, Andy and Jack call Kyle a feminist, so Kyle assumes Stacey has told them that he is transgender and angrily leaves. Andy realises that Kyle is transgender and tells Stacey he has no problem with it, and Stacey reveals she knows Andy is homeless, offering him the use of her shower. Martin sees Andy wearing only a towel in the flat when he speaks to Stacey on video chat, and when he returns, he tells Andy to shower elsewhere, but Andy says he knows that Martin was fired from his job and is lying to Stacey. Andy tells Stacey this, saying he assumed Martin would have told her. He babysits for Ronnie when her mother Glenda Mitchell (Glynis Barber) arrives. Andy listens in on Glenda's telephone conversation with her son Danny Mitchell (Liam Bergin), and later reveals this conversation to Ronnie. Martin later asks Andy if he can do more building work, but Andy says he is not qualified, but says that Jack has had 40 toilets delivered in error and they can sell them on and split the profits. With the help of Kyle and Stacey, they are able to steal the toilets. However, they struggle to sell them and hear the police are investigating. Later, Andy looks at newspaper articles he has collected about Ronnie. Andy manages to get the keys to Ronnie's house where he looks on Ronnie's laptop; when she quizzes him about it he explains he is looking at care homes for his father.

When Stacey's cousin Belinda Peacock (Carli Norris) inadvertently tries to sell the stolen toilets back to Jack, Martin, Stacey, Kyle and Belinda return them to the flats, breaking in as they do so. Jack then installs CCTV, meaning Andy can no longer squat there. Stacey allows him to stay in their flat for a few days. Andy finds Kyle looking at his file of newspaper articles, including a photo of Andy and Ronnie's dead daughter, Danielle Jones (Lauren Crace), together. When Kyle asks who she is, Andy says she is his sister.

Andy flirts with Roxy Mitchell (Rita Simons) when he first meets her, and he asked her on a date but she punches him when he goes to kiss her; she admits to feeling imprisoned by her former boyfriend Dean Wicks's (Matt Di Angelo) attempted rape, so he tells her she is free of him as he is in prison, and they kiss. Ronnie encourages Roxy to date Andy and she agrees. As she texts Andy, he is with his father, Andy Jones (Aneirin Hughes), also Danielle's adoptive father, and tells him he is getting closer to Ronnie.

Due to overcrowding at Stacey's flat, Andy decides to squat in Jack's new flats but Jack and Ronnie catch him using the shower. They let him move in with them, but after Ronnie sends Andy's things to the launderette, Dot Branning (June Brown) calls her having found a news cutting about Danielle in Andy's pocket. Ronnie realises it is Andy's so confronts him, but he claims he wanted to find out the truth about Ronnie after hearing gossip and felt a connection as his mother and sister also died; Ronnie asks Andy to move back out but he unplugs the phone and turns sinister, only to be interrupted by Jay Brown (Jamie Borthwick) saying that Roxy's daughter Amy Mitchell (Abbie Knowles) is missing. Andy finds her, and apologises to Ronnie, saying he just wanted time to explain, and she allows him to stay. After finding a train ticket intending for Telford, which is where Danielle was from, Ronnie realises who Andy is. She confronts him about his true identity and being her stalker, and he angrily accuses her of causing Danielle's death. She explains that she was unaware of Danielle's true identity until shortly before her death; they talk about her fondly. Jack, who has been told Andy's true identity, finds them both and punches Andy. Roxy confronts Andy as she believes he had used her to get to Ronnie. Although he explains that he was genuinely interested in Roxy, she coldly tells him to leave, only for Ronnie to go after him as she believes he is still struggling to grieve for Danielle's death.

Ronnie and Andy have a heart-to-heart about Danielle, only for Andy to try to kiss Ronnie. He instantly regrets this and says he has messed things up and that he caused Danielle's death because he encouraged her to find her birth mother. Ronnie tells him to stop blaming himself as he has been doing. Andy suggests that he and Ronnie start making up for their lost years, but she tells him to leave and that they both need to move on from Danielle's death. Ronnie assures Andy she is always there for him and gives him Danielle's locket. Stacey sees Andy leaving and asks him why he did not tell her the truth. He says he was afraid that she would tell Ronnie and then thanks her for being a friend to him and Danielle, before leaving the Square.

=== Development and reception ===
The Metro called him "the 'fit' builder pal of Linford", saying that they initially thought he was "background filler" but since he had been given more lines and befriended Ronnie, they speculated that he could be Ronnie's stalker. Andy is revealed to be the stalker in the 6 May 2016 episode. Reasons were then speculated as to why Andy would stalk Ronnie, including that he is the secret son of Kat Moon (Jessie Wallace), has connections to Carl White (Daniel Coonan), Charlie Cotton (Declan Bennett) or Fatboy (Ricky Norwood), or that he is connected to Ronnie's daughter Danielle Jones (Lauren Crace).

Andy confirms himself to be Danielle's brother in the 23 May 2016 episode, and he is shown to be the son of Danielle's adoptive father Andy Jones (Aneirin Hughes) in the 6 June 2016 episode. Following this, it was speculated if Andy was in fact the same person as Gareth Jones, the previously known brother of Danielle, and it was said that Andy would "get more sinister" and there would be twists to the storyline. Sophie Dainty from Digital Spy called Andy "Enigmatic, intriguing and really quite creepy" and said viewers were "gripped with his mysterious intentions". She opined that she was enjoying his storyline but did not want Ronnie to come to harm or Roxy to be heartbroken, so hoped "Andy's game is rumbled sooner rather than later".

Andy's final appearance in EastEnders is on 8 August 2016 at the conclusion of the storyline he was created for.

== Alison Slater ==
Alison Slater
- EastEnders character
- Portrayed by: Denise Welch
- Appears in: Episode 5276; 3 May 2016
- Introduced by: Dominic Treadwell-Collins
In-universe information
- Occupation: B&B owner
- Family: Slater
- Husband: Brian Slater (backstory)
- Sons: Kyle Slater
- Daughters: Shannon Slater; Siobhan Slater

Alison Slater, played by Denise Welch, is the mother of transgender character Kyle Slater (Riley Carter Millington). She appeared in episode 5276, first broadcast on 3 May 2016.

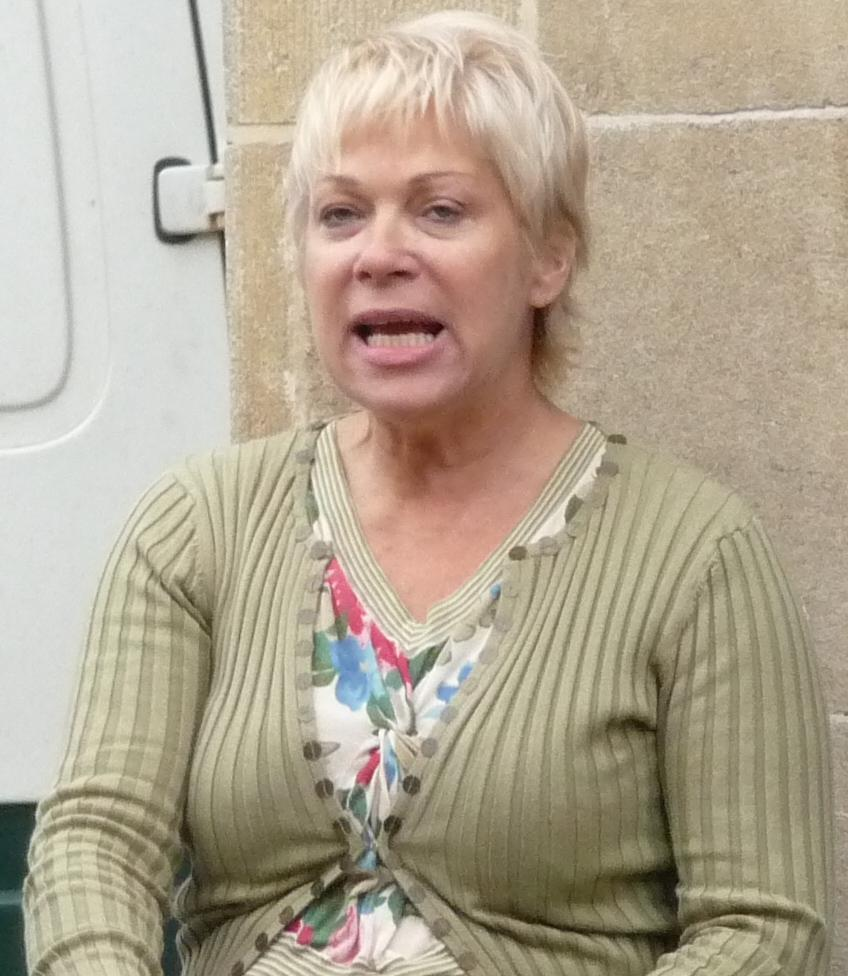
Actress Denise Welch dyed her hair for the role of Alison Slater.

Alison arrives at the flat where Kyle lives with his half-sister Stacey Branning (Lacey Turner). Kyle is out and the meeting is awkward because Stacey's father Brian was in a bigamous marriage with Alison until his death. Alison insists she thought Brian was single when she met him and found out only four months after he died. Stacey and Alison agree to be civil for Kyle's sake, but when Stacey says Kyle has missed his mother, she says she came to see her daughter, Sarah. Kyle arrives with flowers for Alison, and she says he looks nothing like Sarah. She struggles with the meeting, insisting that she has only daughters and Sarah was beautiful. Kyle says he did not feel beautiful; he felt wrong but now he does not. Alison says something is wrong with Kyle; he says he was born in the wrong body. Alison refuses to accept it; she had only just come to terms with Sarah being a lesbian when he announced he was transgender. Alison says it is not normal, and Stacey fails to convince her to get to know Kyle, telling her not to take Brian's actions out on Kyle. Alison says she is unable to build a relationship with Kyle, though wishes she could. She wishes him a happy life, but says he is not Sarah. She takes Kyle's flowers, says she is glad he is not on his own, and leaves. Outside, she cries.

Welch's casting was announced on 24 March 2016. She said of her role: "I'm thrilled to be part of such an iconic show. I have friends in the cast and can't wait to start. It's a short stint but such a powerful role and I'm thrilled to be taking it on." Speaking of Alison's reunion with her estranged son, Welch said, "I think he's hopeful Alison will return and open her arms to Kyle but it's just not as simple as that. I don't think Alison really knows what to expect. She knows what's happened and the choices Kyle has made, but when Alison last saw him, he was Sarah. I think she's very nervous about seeing him. This is a big deal for both of them." Although only appearing in one episode, Welsh said she would "never say never" to appearing again, and as long as Kyle is in the series, there will be an opportunity for Alison to be. Welch dyed her hair for the role, which was her own choice instead of a wig, because "it's a little bit of a different thing".

== Shakil Kazemi ==
Shakil Kazemi
- EastEnders character
- Portrayed by: Shaheen Jafargholi
- Duration: 2016–2018
- First appearance: Episode 5277/5278; 4 May 2016
- Last appearance: Episode 5713; 25 May 2018
- Introduced by: Dominic Treadwell-Collins
In-universe information
- Occupation: Student
- Father: Umar Kazemi
- Mother: Carmel Kazemi
- Brothers: Kush Kazemi; Darius Kazemi
- Nephews: Arthur Fowler; Zaair Kazemi

Shakil Kazemi, played by Shaheen Jafargholi, is the son of Carmel Kazemi (Bonnie Langford) and youngest brother of Kush Kazemi (Davood Ghadami). A regular character, he made his first appearance in the episode broadcast on 4 May 2016. It was announced in April 2018 that Jafargholi would be departing the soap, with his character killed off in a teen gang culture stabbing storyline, which began on 21 May 2018. Shakil's final scenes aired on 25 May 2018.

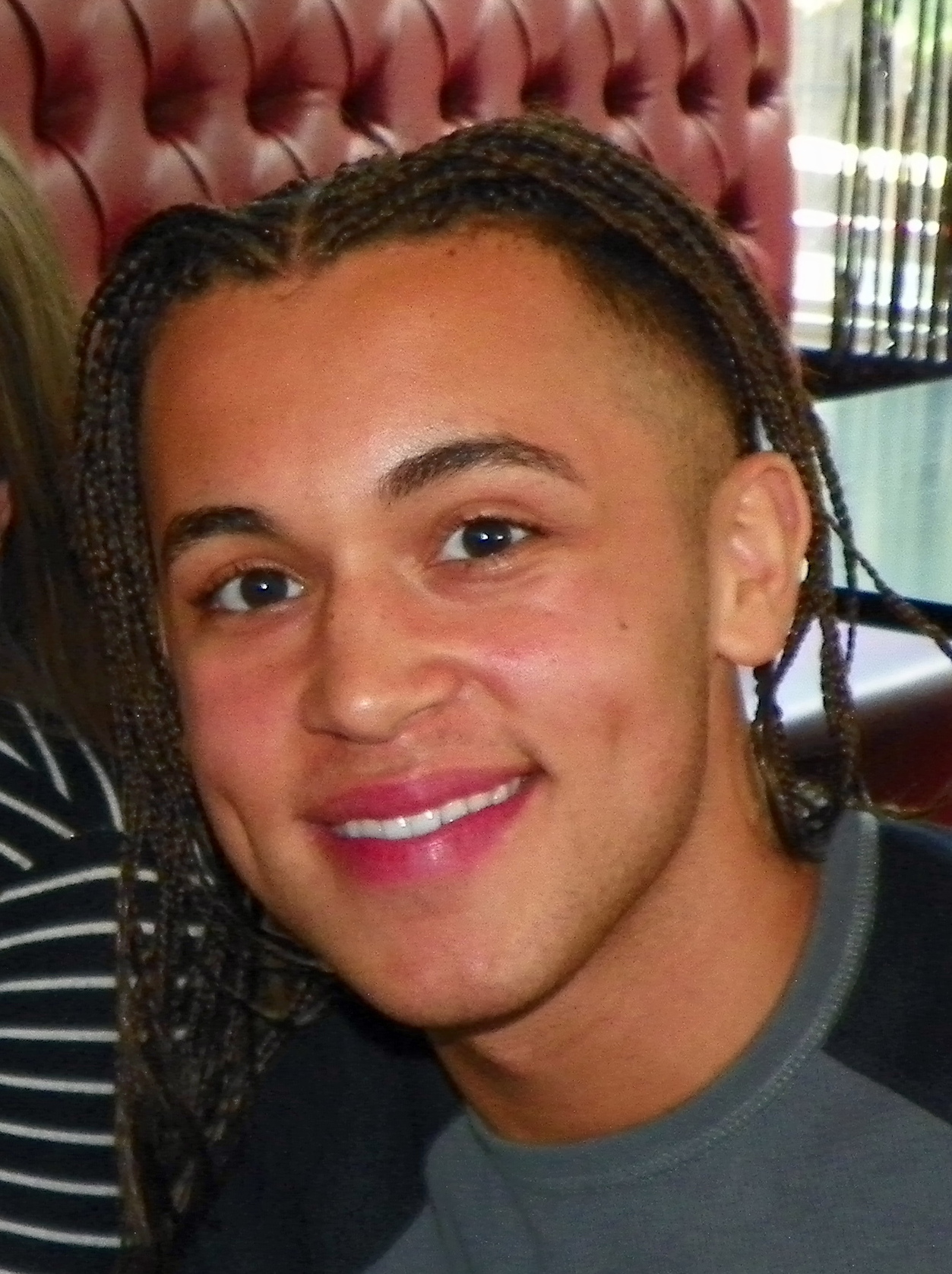
Shaheen Jafargholi portrayed Shakil Kazemi from 2016 to 2018.

Shakil arrives in Walford to tell Carmel that her former husband, Umar Kazemi (Selva Rasalingam), wants to meet her. However, he does not arrive and Kush realises that Shakil is lying, so he admits to Carmel that he made it up to try to reunite his parents. Carmel shouts at him to leave, but Shakil reveals he is no longer welcome at home so Carmel allows him to stay, saying he should enrol in Walford High School. He is against this until he sees his potential schoolmates, Louise Mitchell (Tilly Keeper) and Bex Fowler (Jasmine Armfield). Bex is annoyed when Louise flirts with Shakil, and at Martin (James Bye) and Stacey Fowler's (Lacey Turner) wedding reception, Shakil kisses Bex, witnessed by a jealous Louise. Louise tells Bex she does not mind that she kissed Shakil, but then tells Shakil that Bex has anger problems. When Shakil kisses Bex on the cheek, Louise convinces her to "treat him mean, keep him keen", so he is confused when Bex declines his offer of a drink. Shakil thinks Bex is no longer interested so she cancels lunch with Martin to see him; when Martin finds them together, Bex is happy when Shakil calls her his girlfriend.

Shakil is eventually invited to have lunch with Bex, Martin, and Sonia Fowler (Natalie Cassidy), but tension rises between him and Martin during a game of charades where Shakil insults Martin and makes a sexual comment about his wife Stacey. While Sonia remains frustrated at Martin's hostile behaviour, she also disciplines Shakil for his rudeness, and the two eventually make up. Shakil later tells Bex that he wants to lose his virginity with her before his 16th birthday, which worries Bex and she admits she is not ready to have sex. Shakil and Bex finally have sex in December, but Shakil ends his relationship with Bex shortly after because their communication breaks down and he assumes she is no longer interested, leaving her devastated. In January 2017, Shakil is travelling on a bus with Denise Fox (Diane Parish), Bex, Louise and new friend Keegan Baker (Zack Morris) back to Walford. The bus driver suffers a heart attack and crashes into the market and viaduct leaving many of the residents in danger. Shakil helps Bex and Louise out of the bus and Louise tells Bex that Shakil has saved her life. Shakil and Bex make amends but decide to stay as friends. When Madison Drake (Seraphina Beh) and Alexandra D'Costa (Sydney Craven) bully Bex during the showcase, Shakil exposes it through the soundboard. Shakil's feelings for Bex resurface but he finds out that she has feelings for their school teacher Gethin Pryce (Cerith Flinn). As a result, Gethin resigns from his job and Louise tells Shakil everything. Bex ignores them out of embarrassment and humiliation. Shakil is further disappointed when Louise tells him that he is immature but this leads them to kiss. Bex catches them and Louise reassures her that she and Shakil have no feelings for each other. Shakil disapproves of Carmel's relationship with Max Branning (Jake Wood), so chooses to stay with his father temporarily.

Shakil is told by a teacher that he has been invited to a music summer school because of his talent for creating electronic music, and though he initially refuses to attend, he later agrees to apply. He and Bex grow closer again and attempt to re start their relationship again. However, Shakil discovers Keegan has stolen a gang member's bicycle and insists he return it, showing Keegan images of him on social media with the bicycle, and telling him that the gang are looking for him. When Keegan is in the toilets, Shakil tries to secretly return the bicycle. Keegan realises he has gone and sees the gang, one of whom stabs him in the neck in an alleyway, Shakil emerges, and has been stabbed in the back. Shakil tries to find help whilst wounded, but eventually collapses into a bush in the Albert Square gardens whilst Keegan is rushed to hospital by Mick Carter (Danny Dyer). Shakil is later found and also taken to hospital in critical condition. Despite efforts to rescue him, he is later pronounced dead after hospital staff are unable to resuscitate him, devastating Kush and Carmel.

It was reported that Shakil arrives in Walford to try and reunite his divorced parents, but soon finds a romance of his own. Of his casting, Jafargholi said, "I'm so excited to be joining the show. I've been a fan since I was a little kid so to now be a part of something so iconic is an honour. I'm also really excited to be working with a legend such as Bonnie Langford. I'm having so much fun playing her son and can't wait for people to finally meet Shaki."

In March 2018, it was announced that Keegan and Shakil would be involved in a "hard hitting" knife crime storyline that "will place the Kazemis and Taylors at the heart of the show" following Keegan and Shakil being attacked in "tragic scenes" that sees their lives turned "upside down." The storyline will explore the "wide-reaching ramifications of knife crime for those for all those involved." For the storyline, the show is working alongside the Ben Kinsella Trust, which was founded by former EastEnders actress Brooke Kinsella, who played Kelly Taylor from 2001 to 2004, after her brother was stabbed to death. Kinsella said that she "commend[s]" EastEnders for choosing to "portray the realities of knife crime" and with it still rising, "people [need to] understand its lasting impact" as "It simply destroys lives forever." Executive consultant John Yorke added that "the brutal reality" of knife crime was "brought home" to everyone at EastEnders through the murder of Kinsella's brother. He described knife crime still as "prevalent today" and the show has "a long tradition of tackling serious public issues" and described the knife crime storyline as "the most important the show has ever embarked on", calling the episodes "powerful, heart-breaking and dramatic" as well as hoping the make "it clear that knife crime destroys the lives of everyone it touches." Shakil's death was nominated for "Most Devastating Soap Death" at the 2018 Digital Spy Reader Awards; it came in third place with 17.1% of the total votes. Real-life families of knife crime victims played mourners at Shakil's funeral in the episode aired on 6 July 2018.

== Neville Peacock ==
Neville Peacock
- EastEnders character
- Portrayed by: Gary Webster
- First appearance: Episode 5281; 9 May 2016
- Last appearance: Episode 5301; 14 June 2016
- Introduced by: Dominic Treadwell-Collins
In-universe information
- Occupation: Estate agent Salesman
- Wife: Belinda Slater (until 2016)

Neville Peacock is played by Gary Webster and appears in three episodes from 9 to 12 May 2016 and another on 14 June 2016.

Neville is first seen when he arrives home with his wife Belinda Peacock (Carli Norris) one night. Belinda sees Mick Carter (Danny Dyer) in their garden with his son Johnny Carter (Ted Reilly). They are returning Neville and Belinda's koi carp that Mick's father Buster Briggs (Karl Howman) had stolen. The next day, Belinda invites Mick and his wife Linda Carter (Kellie Bright) back to their house for dinner. Mick and Linda arrive as Belinda and Neville are arguing. Neville reveals to Mick that Belinda has a crush on him and invites him into the hot tub. After joining Neville in the hot tub, Mick feels uncomfortable when Neville reveals he is naked and suggests they wife swap. Mick declines but Neville threatens Mick with CCTV footage of him and Johnny.

Mick goes back to the house and tells Linda. They tell Neville and Belinda, both in the hot tub, that they need to leave, so Neville repeats his threat. Linda calls Neville "sick", saying he wants control over women and his relationship lacks real intimacy. Mick and Linda leave, but Belinda gets into their car and says she wants to leave Neville. They return to Mick and Linda's home in The Queen Victoria public house, where Neville arrives. Belinda tells him she is leaving him so he blames Linda for putting ideas in Belinda's head. He offers to take her on holiday but she says he never makes her feel beautiful, they never speak and she has to start arguments to get his attention, so she does not feel loved. Mick and Linda tell Neville to leave, so Neville insults Belinda's looks, but says he took his wedding vows seriously so she should come home. Mick punches Neville and ejects him from the room.

When Belinda receives a letter saying Neville has filed for divorce, she meets him with Mick in the café. She asks him for half the value of their house, but he says they should take out of the marriage what they put in and he is the one who paid the mortgage. He also says he has nothing to give her as he still has mortgage debt to pay. Mick says this is probably a lie and Neville probably has a dodgy accountant covering up his true worth. Mick says he would tell a court about Neville's penchant for swinging and his clients would find out, so Neville agrees to giving Belinda £50,000 or going to court. She agrees and when Neville leaves, she tells Mick she can get more.

Neville is described as "successful, middle-class businessman". The BBC said of the character, "Neville has always seen himself and his wife as a cut above the rest of the Slater clan believing them to be a picture of respectability. But what really goes on behind closed doors in this couple's prim and suburban relationship? Belinda is a Slater after all, so it can't all be white picket fences..." Webster, who previously played Graham Clark in EastEnders from 1987 to 1988, said of his role: "Filming these scenes was a lot of fun and it was great to work with Carli, and some other Walford residents who I can't reveal just yet! But I will say viewers won't want to miss it." Webster was seen filming on-location in April 2016 with Bright and Dyer. Inside Soap called Neville Belinda's "scumbag husband" and a "cruel swinger".

== Jenny Rawlinson ==
Jenny Rawlinson
- EastEnders character
- Portrayed by: Amy Marston
- First appearance: Episode 5313; 11 July 2016
- Last appearance: Episode 5314; 12 July 2016
- Introduced by: Sean O'Connor
In-universe information
- Sons: Paul Coker

Jenny Rawlinson, played by Amy Marston, appears in two episodes on 11 and 12 July 2016. She is Paul Coker's (Jonny Labey) mother, and it was reported that she would cause tension for Paul's paternal grandparents, Pam Coker (Lin Blakley) and Les Coker (Roger Sloman) and that Paul may not know who she is.

Jenny arrives in Walford and watches Pam, Paul and Les arrive after Les is discharged from hospital following a heart attack. Later, she watches Paul in The Queen Victoria pub, and later still, she visits Pam at her home, saying she is there about her son, Paul. Pam immediately ejects her from the house and tells her never to come back, slamming the door on her. The next day, she visits Paul who is working at Pam's flower stall and immediately cries, but says it is because her friend has just come out of hospital. Paul says his grandfather has as well, so Jenny asks about his family and she is shocked to discover Paul's father, Laurie, is dead and that Pam has told him his mother never wanted him. She purchases flowers from Paul and takes them to Pam for Les. Pam says she is not welcome, but Jenny says she has changed her life and no longer wants people to control her life, including Pam. She begs Pam to let her see Paul and gives Pam her telephone number. Pam then realises that Jenny has spoken to Paul already, and when Les comes in, Pam tells Jenny to take her flowers and leave, as Paul does not need her. Les then suffers a small chest pain and Pam blames Jenny for causing stress. Jenny insists she would never mean to harm Les as he was always kind to her. Paul then arrives and demands to know who Jenny is, and assumes she is the person who has been blackmailing Les and Pam over Les's cross-dressing, though he is wrong. Paul angrily tells her to leave, threatening to call the police, but after Jenny leaves, Pam worries she will still return. Paul is later killed in a homophobic attack, never knowing that Jenny is his mother, and Jenny does not attend his funeral.

== Simon Atmore ==
Simon Atmore
- EastEnders character
- Portrayed by: Tom Palmer
- Duration: 2016, 2021
- First appearance: Episode 5321; 25 July 2016
- Last appearance: Episode 6310; 20 July 2021
- Introduced by: Sean O'Connor (2016); Kate Oates & Jon Sen (2021)
In-universe information
- Mother: Diane Atmore

Simon Atmore, played by Tom Palmer, appears in six episodes between 25 July and 7 October 2016 and he appeared in one episode on 20 July 2021.

Simon is first seen greeting a friend who was arrested on suspicion of Paul Coker's (Jonny Labey) murder, outside the police station after the suspect attends a police identification line-up. Paul's boyfriend Ben Mitchell (Harry Reid), who has failed to identify the suspect in the line-up, recognises Simon as one of Paul's attackers, so Johnny Carter (Ted Reilly) photographs his car's number plate as he drives away. Ben and Jay Brown (Jamie Borthwick) use this to find an address and vow to take revenge, but are unsuccessful. Jay discovers that Simon works as an estate agent in Shoreditch and Ben reveals that it was Simon who instigated the attack. Simon later comes to Albert Square, looking for Ben and asks Ben's half-sister Louise Mitchell (Tilly Keeper) of his whereabouts but she denies seeing him. Simon sees Ben and Jay and makes a phone call, telling the person he is speaking to that he had found them.

Simon returns with the rest of the gang who killed Paul, Frankie Byrne (Leon Tennant), Neil Crossley (Chris Waller) and Tom Eden (Tom Holloway) and they kidnap Ben and Jay and lock Ben's father Phil Mitchell (Steve McFadden) under the stairs in his house. Simon and Frankie search the rest of the Mitchell's house, but they do not find Louise and she and Ben's cousin Courtney Mitchell (Alice Nokes) as they are hiding in a wardrobe. Simon and his gang drive Ben and Jay in their van to an industrial estate. Jay tricks Simon into opening the van doors by claiming that Ben has collapsed. They attempt to escape with Ben shoving Simon but Simon grabs Jay by the ankle and they easily overpower him and Ben. Simon offers to let Ben and Jay go if Ben agrees to stay quiet about what he saw on the night of Paul's death but Ben defiantly refuses and calls him a coward, telling him that he make sure the gang will all go to prison for what they did to Paul. Simon arms himself with a metal pole and threatens to kill Ben, telling the other gang members to take Ben to an empty warehouse for him to do so. Before they can do this, Ben's uncle Grant Mitchell (Ross Kemp) and cousin Mark Fowler (Ned Porteous) arrive in an attempt to rescue them and Simon and the gang flee the scene.

After being arrested following the abduction attempt, Simon attends a bail hearing in court. The judge denies bail to Simon and orders him to be remanded in custody to await trial. Simon protests his innocence, angering Paul's grandfather Les Coker (Roger Sloman) who calls him a liar. After Paul's grandmother Pam Coker (Lin Blakley) has a meeting with Simon's mother Diane Atmore (Hazel Ellerby), Diane asks Simon to plead guilty and he does so, pleading guilty to Paul's murder and kidnapping Ben and Jay. It is later revealed that Simon has been sentenced to a minimum term of 30 years in prison. Five years later, Pam calls Ben (now Max Bowden) to inform him that Simon has appealed to have his conviction overturned and has been released from prison. Ben, incensed with rage, wants revenge on Simon and asks his husband Callum Highway (Tony Clay) to get Simon's address. Callum is reluctant but agrees to use his police connection under the condition that Ben does not attack Simon. However, Ben goes back on his word and plans to attack Simon. Callum appeals to Ben's father, Phil Mitchell (Steve McFadden) to talk Ben out of revenge. Phil refuses at first but is able to get Ben to drop his attack, much to Callum's relief. However, Kheerat Panesar (Jaz Deol), still grieving the loss of his brother Jags Panesar (Amar Adatia), takes it upon himself to seek revenge on Ben's behalf and pretends to be someone offering Simon a job and arranges a meeting then brutally beats him up. Kheerat then tells a horrified Ben and Callum what he did. Several weeks later, Kheerat is arrested on suspicion of Simon's assault. However, Simon is unable to positively identify Kheerat and he is bailed pending further enquiry.

Jack Rattenbury of the Daily Star described Simon as an "openly racist thug". Laura-Jane Tyler from Inside Soap called Simon and his friends "very dangerous people", "bad guys", "wicked men", "evildoers", "merciless human beings", "violent brutes" and "villains", and said Simon showed no remorse for his "unspeakable actions", calling it a "horrendous hate crime".

== Mark Fowler Jnr ==
Mark Fowler Jnr
- EastEnders character
- Portrayed by: Ned Porteous (2016); Stephen Aaron-Sipple (2026–present)
- Duration: 2016, 2026–present
- First appearance: Episode 5331; 11 August 2016
- Introduced by: Sean O'Connor (2016); Ben Wadey (2026)
In-universe information
- Other names: Mark Fowler
- Occupation: Career criminal Mechanic
- Family: Mitchell/Fowler
- Father: Grant Mitchell
- Mother: Michelle Fowler
- Adoptive father: Tim Andrews
- Half-sisters: Vicki Fowler; Courtney Mitchell
- Grandfathers: Eric Mitchell; Arthur Fowler
- Grandmothers: Peggy Mitchell; Pauline Fowler
- Uncles: Phil Mitchell; Mark Fowler; Martin Fowler
- Aunts: Sam Mitchell
- First cousins: Ben Mitchell; Bex Fowler; Louise Mitchell; Ricky Branning; Hope Fowler; Raymond Fox; Albie Watts; Roman Allen
- Other relatives: Aunt Sal; Ronnie Mitchell; Roxy Mitchell; Billy Mitchell; Jamie Mitchell; Lola Pearce; Lexi Pearce; Charli Slater; Ian Beale; Lucy Beale; Peter Beale; Bobby Beale; Louie Beale; Jimmy Beale

Mark Fowler Jnr, played by Ned Porteous in 2016 and Stephen Aaron-Sipple from 2026 onwards, is the son of Grant Mitchell (Ross Kemp) and Michelle Fowler (Susan Tully/Jenna Russell). He appears in 13 episodes between 11 August and 9 September 2016. On 17 January 2026, it was announced that Mark would be returning to the show, with the role recast to Stephen Aaron-Sipple. Prior to this official announcement, Aaron-Sipple appeared as Mark in the show as part of a flash-forward episode on 1 January 2026, but was credited as "Man". He then started to appear regularly from 22 January 2026.

Mark is born off-screen in 1996 after his parents have a one-night stand. Michelle only tells her brother, Mark Fowler (Todd Carty), who the father is, before emigrating to the United States. Michelle is unable to attend the funeral of her father, Arthur Fowler (Bill Treacher), when she gives birth to Mark. In 2016, Phil Mitchell (Steve McFadden) contacts Mark after finding a letter in his wife's Sharon Mitchell's (Letitia Dean) handbag, who is Michelle's best friend, from Michelle addressed to his and Grant's mother Peggy Mitchell (Barbara Windsor), who has since died, about Mark. Sharon and Martin Fowler (James Bye), Mark's uncle, worry about Grant learning the truth and convince Phil not to tell him, and Michelle has told Mark that Phil is lying because he is an alcoholic who hates her. However, Mark arrives at Martin's flat. Mark goes to see Phil and asks if what he said about Tim not being his real father is true, but Phil has agreed with Sharon to not reveal the truth, so he denies even speaking to Mark. Mark decides to stay in Walford to get to know his family.

Mark is quick to join the market with Phil's ex-wife Kathy Sullivan (Gillian Taylforth), who is the aunt of Michelle, Mark and Martin, and makes fast friends with Shakil Kazemi (Shaheen Jafargholi), whom seems envious of Mark's popularity with women. Mark takes a liking to Courtney Mitchell (Alice Nokes), not knowing she is his half-sister, and both admit that they like each other. Their cousin Louise Mitchell (Tilly Keeper) tells Sharon about them, prompting her and Michelle's cousin, Ian Beale (Adam Woodyatt), to find them. Sharon, Ian and Phil find out nothing happened between Mark and Courtney, but Sharon and Ian book him tickets to return home. Mark explains that he feels at home in Walford and feels a connection with Courtney. When Courtney is a victim of a break-in, Mark comforts her, but is then confronted by Grant who assumes Mark is attacking her. Grant learns that Mark is Michelle's son and shares passing comments of his dislike of her; Mark shares that the feeling is mutual.

When Ben Mitchell (Harry Reid) and Jay Brown (Jamie Borthwick) are kidnapped by Paul Coker's (Jonny Labey) killers, Mark and Grant go to find them and they bring Ben back, but leave Jay behind. Phil tells Grant that Mark is his son. Grant stops Mark and Courtney kissing but agrees that Mark is better off not knowing the truth; however, Jane Beale (Laurie Brett) encourages Grant to tell Mark, as Mark can then make up his own mind, so Grant invites Mark to join him for a drink and a chat. Grant talks to Mark about Michelle and Tim, and Mark says he would not want a different father despite their differences, so Grant decides not to tell Mark the truth. As Mark is about to leave, he tells Sharon he worked out that Grant is his father and Sharon confirms it. However, she urges Mark not to ruin his life by getting involved with Grant. Mark then leaves to return to his mother and Tim in the United States.

When Michelle returns to Walford later in the year, she tells Sharon that Mark has a girlfriend and has moved out. However, he is not speaking to Michelle because she has broken the law in Florida for having a sexual relationship with a 17-year-old student Preston Cooper (Martin Anzor). A year and a half later, Michelle leaves Walford and goes to visit Mark, who now lives in Australia, and Vicki, to reconnect with them. She later decides to stay in Australia.

When Grant visits Walford in February 2025, Sharon reveals to him that Mark knows that Grant is his father, but decided not to reach out and is currently living in Florida. Sharon later calls Michelle about getting Mark back in contact with Grant, but Grant decides to wait until Mark is fully ready.

Of his casting, Porteous said, "Being part of two iconic families and the longest kept secret in EastEnders history is beyond exciting! I'm honoured to be here and can't wait for viewers to properly meet Mark Jr".

== Frankie Byrne, Neil Crossley and Tom Eden ==
Frankie Byrne, Neil Crossley and Tom Eden
- EastEnders character
- Portrayed by: Leon Tennant (Frankie); Chris Waller (Neil); Tom Holloway (Tom)
- First appearance: Episode 5345; 5 September 2016
- Last appearance: Episode 5364; 7 October 2016
- Introduced by: Sean O'Connor

Frankie Byrne, played by Leon Tennant, Neil Crossley, played by Chris Waller, and Tom Eden, played by Tom Holloway, each appear in four episodes between 5 September and 7 October 2016.

Frankie, Neil and Tom are members of the gang who attacked Ben Mitchell (Harry Reid) and killed his boyfriend Paul Coker (Jonny Labey) in a homophobic assault. Along with the other gang member, Simon Atmore (Tom Palmer), they kidnap Ben and Jay Brown (Jamie Borthwick). Off screen, Frankie enters their house with Simon and they attack Ben's father Phil Mitchell (Steve McFadden) when he attempts to help them, locking him under the stairs. They then search the rest of the house. They do not find Ben's half-sister Louise Mitchell (Tilly Keeper) and cousin Courtney Mitchell (Alice Nokes) as they are hiding in a wardrobe. As they flee the scene in their van, Frankie asks Simon why they had to hurt Phil and kidnap Jay as well as they had only been intending to abduct Ben, and asks what they intend to do next as a result. He also worries that they have been seen leaving. The gang drive Ben and Jay to an industrial estate, and Frankie speculates whether Jay is Ben's new boyfriend.

When Jay bangs on the inside of the van, Frankie worries that something has gone wrong. Jay claims that Ben has collapsed so the gang open the van doors, and Ben and Jay attempt to escape. Jay punches Frankie but Tom tackles Ben, injuring his shoulder and they are easily overpowered. Ben begs them to let Jay go as their argument is with him but Tom and Neil put Jay back in the van. Frankie stops Simon from attacking Ben after he taunts Simon. Frankie is shocked when Simon suggests killing Ben, claiming that he thought they were only going to scare him into keeping quiet. Frankie is reluctant to go through with it and insists that Paul's death was an accident, but Simon tells him a judge would not see it that way. Phil's brother Grant (Ross Kemp) and his son Mark Fowler (Ned Porteous) then arrive in a rescue attempt and the gang flee the scene. After being arrested off-screen following the abduction attempt, the gang appear at a bail hearing in court. The judge denies bail to Frankie, Tom and Neil and orders them to be remanded in custody to await trial. Frankie, Tom and Neil plead guilty to all the charges against them, for Paul's murder and kidnapping Ben and Jay. Frankie, Neil, Tom and Simon are then later sentenced each to a minimum term of 30 years in prison, off screen.

Jack Rattenbury of the Daily Star described them as "openly racist thugs". Laura-Jane Tyler from Inside Soap called them "very dangerous people", "bad guys", "wicked men", "evildoers", "merciless human beings", "violent brutes" and "villains", who committed a "horrendous hate crime".

== Geraldine Clough ==
Geraldine Clough
- EastEnders character
- Portrayed by: Gwyneth Strong
- First appearance: Episode 5352; 16 September 2016
- Last appearance: Episode 5393; 29 November 2016
- Introduced by: Sean O'Connor

Geraldine Clough, played by Gwyneth Strong, first appears on 16 September 2016.

Geraldine is the leader of a female darts team from The Feathers pub who go to The Queen Victoria pub for a tournament against The Vic's team led by landlady Linda Carter (Kellie Bright). Geraldine goads Linda before the game starts. Geraldine refuses to allow Linda's husband Mick Carter (Danny Dyer) to referee the match and suggests allowing the next customer to come into the pub to be the referee. Geraldine sends a text message on her mobile phone and a man enters the pub and is chosen to be referee and Geraldine winks at him, indicating that the match is rigged and she is cheating. Linda throws the last dart and The Vic's team loses the game. Geraldine is smug and leaves with her team and it is only afterwards that Linda, Whitney Dean (Shona McGarty) and Babe Smith (Annette Badland) discover that The Feathers' team cheated.

When Kathy Sullivan (Gillian Taylforth) and Abi Branning (Lorna Fitzgerald) go to audition for the Walford Christmas show, Geraldine is in charge of the auditions and tells them that there will be a talent show instead of a nativity play. Kathy is angered by this and Geraldine asks her to leave. The next day, Kathy and Geraldine meet in the café and Geraldine reveals that after Kathy left, all the other auditionees agreed with Kathy and that the Christmas show would instead be a production of A Christmas Carol, and Geraldine puts Kathy in charge of directing it. However, when Belinda Peacock (Carli Norris) sees how upset Geraldine is, Kathy is forced to let Geraldine continue as director. Geraldine also reveals that her former husband insisted he never wanted children and waited until Geraldine was too old to have any, then left her for a barmaid and got her pregnant, leaving Geraldine childless. Geraldine later gives Kathy a copy of the script she has written for the Christmas play. Kathy is unimpressed but Geraldine ignores her concerns. She also refuses to let Kathy and Abi work backstage, instead forcing them to audition for parts.

During Kathy's audition, Geraldine spends all her time watching Keith Howard (Daniel Attwell) and does not pay attention to Kathy or to Patrick Trueman (Rudolph Walker) when he also auditions. When Kathy realises Geraldine is attracted to Keith, she calls her "a sad old cow", which Geraldine does not hear. Kathy then calls Geraldine "desperate" to her face and when Kathy once more criticises her script, Geraldine throws her out. Geraldine eventually offers the part of Scrooge to Keith, praising his performance in rehearsals, despite the rest of the cast believing that he cannot act. Patrick is angry that Geraldine cut his line from the script and she challenges the cast to leave if they do not like her work. Kathy angrily accuses Geraldine of sacking people when the event is meant to be for charity, and Geraldine reveals that the money made from the show will no longer be going to a children's charity, infuriating Kathy even more. After another poor rehearsal, Kathy confronts Geraldine over her directing methods and Geraldine is angered by this and demands that the cast choose between her and Kathy. The cast side with Kathy and a furious Geraldine leaves in tears.

Niomi Harris of OK! described Geraldine as "the tough-talking, hard-nosed rival darts leader that rubs landlady Linda up the wrong way."

== Moose ==
Moose
- EastEnders character
- Portrayed by: Sam Gittins
- Duration: 2016–2017
- First appearance: Episode 5352; 14 October 2016
- Last appearance: Episode 5604; 24 November 2017
- Introduced by: Sean O'Connor
In-universe information
- Occupation: Soldier Barman

Wayne "Moose" Parker, played by Sam Gittins, appears in three episodes between 14 October and 4 November 2016, one on 20 March 2017, and more in November 2017. Moose is an old army friend of Lee Carter (Danny-Boy Hatchard), who arrives at The Queen Victoria pub for Lee's stag party. He accidentally sprays Lee's fiancée Whitney Dean (Shona McGarty) with a fire extinguisher, and later flirts with her, calling Lee a loser and implying to Whitney that he has a large penis because a moose is "bigger than a donkey". When Lee is offered a job, Moose says he will plan a celebration. Moose returns for Lee's second stag party and arranges for the stags to go paintballing and hires a stripper for Lee. Moose later attends the wedding along with Beanbag (Jack Bence), wearing his ceremonial army uniform for the occasion. Moose and Beanbag cover Lee in golden syrup and feathers before the wedding, and Moose later assures Lee that Whitney loves him. After Lee and Whitney's relationship breaks down and Lee leaves Walford, Moose returns to collect Lee's belongings from The Queen Vic, angering Whitney and Lee's father Mick Carter (Danny Dyer) in the process. He talks to Whitney about Lee's new life in Dover, and Whitney works out that he has met somebody else. He departs after giving Whitney his phone number, saying she can talk to him at any time. In May he returns and informs Whitney that Lee wants a divorce and that he has already spoken to a solicitor. Moose visits Whitney in Walford six months later. His arrival causes tension for Whitney's new boyfriend, Woody. When Moose makes a sarcastic comment about Whitney, Woody attacks him. The next day, Whitney confronts Moose and tells him she knows his real name is Wayne and makes fun of it. Finally getting the message that Whitney is not interested in him, Moose leaves Walford.

Laura-Jane Tyler of Inside Soap called Moose "Lee's cheeky mate" and speculated that Whitney would cheat on Lee with Moose.

== Dave ==
Dave
- EastEnders character
- Duration: 2016–2018
- First appearance: Episode 5377; 31 October 2016
- Last appearance: 2018
- Introduced by: Sean O'Connor
- Species: Cat
In-universe information
- Other names: Ethel; Ethel's Little Willy; Ethel Esquire; Lucky
- Owner: Dot Cotton

Dave (also briefly called Ethel and Ethel Esquire) is a stray cat taken in by Dot Branning (June Brown), who first appears in October 2016, where he is seen sniffing around the bins in Albert Square.

After a while, Dot sees the cat when she is putting rubbish into her bin and initially shoos him away. However, the cat starts meowing on her window sill. He enters Martin Fowler (James Bye) and Stacey Fowler's (Lacey Turner) house where he licks their Christmas turkey, forcing them to throw it out. He then returns to Dot's doorstep, following her retirement party, so Dot takes the cat in. Thinking the stray cat she has taken in is a female, Dot names the cat Ethel after her friend Ethel Skinner (Gretchen Franklin). During a conversation with Patrick Trueman (Rudolph Walker) about her failing eyesight, he points out to Dot that Ethel is a male. Dot then decides that Ethel will be called Ethel's Little Willy after her friend's dog, Willy. However, she continues to call the cat Ethel and refer to him as female, and wonders if she should name him Ethel Esquire. Dot is persuaded by her step-grandchildren, Amy Mitchell (Abbie Knowles) and Ricky Mitchell (Henri Charles), to rename the cat Dave after a pet Roxy Mitchell (Rita Simons) had as a child. Dave escapes from Dot's house, but is found and returned by Dot's stepson, Jack Branning (Scott Maslen). Dave escapes again and is found by Michelle Fowler (Jenna Russell) in the launderette. He escapes again while Dot is in hospital and two of Dot's other step-grandchildren, Sonia Fowler (Natalie Cassidy) and Robbie Jackson (Dean Gaffney), believe Dave is dead after finding a dead cat in the bin. When Sonia and Robbie break the news about Dave, a nurse tells her that Dave is at the hospital.

When seeing a missing poster for Dave, Joyce Murray (Maggie Steed) reveals to her husband Ted Murray (Christopher Timothy) that she believes Dave is their missing cat, Lucky.

In May 2017, Laura-Jayne Tyler from Inside Soap praised the cat, writing, "Ethel the cat continues to shine as Walford's most successful new signing. He's always on cue, and fully toilet trained. And we can't say that of every EastEnders actor we've met over the years."

== Osman "Oz" Bolat ==
Osman "Oz" Bolat
- EastEnders character
- Portrayed by: Noah Maxwell-Clarke
- Duration: 2016–2017
- First appearance: Episode 5381; 7 November 2016
- Last appearance: Episode 5419/5420; 5 January 2017
- Introduced by: Sean O'Connor
In-universe information
- Occupation: Customer service representative

Osman "Oz" Bolat, played by Noah Maxwell-Clarke, first appears on 7 November 2016.

Oz is a colleague of Lee Carter's (Danny-Boy Hatchard) at the call centre where Lee works. As Lee struggles with making sales, a confident Oz goads him, telling Lee that he had taken bets with their colleagues as to whether Lee would come back into work after previously calling in sick. Lee squares up to Oz when he makes a derogatory comment about Lee's wife Whitney Carter (Shona McGarty) after seeing Lee's photo of her, causing their supervisor, Haroon Zaman (Silas Carson) to intervene and break up the fight. The following day, Haroon asks Lee to work with Oz so he can gain some tips. Lee watches as Oz makes a successful sale. After work, as Lee and Oz are leaving, Whitney arrives to surprise Lee and sees Oz, then asks to meet Lee's employees, which amuses Oz when he realises that Lee has lied to Whitney about his job.

The following week, Oz answers a call from Whitney on Lee's mobile phone whilst Lee is making a sales call. Oz reveals that Whitney wanted to know if he had put a deposit on a flat they were looking for. Oz gloatingly tells Lee that he should have told Whitney that Lee could not afford a cardboard box. Oz is further amused when Lee asks Haroon for an advance on his wages and is turned down and continues to taunt him. Later, Oz presses the loudspeaker button on Lee's phone, revealing that he is talking to a recorded message, and laughs when Lee gets angry after losing out on another sale and rips off his headset. When Lee returns to work after calling in sick, Oz reveals that he knows Lee was lying about being ill and threatens to reveal it to Haroon, and Lee angrily shoves him. Lee later apologises to Oz, insisting it will not happen again. Oz menacingly agrees, revealing that he has cut part of Lee's jacket. The Queen Victoria pub, where Lee's family live and work, is robbed by three men armed with baseball bats, during which Lee's brother Johnny Carter (Ted Reilly) is hit in the face, a necklace is taken from Lee's mother Linda Carter (Kellie Bright), the lead robber grabs Lee's 18-month-old brother Ollie Carter to stop Lee's father Mick Carter (Danny Dyer) from attacking him before putting Ollie down and fleeing, and one of the robbers drops his wallet, which Lee picks up.

The following week it is revealed that Lee arranged for Oz and their colleagues Connor Parry (Ross-Anthony McCormack) and Sid Yexley (Tommy French) to carry out the robbery, and it had been Oz who had taken the money and necklace and grabbed Ollie. Oz is angry at Connor for dropping his wallet and risking them being identified. Lee angrily confronts Oz, Connor and Sid, telling them his family are now terrified and he was not expecting them to be armed. Oz reminds Lee that he had planned the robbery and had no right to blame anybody else for what happened. Oz later explains that they will split the money and each get £1,255 but he refuses to give Lee his share, due to him being unable to get Whitney out of the pub as he had agreed, as she could have recognised Oz. The next day, Lee informs Oz that the police are searching the pub for fingerprints. Oz angrily tells Lee that if the police discover he was involved in the robbery, he will tell them of Lee's involvement. After two of the perpetrators are arrested for the robbery and implicate Lee, he is also arrested but is released without charge. Lee returns to work after Christmas and is shocked to see that Oz is at work as well. Oz visits the Vic, claiming to be a friend of Lee's. Mick tells Oz about the robbery, saying two people were arrested for it, and gives him a free drink. Lee angrily tells Oz to leave but he refuses, claiming that he knows that Lee will not tell the police about him due to fear of his family discovering the truth. He then demands alcohol from a surplus Mick had ordered for New Year's Eve and Lee reluctantly gives it to him.

The next day at work, Oz listens as Lee makes a sale to an elderly woman, and afterwards, he tells Lee that the woman would probably lose money due to having to leave her current energy contract and pay for a new one, and jokes that she might die from shock when she realises this. After Lee passes his probationary review, Oz catches Lee crying in a lift as he is leaving, and laughs at him. Oz attempts to take a photo of Lee on his mobile phone and calls him a "crybaby girl". Lee angrily shouts at Oz that at least he had a heart, friends, family and a wife, but Oz tells Lee he would not have any of them if they knew how spineless Lee is, claiming that he never expected Lee to steal from his family, and that Whitney would leave him when she meets a "real man". Lee eventually confesses his part in the robbery to Mick and also tells him of Oz's involvement and Mick demands Oz's address from Lee. Mick leaves the pub and returns later with blood on his knuckles, implying that he has beaten up Oz. The next day at work, Oz has a black eye and tells Lee that Mick hit him and that Lee is lucky to have a father who can fight his battles for him. Oz then suggests that they avoid each other from then on.

David Brown of Radio Times described Oz as a "slick call centre alpha male", a "loathsome figure", "conceited and complacent", a "bully boy" and "smug", and listed five reasons to hate the character.

== Fred Cole ==
DC Fred Cole
- EastEnders character
- Portrayed by: Victor Gardener
- Duration: 2016–2017, 2019
- First appearance: Episode 5404; 19 December 2016
- Last appearance: Episode 6012; 24 October 2019
- Introduced by: Sean O'Connor (2016); Kate Oates and Jon Sen (2019)
In-universe information
- Occupation: Police officer

DC Fred Cole, played by Victor Gardener, appears in two episodes on 19 and 25 December 2016 and two on 15 and 16 May 2017. Cole also makes a reappearance on 24 October 2019.

He is a police officer who visits The Queen Victoria public house. Landlady Linda Carter (Kellie Bright) assumes he is from the council and thanks him for the Christmas tree in Albert Square, but he reveals his warrant card and tells Linda that he is investigating the theft of the tree from outside Walford town hall. Cole then questions Linda's husband Mick Carter (Danny Dyer) over the theft, revealing that a man fitting his description was caught on CCTV taking part in the theft and shows him a video of him dancing after taking the tree. He asks Mick to dance, which Mick does, enabling Cole to positively identify him. He then tells Mick that if the tree is returned that night then no further action will be taken.

Cole visits The Queen Vic on Christmas Day, and arrests Lee Carter (Danny Hatchard) on suspicion of conspiracy to commit robbery. Five months later, he arrests Jack Branning (Scott Maslen) for assaulting Charlie Cotton (Declan Bennett). He questions Honey Mitchell (Emma Barton) as a witness and she asks him to go easy on Jack as he is still grieving for his wife Ronnie Branning (Samantha Womack). Two years later, he arrests Ben Mitchell (Max Bowden) for various crimes after Martin Fowler (James Bye) reports him.

John James Anisiobi of the Daily Mirror described DC Cole as "a silver haired handsome man with a knack for solving crimes".

== Karen Beckworth ==
Karen Beckworth
- EastEnders character
- Portrayed by: Sally Rogers
- First appearance: Episode 5413; 29 December 2016
- Last appearance: Episode 5414; 30 December 2016
- Introduced by: Sean O'Connor
In-universe information
- Occupation: Car park attendant

Karen Beckworth, played by Sally Rogers, appears in two episodes on 29 and 30 December 2016. She is a parking attendant, who sees Lee Carter (Danny Hatchard) losing his temper with a payment machine. Lee shouts at Karen, claiming that he will be sacked from his job if he is late due to the machine not working, which scares her. Lee is shocked by her reaction and apologises, assuring Karen that he would not hurt her. Karen then helps Lee to get a parking ticket from the machine and reassures him that everyone has bad days.

Later that day Karen sees Lee standing at the edge of the car park roof, where he appears to be contemplating suicide. Karen attempts to talk him down and he tells her that does not know how to enjoy himself and does not feel like other people. Karen then asks Lee about his wife, Whitney Carter (Shona McGarty), after Lee ignores a telephone call from her on his mobile and Lee tells her that Whitney is now seeing his true nature. He tells Karen that his parents Mick (Danny Dyer) and Linda Carter (Kellie Bright) have a perfect relationship and that his brother Johnny (Ted Reilly) and sister Nancy (Maddy Hill) are doing well in their lives and that he cannot compete with them and that he has let his family down. Karen tells Lee that he is not a bad person and convinces him that he is loved and killing himself would not make his family feel any better, and that she knows what he is going through. As Lee climbs over the wall to jump, Karen assures him that he is not alone, begs him not to give up and convinces him to take her hand before he comes down from the edge, and she hugs him. Karen takes Lee to her office and makes him a cup of tea. She gives him a card from the Samaritans with a telephone helpline. After Lee leaves, Karen sits at her desk and cries in front of a photograph of a boy, implying that someone she knew had committed suicide.

Justin Harp from Digital Spy called Karen Lee's "guardian angel". Duncan Lindsay from the Metro praised the storyline, saying, "The performances in the exchange between Lee Carter and Karen Beckworth were highly charged", and "Sally Rogers, who first appeared as an apparently insignificant parking officer in the previous episode, also moved us incredible amounts as Karen stepped up for Lee and effectively saved his life, driven, it later transpired, by the tragedy of a young man in her own life." Lindsay added that the "scenes were difficult to watch", but said that "complemented heavily by strong writing, amazing support from the Samaritans and outstanding performances by Danny-Boy and Sally, EastEnders have got us all talking about an issue that seriously needs [to be] discussed." Shaun Kitchener from the Sunday Express called Karen's second episode "heartbreaking".

== Others ==
Character	Date(s)	Actor	Circumstances
PC Amanda Brent	1 January	Sharon Lawrence	A police officer who arrests Dean Wicks (Matt Di Angelo) for the attempted rape of Roxy Mitchell (Rita Simons).
Kay Breeze	1 January	Natasha Gordon	The registrar who marries Mick Carter (Danny Dyer) and Linda Carter (Kellie Bright).
Ricksy Hicks	4–11 January (6 episodes)	Joel Phillimore	Kyle Slater's (Riley Carter Millington) flatmate, who comes to Walford with Kyle, Sophie Dodd (Poppy Rush) and another friend, when Kyle wants to meet his half-sister Stacey Branning (Lacey Turner). While Kyle is meeting her, Sophie and Ricksy discuss their friendship with Kyle, and it is revealed that Ricksy did not know him during an important event in his life. They go to The Queen Victoria public house, and Sophie and Ricksy wait there while Kyle visits Stacey again, and when they order food, it is too salty because it has been sabotaged by Babe Smith (Annette Badland). They later leave when Kyle says things with Stacey were complicated.
Beth Graham	15 January	Georgia May	A schoolgirl who a drunken Phil Mitchell (Steve McFadden) mistakes for his daughter, Louise Mitchell (Tilly Keeper). Beth insults Phil.
Eve Igwe	22 January – 22 February (11 episodes)	Emmanuella Cole	A psychiatric nurse who assesses Stacey Branning's (Lacey Turner) mental health, and informs her boyfriend Martin Fowler (James Bye) there are no mother and baby places for Stacey and her son Arthur Fowler. Eve meets Martin again when he visits Stacey the following week, and also allows Shabnam Kazemi (Rakhee Thakrar) to visit her. She sits in on later visits with Martin, Arthur and Shabnam, and informs them that Stacey is making good progress with her review coming up soon. When Martin brings Stacey's daughter Lily Branning (Aine Garvey) to visit her, she is hostile towards Eve. Eve then sits in on Stacey's medical review, where she decides to stay in hospital voluntarily. When Stacey is transferred to another hospital, Eve goes with her and passes on Stacey's medical notes to Nurse Anya Barowski (Jade Williams).
Dr Joanne Bourne	28 January	Jane Cunliffe	The headmistress at St. Bartholomew's independent school, who meets with Ian Beale (Adam Woodyatt), his wife Jane Beale (Laurie Brett) and son Bobby Beale (Eliot Carrington), when Bobby is enrolled at the school.
Emma	28 January	Uncredited	A woman who works at St. Bartholomew's independent school.
Dr Rhys Thomas	28 January – 10 March (3 episodes)	Daniel Llewelyn-Williams	A doctor who treats Phil Mitchell (Steve McFadden) when he collapses after coughing up blood. He tells Phil's family that he needs an urgent liver transplant, and that he will die if he continues drinking. He later tells Phil that he will need to stay sober for six months before he can be put on the transplant list. Later, Phil's cousin Ronnie Mitchell (Samantha Womack) takes Phil to Dr Thomas to treat his alcoholism, but he says he cannot do anything as Phil is refusing help.
Mr Gopang	1 February	Uncredited	Shabnam Kazemi's (Rakhee Thakrar) pharmacy boss.
Judge Rosemary Pickering	5 February	Lynne Verrall	When Dean Wicks (Matt Di Angelo) has his plea hearing for the attempted rape of Roxy Mitchell (Rita Simons), Judge Pickering presides over it and Douglas is Dean's defence lawyer. Dean pleads not guilty and Douglas attempts to get him bail by stating that Dean has family ties to Walford as his daughter Jade Green (Amaya Edward) lives there. Despite this, Judge Pickering remands Dean as he has failed to surrender to bail before.
Douglas Cant	5 February	Howard Corlett	When Dean Wicks (Matt Di Angelo) has his plea hearing for the attempted rape of Roxy Mitchell (Rita Simons), Judge Pickering presides over it and Douglas is Dean's defence lawyer. Dean pleads not guilty and Douglas attempts to get him bail by stating that Dean has family ties to Walford as his daughter Jade Green (Amaya Edward) lives there. Despite this, Judge Pickering remands Dean as he has failed to surrender to bail before.
Nurse Rosie Riviera	19–22 February (2 episodes)	Criselda Cabitac	A nurse at the psychiatric hospital where Stacey Branning (Lacey Turner) is staying after suffering from postpartum psychosis. She assists when Stacey's partner Martin Fowler (James Bye) tries to take her out of the hospital, and when Stacey is transferred to another hospital, Nurse Riviera hands Martin a letter she found, not knowing that Stacey had not intended to send it to Martin.
Penny	19 February	Uncredited	The assistant to Ritchie Scott (Sian Webber), Phil Mitchell's (Steve McFadden) lawyer, who is present when Phil presents his wife Sharon Mitchell (Letitia Dean) with a letter informing her that he has filed for divorce.
Nurse Anya Barowski	22 February – 8 April (11 episodes)	Jade Williams	The primary nurse at a psychiatric hospital in Essex to which Stacey Branning (Lacey Turner) is transferred after suffering with postpartum psychosis. She bonds with Stacey over they fact they have both worked on market stalls, and helps Stacey care for her son Arthur Fowler when he is brought in to stay. Anya allows Sonia Fowler (Natalie Cassidy), Kush Kazemi (Davood Ghadami) and Dot Branning (June Brown) to visit, and tries to encourage Stacey to breastfeed and bond with Arthur. She later suggests that Stacey is ready for a home visit. Anya later tells Stacey that the doctors are going to recommend her discharge from hospital. She accompanies Stacey to a meeting where Dr Patricia Reid (Abigail Davies) confirms her recommendation for Stacey's discharge. She also reassures Stacey afterwards as she helps her pack her belongings. Stacey then says goodbye to Anya when she leaves.
Nurse Madhu Singh	23 February – 8 April (3 episodes)	Buckso Dhillon-Woolley	Arthur Fowler's primary nurse at a psychiatric hospital in Essex where his mother Stacey Branning (Lacey Turner) is being treated for postpartum psychosis. Stacey later talks to Madhu about the possibility of Dr Patricia Reid (Abigail Davies) changing her mind about discharging her and Madhu tries to reassure her. Madhu attends a meeting with Stacey along with Dr Reid, Nurse Anya Barowski (Jade Williams) and Karina Salmon (Denise Hoey), who decide that Stacey can return home. She then reunites Stacey with Arthur and bids her farewell as she leaves the hospital.
Tom Edwards	25 February 2016– 15 June 2017 (2 episodes)	David Paisley	A doctor at an STI clinic that Ben Mitchell (Harry Reid) attends when he believes he has an infection from a one-night stand with a stranger. Tom tests Ben for all STIs including HIV. The following year, he is a receptionist at the clinic. Louise Mitchell (Tilly Keeper) and Bex Fowler (Jasmine Armfield) ask him if there is an appointment for Louise (credited as "clinic receptionist").
Leo	1 March	Uncredited	A man who works with Linford Short (Leon Lopez), who Vincent Hubbard (Richard Blackwood) brings to his house to help with plans to convert his basement into a flat for his mother Claudette Hubbard (Ellen Thomas).
Delphine Rousseau	3–14 March (3 episodes)	Emmanuelle Bouaziz	A woman who collects Jack Branning (Scott Maslen) from Walford after he visits his former wife, Ronnie Mitchell (Samantha Womack). Delphine produces her wedding dress, but prevents Jack from seeing it. Honey Mitchell (Emma Barton) sees a photo of Jack and Delphine on social media with the caption "last day of freedom", and, believing Delphine is Jack's fiancée, she tells Ronnie that Jack is getting married the next day. Ronnie finds the location of the wedding and goes to stop it, but discovers that Jack is a guest at Delphine's wedding to another man, Jamie. Delphine meets Ronnie and invites her to the wedding breakfast, and Jack admits to Delphine that he still loves Ronnie. Delphine tells Ronnie to make sure she will not break Jack's heart, and to walk away if she cannot be certain she won't. It is also revealed that Delphine is Jack's former girlfriend.
Geoff Golightly	4 March	Tim Chipping	The governor of the prison where Lucas Johnson (Don Gilet) is incarcerated. Lucas's former wife, Denise Fox (Diane Parish), his son Jordan Johnson (Joivan Wade) and Patrick Trueman (Rudolph Walker) visit Geoff, so Denise can give a statement that will help get Lucas on a scheme to allow him to apply for work and more visits.
Anne	4 March	Uncredited	A customer in The Queen Victoria public house, who Linda Carter (Kellie Bright) tells that she bought her top from Bridge Street Market and that its free drinks for the first five customers who buy one to help her daughter Nancy Carter (Maddy Hill) with her new job.
DS Tony Evers	10 March	Iain Fletcher	A police officer who questions Denise Fox (Diane Parish) after Jordan Johnson (Joivan Wade) is arrested for helping his father Lucas Johnson (Don Gilet) escape prison. Evers asks if Denise was helping Jordan and she denies this. Evers takes Denise's phone and asks her to come to the police station for further questioning.
Jamie	10 March	Uncredited	Delphine Rousseau's (Emmanuelle Bouaziz) husband. Their wedding is interrupted by Ronnie Mitchell (Samantha Womack), who assumes Delphine is marrying Jack Branning (Scott Maslen).
Dr Janice May	15–17 March (2 episodes)	Emily Joyce	A doctor who treats Ollie Carter after he is hospitalised, following a seizure in his cot. She tells Ollie's parents Mick Carter (Danny Dyer) and Linda Carter (Kellie Bright), his brother Lee Carter (Danny-Boy Hatchard) and sister Nancy Carter (Maddy Hill) that his injuries were caused by a blow to the head and there is a possibility he may have suffered brain damage.
Dr Patricia Reid	17 March–7 April (2 episodes)	Abigail Davies	A doctor at the psychiatric care unit where Stacey Branning (Lacey Turner) is staying. Along with her colleague Nurse Anya Barowski (Jade Williams), she suggests that Stacey is ready for a home visit. She later recommends that Stacey is discharged from hospital.
Debs	22–24 March (2 episodes)	Uncredited	A woman who is with Kush Kazemi (Davood Ghadami) in his flat. They are caught kissing by Stacey Branning (Lacey Turner) and Martin Fowler (James Bye) when they come to talk to Kush about his and Stacey's son Arthur Fowler. Kush then asks Debs to leave. The next day she sees Kush as she is shopping on the Market.
Dr Vikram Suresh	24 March 2016 – 11 June 2019 (4 episodes)	Raj Ghatak	A doctor at the hospital who tells Mick Carter (Danny Dyer) and Linda Carter (Kellie Bright) that they can take their son Ollie Carter home after he has recovered from his seizure. He also says that it is too soon to know if Ollie has long-term brain damage as a result of his injury. Six months later, Mick and Linda take Ollie to see him for a check-up. Dr Suresh tells them that Ollie is making good progress and is developing normally for a child of his age.
Dr Owen McKenna	1 April 2016– 3 January 2017 (2 episodes)	Richard Brimblecombe	A doctor at the hospital who Mick Carter (Danny Dyer) and Linda Carter (Kellie Bright) talk to about their son Ollie Carter. Dr McKenna tells them that the outcome of Ollie's injury is too hard to predict, and that they may have to wait for his developmental milestones to find out if Ollie is brain damaged. Mick takes Ollie to see him again for another appointment, accompanied by his daughter-in-law Whitney Carter (Shona McGarty). Dr McKenna tells Mick and Whitney that Ollie is reaching all his developmental milestones and that he will not need to see him again for another twelve months.
Amelle Ellington	4 April	Sophia Brown	Jordan Johnson's (Joivan Wade) former girlfriend and mother of JJ Johnson (Zayden Kareem), who Jordan has claimed to have died from a drug overdose. After Patrick Trueman (Rudolph Walker) contacts social services when Jordan is arrested, Denise Fox (Diane Parish) learns from social worker Hilary Taylor (Sadie Shimmin) that Amelle is alive. Hilary and Amelle visit JJ and Denise, but he hides under the table. Amelle tells Denise that she has never taken drugs, and Hilary confirms that her background tests came up with nothing. She also reveals that JJ's real name is Jamie, showing her his birth certificate to prove it, and that Jordan took him away from her. Denise learns from JJ that Jordan claimed she walked out on them because she thought he was hard work, but Denise convinces him to see Amelle. When Hilary starts talking about the possibility of more frequent visits, Denise allows JJ to live with Amelle instead. Amelle leaves with JJ.
Rachel	7 April	Uncredited	A patient at the psychiatric hospital where Stacey Branning (Lacey Turner) has been admitted. Stacey sees that Rachel is discharged but later, she returns in tears, making Stacey worry that she will not cope when she goes home.
Karina Salmon	7–14 April (2 episodes)	Denise Hoey	A support worker at the psychiatric hospital where Stacey Branning (Lacey Turner) is staying with her son Arthur Fowler after suffering with postpartum psychosis. Karina attends a meeting with her colleagues Dr Patricia Reid (Abigail Davies), Nurse Anya Barowski (Jade Williams) and Nurse Madhu Singh (Buckso Dhillon-Woolley) who recommend that Stacey is discharged, and Karina tells Stacey she will support her as she adjusts to life back at home. Karina later visits Stacey as she prepares a family lunch at her flat and is impressed with her progress.
Jill Hanson	19 April	Elly Condron	A woman who arrives at Beale's restaurant for a date with Masood Ahmed (Nitin Ganatra) after arranging it on a dating website. On arriving, she knocks Carmel Kazemi's (Bonnie Langford) drink onto her. She tells Carmel that she is meeting Masood, and Carmel and Denise Fox (Diane Parish) reveal he is already there. Masood is older than Jill expected so she goes to leave without meeting him, and Denise, Carmel and Ian Beale (Adam Woodyatt) tell her that Masood is a good person and ask her to stay, but she leaves anyway.
Judge Lionel Hale	27 April	Patrick Pearson	The judge who sentences Jay Brown (Jamie Borthwick) to 150 hours of unpaid work and signing the Sex Offender Register for five years, for having sexually explicit photos of 14-year-old Linzi Bragg (Amy-Leigh Hickman) on his phone, though takes mitigating factors into a count, meaning Jay is not given a custodial sentence.
Rodney Bragg	27 April	Rhys Yates (actor)	One of Thelma Bragg's (Lorraine Stanley) sons and brother of 14-year-old Linzi Bragg (Amy-Leigh Hickman), who attends court when Jay Brown (Jamie Borthwick) pleads guilty to having sexually explicit photos of Linzi on his phone and is given a non-custodial sentence. Later, Rodney and his two brothers beat up Jay.
Aamal Rahman	27 April	Uncredited	Winners of Pride of Walford Awards. Aamal wins Walford's Top Teacher, and Will and Claire are colleagues of Sonia Fowler (Natalie Cassidy) and Tom Pepper (Tristram Summers).
Will	27 April	Uncredited	Winners of Pride of Walford Awards. Aamal wins Walford's Top Teacher, and Will and Claire are colleagues of Sonia Fowler (Natalie Cassidy) and Tom Pepper (Tristram Summers).
Claire	27 April	Uncredited	Winners of Pride of Walford Awards. Aamal wins Walford's Top Teacher, and Will and Claire are colleagues of Sonia Fowler (Natalie Cassidy) and Tom Pepper (Tristram Summers).
Laura Crowe	29 April – 2 May (2 episodes)	Tallulah Sheffield	Laura is a woman who Masood Ahmed (Nitin Ganatra) meets on an online date matching service. He meets her in The Queen Victoria public house and she reveals that she is an estate agent, while Masood tells her he works in communications. She leaves shortly afterwards to return to work, after they agree to meet up again that evening. Laura arrives late for her second date with Masood and tells him she wants to go to a casino, so he withdraws a large amount of cash from his bank account. As he attempts to hail a taxi, Laura and Ozzy mug him, taking his wallet and making fun of his job as a postman. When Masood tries to stop them, Ozzy punches him in the face, knocking him to the ground. Ozzy and Laura then run off.
Ozzy Fletcher	2 May	Gareth Berliner	
Marc Zuccaroli	3 May	Clive Hayward	Stacey Branning's (Lacey Turner) psychiatrist who she meets to discuss her progress. She tells him that she feels positive and that breathing exercises prevent her from feeling anxious. He also discusses Stacey's new bipolar medication with her.
Nurse Olivia Song	4 May 2016– 17 July 2017 (3 episodes)	Mia Foo	A nurse who treats Roxy Mitchell (Rita Simons) after she is assaulted. When Roxy's sister Ronnie Mitchell (Samantha Womack) and mother Glenda Mitchell (Glynis Barber) visit her, she tells them that Roxy checked herself out of the hospital an hour previously. She treats Whitney Carter (Shona McGarty) after she is trapped under a bus that crashes into the market and viaduct. She assures Whitney's father-in-law Mick Carter (Danny Dyer) that his "wife" in safe hands.
Stuart Ashe	5 May	Andy Gillies	A man who comes to Ronnie Mitchell's (Samantha Womack) house looking for her sister Roxy Mitchell (Rita Simons). Ronnie and her mother Glenda Mitchell (Glynis Barber) accuse him of assaulting Roxy but he denies being responsible. He reveals that Roxy has something of his and threatens to kill her if it is not returned to him.
Elaine	6 May	Uncredited	A customer who buys fresh crabs from Buster Briggs' (Karl Howman) fish stall.
Dr Adam Gorman	10–12 May (2 episodes)	Ian Gelder	A doctor at the hospital who tells Peggy Mitchell (Barbara Windsor) that her breast cancer has spread to her brain and any further treatment will only delay her death for a few months and would have considerable side-effects. He urges her to consider if she wants to stop her cancer treatment.
Dr Ruth Myers	10–12 May (2 episodes)	Juliet Howland	A doctor who informs Sonia Fowler (Natalie Cassidy) that the tests done on a lump in her breast show no signs of cancer. She then suggests the option of Sonia having a double mastectomy to prevent any possibility of cancer in the future.
Andrea Pugh	20 May	Lia Burge	A police family liaison officer who meets with Phil Mitchell (Steve McFadden) to inform him that the coroner has ordered a post-mortem on the body of his mother Peggy Mitchell (Barbara Windsor).
DS Howard South	24–26 May (2 episodes)	Paul Stocker	A police officer who interviews Bobby Beale (Eliot Carrington) after he is arrested for assaulting his adoptive mother Jane Beale (Laurie Brett). South charges Bobby with causing grievous bodily harm with intent, but then overhears Bobby claiming he hurt his half-sister Lucy Beale (Hetti Bywater), and asks him about it. Bobby confesses to South that he killed Lucy and South informs his superior officer DI Samantha Keeble (Alison Newman). He is present when Bobby is questioned about Lucy's murder by Keeble and DS Cameron Bryant (Glen Wallace).
Stefan Weber	24 May	Phillip Edgerley	A surgeon at the hospital who tells Ian Beale (Adam Woodyatt) that his wife Jane Beale (Laurie Brett) needs an operation on her spine following a violent assault by her adopted son Bobby Beale (Eliot Carrington).
Dr Sandra Vole	27 May – 21 June (5 episodes)	Badria Timimi	A doctor who treats Jane Beale (Laurie Brett) in hospital after she is violently assaulted by her adopted son Bobby Beale (Eliot Carrington) and places her in a medically induced coma. She later informs Jane's husband Ian Beale (Adam Woodyatt) that they will attempt to wake Jane up. Ian asks her if Jane will suffer any long-term damage from her injuries and Dr Vole tells him that they expect Jane to regain feeling in her hands and feet soon. After Jane wakes, Dr Vole performs tests to see whether Jane has regained any feeling and reassures her that she is making good progress. After Jane is able to get out of bed and use a wheelchair, Dr Vole warns her and Ian that Jane's recovery will take a lot of work and patience. She later does a physiotherapy session with Jane, and is satisfied with her progress. Ian asks her if Jane can be transferred to a specialist spinal injuries unit in Birmingham.
Judge Evelyn Heap	31 May	Lucy Fleming	A Youth Court judge who remands Bobby Beale (Eliot Carrington) in custody after he is charged with the unlawful killing of his half-sister Lucy Beale (Hetti Bywater).
Dr Glen Mander	14 June	Ian Hughes	A doctor visited by Mick Carter (Danny Dyer) and Linda Carter (Kellie Bright) about their son Ollie's potential brain damage. They are not happy that Dr Mander does not initially know why they are there and he tells them that children develop at different rates and they need to wait to notice any differences in Ollie. Mick is frustrated by Dr Mander's lack of answers and angrily leaves.
PC Anthony Harrison	14 June 2016– 14 December 2017 (3 episodes)	Maxwell Tyler	A police officer who brings Sylvie Carter (Linda Marlowe) to The Queen Victoria public house. He informs Sylvie's grandson Mick Carter (Danny Dyer) that she had been discovered on a bus with no money or identification but had mentioned the pub, which is why the police had brought her there. Harrison leaves Sylvie with Mick and his wife Linda Carter (Kellie Bright). He later arrests Lauren Branning (Jacqueline Jossa) for a breach of the peace after she chains herself to the community centre.
Judge Harriet Steele	16 June	Jenny Howe	A judge who sentences Bobby Beale (Eliot Carrington) to three years youth custody for the unlawful killing of his half-sister Lucy Beale (Hetti Bywater) and causing grievous bodily harm upon his adoptive mother Jane Beale (Laurie Brett) with intent.
Chris Worwood	16 June	Sophie Duval	The prosecution barrister at Bobby Beale's (Eliot Carrington) sentencing for killing his half-sister Lucy Beale (Hetti Bywater) and causing grievous bodily harm upon his adoptive mother Jane Beale (Laurie Brett) with intent.
Sammy Broomhill	16 June	Helen Keeley	A social worker who visits The Queen Victoria public house to assess Sylvie Carter's (Linda Marlowe) living arrangements. She tells Sylvie's grandson Mick Carter (Danny Dyer) and his wife Linda Carter (Kellie Bright) that Sylvie has made inappropriate sexual advances towards residents at her care home. She also tells Sylvie's daughter Tina Carter (Luisa Bradshaw-White) not to encourage her delusions. As she is leaving, Sammy tells Linda that Sylvie will not be a priority for social services as she has adequate housing and a family to take care of her.
Dr Melissa Keyes	17 June	Gina Issac	A hospital consultant who Sonia Fowler (Natalie Cassidy) meets, along with her former husband Martin Fowler (James Bye), to discuss options to prevent her getting breast cancer. Sonia tells her that she wants to have both a mastectomy and an oophorectomy. She remarks that Sonia is very young for taking the options, but Sonia is determined, so Dr Keyes arranges for her to see a clinical psychologist and informs her that the process would last for a period of nine months.
Dessie Dunn	23 June	Ben Onwukwe	A garage owner with whom Jay Brown (Jamie Borthwick) has a job interview. Jay tells him about his qualifications and denies having a criminal record, and Dessie requests a reference from Jay's previous employer Phil Mitchell (Steve McFadden). Phil's son Ben Mitchell (Harry Reid) rings Dessie pretending to be Phil, but Dessie realises it is not him. Jay is forced to tell him that he does have a criminal record and is on the sex offender's register. Dessie leaves the pub without giving Jay the job.
Dhal	4 July	Uncredited	An employee of Coker and Sons funeral directors who is carrying Peggy Mitchell's (Barbara Windsor) coffin, but when Peggy's son Phil Mitchell (Steve McFadden) asks to carry it, Billy Mitchell (Perry Fenwick) tells Dhal to allow Phil to take his place.
Big Nige	4 July	Uncredited	An employee of Coker and Sons funeral directors who removes floral wreaths from the hearse at Peggy Mitchell's (Barbara Windsor) funeral.
PC Adams	8 July	Neil Linpow	A police officer who arrests Gavin Sullivan (Paul Nicholas).
Chris	8 July	Uncredited	Two police officers who PC Adams (Neil Linpow) tells to look for Gavin Sullivan (Paul Nicholas).
Martin	8 July	Uncredited	Two police officers who PC Adams (Neil Linpow) tells to look for Gavin Sullivan (Paul Nicholas).
Marcia Drabble	11 July 2016– 16 February 2017 (3 episodes)	Sarah Belcher	A doctor who treats Jane Beale (Laurie Brett) at the hospital. She tells Jane's husband, Ian Beale (Adam Woodyatt) and his adoptive son Steven Beale (Aaron Sidwell), that Jane has given up her physiotherapy. Steven asks her if Jane could recover more easily at home and Marcia tells him that Jane would need a lot of support. The following day, Marcia visits Ian at home and he shows her the adaptations he wants to make to the house to accommodate Jane. He and Steven also talk her through their care plan for Jane. Ian and Jane visit her seven months later to discuss Jane's progress. She tells them that although Jane is making great progress, they can no longer afford anymore physiotherapy, but informs them that Jane could have private therapy.
Chris Hancock	12 July	Simon Tcherniak	The deputy headteacher of Janet Mitchell's (Grace) school. He informs Janet's parents Billy (Perry Fenwick) and Honey Mitchell (Emma Barton) that she is falling behind in classes and requires extra support that the school cannot afford to give her due to a lack of funding. He recommends that they look for a specialist school for Janet.
Mia Raj	12 July	Uncredited	Janet Mitchell's (Grace) learning support assistant at school who attends a meeting between Janet's parents Billy (Perry Fenwick) and Honey Mitchell (Emma Barton) and the deputy headteacher, Chris Hancock (Simon Tcherniak).
Nige	12 July 2016– 22 September 2017 (2 episodes)	Uncredited	An employee of Coker and Sons funeral directors. He is seen with Colin standing at the back of Steven Beale's (Aaron Sidwell) funeral.
Ze	15 July	Uncredited	A market trader who is asked by Paul Coker (Jonny Labey) to pack Pam Coker's (Lin Blakley) stall away and is thanked by Ben Mitchell (Harry Reid) for doing so.
DC Angie Rice	18 July – 10 October (8 episodes)	Martina Laird	A police officer investigating the death of Paul Coker (Jonny Labey). She initially believes Paul to be Ben Mitchell (Harry Reid) and informs Ben's father Phil Mitchell (Steve McFadden) and half-brother Ian Beale (Adam Woodyatt) of his death. She then arranges for Phil and Ian to identify Ben's body and they discover that it is Paul instead. Rice then visits Paul's grandparents, Les (Roger Sloman) and Pam Coker (Lin Blakley) to inform them of his death. She escorts them to the mortuary to identify Paul's body and stops Les from touching him. After Ben gives a statement to the police, Rice and DI Graeme McKay (James Weber Brown) visit him at home to question him further, after Ian tells them that Paul and Ben were in a relationship and Ben had not mentioned this, claiming that the attack was a random mugging; Ben does not change his statement. Rice returns Ben's mobile phone and suggests that the attack was homophobic but he denies this. Rice gives Ben her card to contact her if he has any further information. Ben later admits to Rice that he lied and that the attack was homophobic. Rice tells him that they are following up leads in the investigation. After Ben sees one of Paul's attackers driving away from the police station and reports this, he contacts Rice and she visits him at home and informs him that the suspect has been released on bail. He accuses the police of not wanting to help him because he is a Mitchell, but she reveals that the suspect has an alibi and the evidence is still being processed. She leaves after telling Ben she will contact him when they have more information. Rice returns and informs Ben that the suspects' alibis had been discredited but they had fled after the police had received a tip-off that Ben and Jay Brown (Jamie Borthwick) were going after them. Rice warns Ben not to take the law into his own hands and leaves. Rice later attends the killers' plea hearing. The following week she visits Les and Pam and informs them that the killers will be sentenced the following day.
DI Graeme McKay	19 July 2016– 18 August 2017 (3 episodes)	James Weber Brown	A police officer investigating the murder of Paul Coker (Jonny Labey). He apologises to Ian Beale (Adam Woodyatt) and Phil Mitchell (Steve McFadden) for wrongly identifying Ian's half-brother and Phil's son Ben Mitchell (Harry Reid) as the victim. McKay says they need to find Ben as he is a witness, so Ian tells McKay that Paul was Ben's boyfriend. McKay tells Phil to go home and wait for Ben to return. After Ben gives a statement to the police, claiming that the attack was a random mugging, McKay and DC Angie Rice (Martina Laird) visit him at home and question him further. Ben does not change his statement and gets angry when McKay asks why Ben did not reveal that he and Paul were in a relationship, telling McKay that he did not think it was relevant.
Barney	5 August	Scott Wickes	A man in The Queen Victoria public house. He and his friend ask if they serve organic food, and then he interrupts Grant Mitchell (Ross Kemp) as he is about to order. Barney invites Belinda Peacock (Carli Norris) to join him and his friend, but Grant tells him to "back off".
Hannah	12 August	Uncredited	A nurse who visits Jane Beale (Laurie Brett) at home.
Liz	18 August	Uncredited	A market trader.
Suzanne	25 August	Uncredited	A nurse who visits Jane Beale (Laurie Brett) at home.
Irma Fletcher	25 August	Vinny Dhillon	A representative for Walford Council who visits Billy (Perry Fenwick) and Honey Mitchell (Emma Barton) to discuss their daughter Janet Mitchell's (Grace) schooling. She tells them that Janet will be assessed both at school and at home and that ultimately it will be up to them to decide whether Janet stays in the school she is already in or goes to a specialist school.
Jerome	26 August 2016– 23 February 2017 (8 episodes)	Uncredited	Mechanics working at Phil Mitchell's (Steve McFadden) garage, who are both seen various times there. Phil's son, Ben Mitchell (Harry Reid), who also works at the garage, buys Ethan a drink in The Queen Victoria public house on their last day working before Christmas, and tells Phil that Jerome will be along later. Ethan is seen in the background when Billy Mitchell (Perry Fenwick) and Tina Carter (Luisa Bradshaw-White) are talking to each other on the swings, and when Ben tells him he is looking for Jay. Ben later mentions that Ethan and Jerome have quit their jobs.
Ethan	26 August 2016– 10 April 2017 (9 episodes)	Uncredited	
Eddie Tsang	29–30 August (2 episodes)	Kevin Shen	A man who Dot Branning (June Brown) witnesses trying to get into the launderette, where she works. He later visits Dot at home, causing her to panic, and he delivers a letter addressed to her. It is subsequently revealed that Eddie is marrying Dot's old friend Colin Russell (Michael Cashman), and Dot attends the wedding offscreen. However, by 2022, Colin is left a widower following Eddie's death from cancer.
Natalie	2 September	Uncredited	A woman who dances with Masood Ahmed (Nitin Ganatra) at Kim Fox-Hubbard's (Tameka Empson) salsa show in the community centre.
Claire Raymond	6 September	Chiron Miller	A paramedic who treats Phil Mitchell (Steve McFadden) after he collapses after being assaulted by a gang who kidnapped his son Ben Mitchell (Harry Reid). Phil's daughter Louise Mitchell (Tilly Keeper) tells her that Phil's injuries had been caused by him falling off a ladder whilst painting.
Miriam "Mim" Crabbe	8–9 September (2 episodes)	Helen Cotterill	Pam Coker's (Lin Blakley) sister. She arrives for the funeral of her great-nephew Paul Coker (Jonny Labey), and convinces Pam to say a final goodbye to Paul in the chapel of rest before the funeral service. She then attends the wake in The Queen Victoria public house and accuses Pam's husband Les Coker (Roger Sloman) of not being there for her.
Gloria	8 September – 20 October (4 episodes)	Uncredited	A nurse who visits Jane Beale (Laurie Brett) at home.
Maggie Young	12 September – 3 October (2 episodes)	Robyn Lewis	A district nurse who visits Jane Beale (Laurie Brett) at home and gives her an enema. She visits Jane again and helps her get dressed in the morning and brushes her hair.
Russell	13 September	Uncredited	A man who runs the market's shellfish stall. Although not specifically named in this episode, he is mention by the new market inspector Carmel Kazemi (Bonnie Langford) in the previous episode when she tells Buster Briggs (Karl Howman) to sell his oysters to Russell and get back to his right market pitch. Russell is then seen in this episode selling them to a customer on his stall.
Mia Holloway	15 September	Alix Ross	A nail technician who works at Belinda Peacock's (Carli Norris) beauty salon, Elysium, and gives a treatment to Bex Fowler (Jasmine Armfield).
Dr Avizeh Faraji	15 September – 21 November (2 episodes)	Shanaya Rafaat	A hepatologist who Phil Mitchell (Steve McFadden) and Ben Mitchell (Harry Reid) visit in hospital. Ben asks her about the possibility of donating part of his liver to Phil and how he can find out if he is a match. She explains that Phil still needs to be accepted onto the cadaveric list and have been sober for six months, and that they need to consider the risks to Ben due to the high mortality rate in liver transplants. After Phil leaves, Ben tells Dr Faraji that he is young and healthy and is adamant he wants to go through with the operation, but she tells him that there are still no guarantees and gives Ben some literature to read before he leaves. Two months later, Phil visits her again along with his wife Sharon Mitchell (Letitia Dean) and daughter Louise Mitchell (Tilly Keeper). She commends Phil for staying sober for six months and says that she will refer him for assessment to the transplant list. After running some tests, she tells Phil that his liver is showing no signs of recovery and that on average, most people with livers in similar condition to Phil's do not survive for more than a year. Dr Faraji then explains that she will refer Phil to a specialist liver transplant unit.
Jørgen Christensen	15 September 2016– 24 August 2017 (10 episodes)	Christopher Dane	Denise Fox's (Diane Parish) GCSE English Literature teacher. He praises her for doing well in the class. Afterwards, Jørgen invites Denise to come with the rest of the class to The Queen Victoria public house for drinks when Carmel Kazemi (Bonnie Langford) arrives drunk, so Denise takes her home, leaving Jørgen to go to the pub without her. Three months later, when Denise is asked to find a script for the Walford Players' production of A Christmas Carol, Jørgen suggests that she write her own script. Jørgen later invites Denise for Christmas drinks and informs her that she is the best student in his class. Jørgen attends the performance of the Christmas Play and brings a reporter with him from the local newspaper to review the play, introducing her to Denise. Jørgen gives Denise a "B" grade for an essay she writes and tells her that he believes she could improve her grades. Denise arrives late for her next class. Jørgen tells the class that Denise gave birth to a baby boy. Denise's sister Kim Fox-Hubbard (Tameka Empson) walks in during the middle of the class where she reveals that Denise gave her baby up for adoption and takes out breast pads from Denise's handbag, humiliating Denise. When the class is over, Jørgen comforts Denise. Denise's boyfriend Kush Kazemi (Davood Ghadami) later approaches Jørgen and asks him if Denise is allowed to have time off. Jørgen tells Kush that Denise can have as much time off as she needs. Jørgen is later seen in the café, helping Denise revise for her exams. After hearing about Denise's collapse, Jørgen comes to Denise's house to make sure she is okay. They later go out for ice cream together.
Renu Jussun	16 September 2016 – 12 June 2018 (2 episodes)	Sukh Ojla	A nurse who Lee (Danny Hatchard) and Whitney Carter (Shona McGarty) go to see for a baby scan at the hospital. After they leave, Denise Fox (Diane Parish) visits Renu for her scan. Renu runs tests for Down's syndrome due to Denise's age, 47, and explains that the risks of disabilities increase due to the age of the mother. She then tells Denise that the bridge of her baby's nose appears normal. Two years later, she gives Kim Fox-Hubbard (Tameka Empson) a baby scan after she faints.
Diane Atmore	19 September – 7 October (3 episodes)	Hazel Ellerby	Simon Atmore's (Tom Palmer) mother who attends a bail hearing when he is charged with the murder of Paul Coker (Jonny Labey). Paul's grandmother Pam Coker (Lin Blakley) comforts her in the toilets, unaware of who she is and only realises when Diane enters the courtroom and exchanges looks with Simon. Diane is distraught when Simon is refused bail. Diane later meets up with Pam and Kathy Sullivan (Gillian Taylforth) in a café after Pam asks to see her, wanting an explanation for Simon's actions. Pam shows Diane photographs of Paul and asks Diane questions about Simon's childhood and upbringing. Diane reveals that Simon had a normal happy childhood. Kathy reassures Diane, who feels guilty, telling her that Simon is a grown man and is responsible for his own actions. Diane admits that she is ashamed of Simon and reveals that he intends to plead not guilty at his trial, horrifying Pam. Diane refuses to convince Simon to change his mind and asks Pam if she would do the same thing if the situation was reversed. Later in the week Diane attends the gang's sentencing hearing. She tells Pam that she has changed her mind and asked Simon to plead guilty and he does so. Afterwards, Pam tells Diane that she is still unhappy despite the guilty plea. Diane is understanding and tells Pam to look after herself and leaves.
Jemima Benjamin	29–30 September (2 episodes)	Emily Bowker	A human resources consultant who interviews Dot Branning (June Brown) for a job at a new dry cleaners that is replacing the launderette where Dot previously worked. Dot is confused by the language and terminology Jemima uses whilst questioning her. When Jemima reveals that Dot's former boss, Mr Papadopolous (Lee Warner), had believed that she would want to retire, Dot becomes angry and leaves the interview. The following day, Jemima returns and informs Dot that she has not got the job.
Clive Morris	30 September	Julian Bird	A friend of Vincent Hubbard (Richard Blackwood) who he pays to pose as a driving instructor to give his wife Kim Fox-Hubbard (Tameka Empson) a driving lesson to help her pass her test. Vincent explains to Kim that Clive is actually a former getaway driver who has served time in prison. After the lesson, Clive tells Vincent that Kim is a terrible driver and has no chance of passing a driving test.
Estate Agent Rob	3–4 October (2 episodes)	Cameron Jack	An estate agent who meets Carmel Kazemi (Bonnie Langford) when she wants to move into Masood Ahmed's (Nitin Ganatra) old house. Later, Carmel and Donna Yates (Lisa Hammond) use Masood's keys to enter the house and measure up the property. Rob comes in, having seen the lights on, and Carmel and Donna attempt to hide but Rob sees them. Rob helps Carmel to move a sofa, and she flirts with him. When he asks if he can help with anything else, Carmel says his wife must be wondering where he is, to which he says he is divorced. Carmel thanks Rob for his help and he leaves.
Harry	13–14 October (2 episodes)	Matt Weyland	An employee at Coker and Sons Funeral Directors, who disobeys the new manager Billy Mitchell's (Perry Fenwick) orders to collect some ashes, saying he will do it the next day. Billy orders him to collect the ashes, threatening to fire him if he does not, so Harry agrees. Harry then attends a farewell celebration when Les Coker (Roger Sloman) retires and moves away.
Katie Wagstaff	17 October	Lesley Harcourt	A hepatology consultant who Ben Mitchell (Harry Reid) visits to discuss donating part of his liver to his father Phil Mitchell (Steve McFadden). Ben's mother Kathy Sullivan (Gillian Taylforth) interrupts the appointment and Katie reassures her that Ben would not be referred to a transplant centre until Phil had been sober for at least six months. Katie explains what would happen if Ben did not ahead with the transplant and talks him through the risks. Kathy then tells Katie about the deaths of Ben's grandmother Peggy Mitchell (Barbara Windsor) and boyfriend Paul Coker (Jonny Labey) and explains that Ben is going through with the transplant to make himself feel better about his grief. Katie arranges for Ben to see a psychologist before going to the transplant centre.
Tom Eastman	17 October	Alan Thompson	A customer at Coker and Sons funeral home, who faints while he is waiting to arrange his wife's funeral. Billy Mitchell (Perry Fenwick) finds him and worries he has died, but he wakes up and Billy is relieved. Tom then talks to Billy about his wife, Rosie, who has died after 62 years of marriage. Billy comforts him and Tom is impressed, telling Billy that owner, Les Coker (Roger Sloman), had left the undertakers in good hands.
Megan	20 October	Uncredited	A nurse who visits Jane Beale (Laurie Brett) at home.
Brian	20 October	Uncredited	A City banker who Belinda Peacock (Carli Norris) chats to in The Queen Victoria public house in the hope that a liaison will lead to a solution for her debt problems. Brian spends the night with Belinda but she discovers he is married and she wasted her time.
Mike Rendon	21 October – 15 November (4 episodes)	Bailey Patrick	A drug dealer who Jay Brown (Jamie Borthwick) owes money to. Mike watches as Jay takes Will Mitchell (Freddie Phillips) and Dennis Rickman (Bleu Landau) home, and Dennis notices him staring at them. Jay later meets up with Mike and gives him some of the money from the safe at the funeral home. Mike tells Jay that he owes him interest and gives him two weeks to pay the rest of the money, threatening to kill him otherwise. After Jay ignores several text messages from him, Mike spots Jay on Bridge Street and chases after him but Jay is able to get away. Later that day, Jay meets up with Mike and his gang, and reveals that he does not have the money he owes and challenges Mike to either beat him up or force Jay to work for him. Mike gives Jay cocaine and orders him to sell it within the day. The following day, Mike visits Jay at the Mitchells' house and Jay begs him for more time to obtain the money. Mike gives him until midday. After Phil Mitchell (Steve McFadden) discovers Jay is dealing drugs, he insists Jay reports Mike to the police. Jay does so and later tells Phil that the police are arresting Mike.
Kacey Broderick	25 October	Mica Williams	A carer who takes Jane Beale (Laurie Brett) shopping.
Beanbag	28 October 2016– 10 February 2017 (3 episodes)	Jack Bence	An army friend of Lee Carter's (Danny-Boy Hatchard) who attends Lee's stag party. When Beanbag meets Lee's fiancée Whitney Dean (Shona McGarty), he remarks that Lee is "punching above his weight". When Moose (Sam Gittins) hires Lee a stripper, Beanbag informs Lee that he has paid for her to give him "extras". When Lee refuses to go through with it, Beanbag brands him "soft" and has sex with the stripper himself, cheating on his wife. Beanbag then attends Lee and Whitney's wedding and gives them £50 as a wedding present, which is then stolen by Jay Brown (Jamie Borthwick). Beanbag asks Louise Mitchell (Tilly Keeper) to dance with him, but Jay warns him that she is 14, so Beanbag calls her "jailbait". Three months later, Whitney invites Beanbag out for drinks in The Queen Victoria public house with her and Lee. She tells Beanbag that Lee hates his job and asks him to speak to his boss about getting Lee a job in security with him. Beanbag admits to Lee that Whitney did this and also called him to convince him to come despite him cancelling earlier, and says that he thinks Whitney fancies him. Lee is annoyed that Whitney flirts with Beanbag.
Dr Joshua Phipps	3 November	Robert Perkins	A psychiatrist at the hospital with whom Ben Mitchell (Harry Reid) has an assessment with as he prepares to donate part of his liver to his father Phil Mitchell (Steve McFadden). Dr Phipps asks Ben why he wants to go ahead with the transplant and Ben tells him that he wants to do something good for the first time in his life. Phipps suggests that Ben is only going through with the transplant to gain Phil's approval of him and make up for mistakes he made in the past and adds that the transplant would not erase any past events. As Ben is about to leave, Phipps tells him that he is concerned for Ben's welfare if he was to go ahead with the transplant and warns him that the transplant centre would think the same thing.
Haroon Zaman	7 November – 29 December (6 episodes)	Silas Carson	Lee Carter's (Danny Hatchard) supervisor at the call centre he is secretly working at. He is forced to break up a fight between Lee and his colleague Oz Bolat (Noah Maxwell-Clarke) and demands to see Lee in his office after his shift. Haroon discovers on social media that Lee was getting married on the day he called in sick the previous week, and docks him a day's wages for doing so. The following day, Haroon criticises Lee for being at the bottom of the sales table. He orders Lee to work with Oz for the day to learn from him. When Lee loses another customer after being distracted by Oz, Haroon reminds him that he is still at the bottom of the sales board. The next day, Lee asks Haroon for an advance on his wages, but Haroon refuses. Haroon makes a further appearance when he is walking around the office when Lee angrily confronts his colleague Connor Parry (Ross-Anthony McCormack) and gives him his wallet back. When Lee returns to work after Christmas, Haroon is angry with him for being late. He stands next to Lee's work station to monitor him and demands that he makes a sale. Haroon is impressed when Lee makes a successful sales call to an elderly woman. Haroon then calls Lee into his office for a review and tells him that he has passed his probationary period by a narrow margin and orders him to improve his sales targets in the new year.
Lisa	10 November 2016– 5 January 2017 (2 episodes)	Uncredited	A colleague of Lee Carter (Danny Hatchard) and Oz Bolat's (Noah Maxwell-Clarke) at the call centre. During a work meeting, the supervisor Haroon Zaman (Silas Carson) asks Lisa to move a flipchart out of the way, and everyone laughs as she struggles with it. Lee stands up for her but Haroon dismisses him, though Lisa quietly thanks Lee. She is later seen again talking to Oz. Oz tells her the leaderboard is showing that she is selling really well.
Brett Simpson	10–11 November (2 episodes)	Steve North	Brett is a customer at Coker and Sons funeral directors who asks Billy Mitchell (Perry Fenwick) and Jay Brown (Jamie Borthwick) to arrange his mother Sally's funeral. Jay accidentally offends Brett on the phone after Brett asks to inspect the premises and Jay assumes he is a public health inspector. When Brett arrives, Billy apologises and tells him that he knew his mother when he was growing up as he used to visit her sweet shop as a child. The next day, Brett returns to view his mother's body and discovers that her rings are missing and accuses Billy of stealing them. Jay, who had stolen the rings from Sally's body, then arrives with them and tells Brett he had them cleaned professionally, which appeases Brett and he is impressed by the gesture.
Sally Simpson	10–11 November (2 episodes)	Uncredited	
Colin	10 November 2016– 22 September 2017 (2 episodes)	Uncredited	An employee at Coker and Sons Funeral Directors. He is seen with Nige standing at the back of Steven Beale's (Aaron Sidwell) funeral.
Harry Beckett	11 November 2016– 20 March 2017 (5 episodes)	Mark Bagnall	The new area manager of the Minute Mart where Denise Fox (Diane Parish) works. He arrives earlier than expected and catches Denise eating food from the chiller cabinet and orders her to pay for it. When he sees that Denise is pregnant, he says he did not know about it and suspends her from the job so he can perform a risk assessment, though Denise insists she had informed the human resources department. Harry also flirts with Denise's colleague Honey Mitchell (Emma Barton). Later, he orders the shop to be cleaned as there have been rats, and Denise is forced to do it alone. When Harry arrives at the shop, Denise tells him the rats are there because of the bins outside the shop, not because the shop is unclean, and asks him to thank her for cleaning and admit that she did a good job; he tells her she did an adequate job and reluctantly thanks her. Harry is later on his way to visit Denise when her sister Kim Fox-Hubbard (Tameka Empson) overhears him talking on his mobile phone about Denise. Kim gets into Harry's car and intimidates Harry into letting Denise keep her job at the Minute Mart, but when Harry sees Denise, he says nothing about this encounter. When he is ready to leave, Denise accuses him of being sneaky and says he will probably just send her a letter terminating her employment. Denise has a meeting at the Minute Mart headquarters with Harry and Yolande Trueman (Angela Wynter) about why she did an honest interview about the shop. Harry and Yolande tell her that she can have her job back but she needs to go on a training course before returning to work. When Denise protests that she does not need to do the course because of other commitments, Harry smirks at her, which angers Denise. Harry gives her a warning but Denise tells him that she is quitting her job at the Minute Mart and she storms out of the room. Yolande tells Harry that he should know when to keep his mouth shut and that he should do the course instead.
Maggie O'Shea	11 November	Zee Asha	An old friend of Belinda Peacock's (Carli Norris), who sends Belinda a birthday card with her telephone number in it. Belinda tells Masood Ahmed (Nitin Ganatra) that she and Maggie had made a pact at school that if they were both single at 40, they would run away together. Masood encourages Belinda to call Maggie, as they are both now divorced. Maggie arrives in her car and picks Belinda up and they drive off together to go travelling.
Mrs Phillips	14 November	Uncredited	A client at Coker and Son's Funeral Directors.
Cherish Hylton	17 November	Linette Beaumont	The leader of a female darts team called George's Dragons from another pub who come to The Queen Victoria public house for a match.
Keith Howard	22–29 November (3 episodes)	Daniel Attwell	A man who Geraldine Clough (Gwyneth Strong) invites to audition for the local Christmas show. Keith arrives later than everyone else and states that he does not know why he is there. He reveals he works as a bricklayer and stripper, and Geraldine explains that she invited him as a "natural entertainer". Geraldine is attracted to Keith and watches him continuously during the auditions. It is then revealed that Geraldine has offered Keith the lead role of Scrooge, and she praises his performance in rehearsals even though the rest of the cast complain that his acting is terrible. When Geraldine demands the cast choose between her and Kathy Sullivan (Gillian Taylforth) following an argument between the two women, she makes Keith side with her but after everyone else sides with Kathy, Keith joins them, leaving Geraldine devastated.
Connor Parry	25 November – 5 December (3 episodes)	Ross Anthony-McCormack	Two call-centre colleagues of Lee Carter (Danny-Boy Hatchard) and Oz Bolat (Noah Maxwell-Clarke), who are friends with Oz. They later participate in a robbery at The Queen Victoria public house, along with Oz, organised by Lee to pay off his debts. Connor drops his wallet during the robbery, which Lee hides. The next day, at work, Lee returns Connor's wallet to him. Oz is angry with Connor as his wallet could have identified them and he is apologetic. Lee angrily confronts Connor, Sid and Oz over the amount of violence they used in the robbery against his family who reside in the pub and the gang refuse to give Lee his share of the money. When Oz visits The Queen Vic, claiming to be a friend of Lee's, Lee's father Mick Carter (Danny Dyer) tells Oz about the robbery, explaining that the police arrested two men. The next day when Lee has a review at work, his supervisor Haroon Zaman (Silas Carson), reveals that two of Lee's colleagues were sacked, implying that it was Connor and Sid.
Sid Yexley	25 November – 5 December (3 episodes)	Tommy French	
Dr Anjali Mitra	25 November 2016– 17 March 2017 (2 episodes)	Krupa Pattani	A doctor who gives Dot Branning (June Brown) an eye examination after she experiences problems with her sight. She tells Dot that she is showing signs of age-related macular degeneration and refers her to an eye specialist. Michelle Fowler (Jenna Russell) visits her to receive sleeping pills. She asks Michelle if she has had any trouble sleeping but Michelle tells her that she only came for the sleeping pills and leaves in anger.
Agnes Novak	28 November 2016– 11 June 2018 (4 episodes)	Margaréta Szabó	An Environmental Health officer who visits the café following a complaint from Babe Smith (Annette Badland). She asks Tina Carter (Luisa Bradshaw-White) how food is stored in the fridge and is unimpressed by Tina's response, concluding that Tina does not know how to store meat properly. As a result of this, Agnes recommends the café's manager Kathy Sullivan (Gillian Taylforth) attend a training course in food hygiene. She visits The Queen Victoria public house ahead of its Polish night. When she inspects the kitchen, she sees a rat amongst the food. Shirley Carter (Linda Henry) begs her not to shut the kitchen down as the rat is there because the council have not emptied the bins outside and not because the hygiene in the kitchen is bad. Agnes gives her 24 hours to get rid of the rat. She visits the pub the next day and sees that the rat is gone but then discovers a leak in the ceiling. Landlord Mick Carter (Danny Dyer) assures her that the ceiling will be fixed. The following year, she visits Ian Beale's (Adam Woodyatt) fish and chip shop after a complaint of rats, but finds no evidence.
Dermot Haynes	29 November – 25 December (4 episodes)	Geoffrey Newland	An alcohol liaison officer at the hospital who calls Phil Mitchell (Steve McFadden) in for his tests, and later speaks to him about his liver transplant. He is later present when Phil signs the consent forms for the transplant with Phil assuring him that he understands the risks of the operation. After a liver is found for Phil, Dermot is present whilst Phil goes through his pre-operation tests and reassures him when he expresses concerns for the donor's family. When the liver is found not to be a suitable match for Phil and the operation cancelled, Dermot comforts Phil, his wife Sharon Mitchell (Letitia Dean) and Jay Brown (Jamie Borthwick). Sharon is angry with Dermot for getting their hopes up and he warns them that it could happen again in the future. Dermot then appears when Phil is admitted to hospital when another liver is found, which is suitable.
Christine Allinson	29 November	Suzann McLean	Phil Mitchell's (Steve McFadden) dietician at the hospital who tells him he will not be able to eat salt due to his liver transplant. She tells him that he will continue to be tested to see if he can go on the transplant list, but he has to want it for himself and not just for the people close to him.
Bella Okafor	29 November	Doreene Blackstock	A nurse who talks to Phil Mitchell (Steve McFadden) about his progress in keeping sober, noting that he has made positive contributions in his counselling sessions. He tells her that he is responsible for his situation, and that he started drinking because his father used to beat him and he did not want to become like him.
Liz Herdsman	29 November	Annette Flynn	A transplant co-ordinator at the hospital who Phil Mitchell (Steve McFadden) speaks to along with his wife Sharon Mitchell (Letitia Dean) and his daughter, Louise Mitchell (Tilly Keeper) about aftercare following his liver transplant operation. Liz warns them that sometimes livers are not found in time to save patients. Sharon then tells Liz that her adoptive mother Angie Watts (Anita Dobson) died of liver failure after years of alcohol abuse and that she did not want to watch her husband die in the same way, and Liz does her best to reassure her.
Marcus Greaves-Smith	1–25 December (2 episodes)	Dominic Jephcott	A doctor who Phil Mitchell (Steve McFadden) speaks to whilst preparing to undergo his liver transplant. He gives Phil consent forms to sign and Phil assures him that he understands the risks of the operation. Though this liver is unsuitable, Marcus appears again when Phil is admitted to hospital when another liver is found, which is suitable.
Harriet Summers	2 December	Tracy Forsythe	A mother and son from a pub, The Bull, who come to The Queen Victoria public house for a women's darts match. Jimmy supports Harriet but their team loses. Harriet sarcastically calls Kathy Sullivan (Gillian Taylforth) "classy" when she repeatedly chants "losers" at the team. Later, Jimmy, who is a rugby player, approaches Jane Beale (Laurie Brett), who is in a wheelchair, and offers to buy her a drink, telling her she is beautiful.
Jimmy Summers	2 December	Harry Neale	A mother and son from a pub, The Bull, who come to The Queen Victoria public house for a women's darts match. Jimmy supports Harriet but their team loses. Harriet sarcastically calls Kathy Sullivan (Gillian Taylforth) "classy" when she repeatedly chants "losers" at the team. Later, Jimmy, who is a rugby player, approaches Jane Beale (Laurie Brett), who is in a wheelchair, and offers to buy her a drink, telling her she is beautiful.
Brenda Kane	6 December 2016– 13 January 2017 (2 episodes)	Donna Berlin	A midwife who gives Denise Fox (Diane Parish) a check-up and tells her that she and her unborn baby are in good health. Denise tells her that she feels she can no longer have her sister, Kim Fox-Hubbard (Tameka Empson), as her birthing partner when she has not told Kim the truth about the baby's paternity. Brenda appears again when Denise goes into labour, and she delivers Denise's baby, a boy.
Terry	6 December	Uncredited	A friend of Kush Kazemi (Davood Ghadami) and Martin Fowler's (James Bye) that Roxy Mitchell (Rita Simons) meets at The Queen Victoria public house. They later kiss in an alleyway. Two days later, Kush tells Roxy that Terry is married with two children and his wife separated from him because he went home drunk after he met Roxy and she worked out he cheated on her.
Dr Leah Goldberg	9 December 2016– 17 February 2017 (2 episodes)	Cate Hamer	A doctor who confirms to Dot Branning (June Brown) that she is suffering from age-related Macular Degeneration. She explains to Dot that she has wet type AMD and this can be treated by having eye injections. She then tells Dot that she can start the treatment immediately but Dot refuses. Dr Goldberg then tells Dot that without the treatment she could lose her vision permanently. Two months later, she gives Dot eye injections.
Kelly	22 December	Uncredited	A woman from the Walford Gazette who attends the first night of the Walford Players' production of A Christmas Carol to review it for the newspaper.
Craig Washington	23 December	David Ajao	Lee Carter's (Danny-Boy Hatchard) neighbour. Lee takes delivery of a package addressed to Craig, opens it and pawns the virtual reality headset he finds inside. Craig later introduces himself to Lee and asks him if he has the parcel, but Lee denies having seen it. When Craig knocks on Lee's door the next day, Lee ignores him.
Nurse Amy	25 December	Uncredited	A nurse who assists Phil Mitchell (Steve McFadden), who is in hospital for a liver transplant.
Nurse Teresa Brookes	26 December 2016– 7 July 2017 (2 episodes)	Kirsty Woodward	A nurse who gives Phil Mitchell (Steve McFadden) a blood test following his liver transplant.
