= Sally Rogers =

English actress (born 1964)

- Born: 1964 (age 61–62); Marple, Cheshire, England
- Occupation: Actress
- Years active: 1989–present
- Children: 1

Sally Rogers (born 1964) is an English actress, best known for her role as DC/Sgt Jo Masters in ITV's The Bill.

Rogers trained as a children's nanny, before taking up acting at the age of 20. She studied at Webber Douglas Academy of Dramatic Art in London before working at the Royal National Theatre.

== Acting career ==
From 1989 to 1990, Rogers starred in several plays at London's Royal Court Theatre.

Her television work includes the BBC's Out of Hours in the late 1990s, and Murphy's Law with James Nesbitt. She has also appeared in Casualty and EastEnders (1992). In the latter, she played an escort named Debbie who was hired by Ian Beale. Rogers appeared as Paul Calf's former girlfriend Julie in Steve Coogan's Paul and Pauline Calf's Video Diary and as Juliet Bray in The Lakes. In 1996, she appeared in A Touch of Frost in an episode titled "The Things We Do for Love", playing a character called Vicky Philips.

In 2000, Rogers starred as Yvonne in the cult BBC Two drama series Attachments, working with David Walliams. She then went on to appear alongside Walliams in a number of sketches in the first three series of Little Britain.

Between January 2005 and August 2010, Rogers played DC/Sgt Jo Masters in The Bill. By the time the series ended, she was the longest-serving female on the series. She had previously appeared in The Bill in 1992 and 1994.

In one of her first roles after The Bill, Rogers appeared in Matt Lucas and David Walliams' follow-up to Little Britain, Come Fly with Me, which debuted on the BBC on Christmas Day 2010. She played FlyLo check-in desk manager Helen Baker.

In 2013, Rogers starred as nurse Helen Dolan in the second series of Kay Mellor's The Syndicate.

In 2015, Rogers starred in the CBBC children's programme The Dumping Ground, portraying Tee and Johnny's mum, Lucy.

In December 2016, she made another appearance in EastEnders, this time as a parking attendant named Karen Beckworth who convinces Lee Carter (Danny Hatchard) not to take his own life, in a two-episode stint.

In February 2020, Rogers recorded a three-part podcast interview with co-star Chris Simmons, who played DC Mickey Webb, in which they also discussed their collaboration on her debut play The Still Room. Between 2016 and 2020, Rogers appeared in a guest role as Jenny Gifford's (Fay Ripley) sister, Sheila, in Cold Feet.

== Personal life ==
Rogers gave birth to her first child in January 2006, and resumed filming The Bill again in August that year. Her character reappeared on screen on 19 December 2006. Rogers lives in Surrey with her son.
