= Stephen Aaron-Sipple =

English actor (born 1987)

- Born: Stephen Martin Sipple; December 1987 (age 38); Waltham Forest, Essex, England
- Occupation: Actor
- Years active: 2012–present
- Television: Oxen; EastEnders
- Children: 1

Stephen Martin Sipple (born December 1987), known professionally as Stephen Aaron-Sipple, is an English actor. He began his career appearing in an array of short films and portraying minor roles in television series including Cuckoo, The Outlaws and The Witcher. He appeared in the Danish crime drama Oxen from 2023 to 2025, before joining the BBC soap opera EastEnders as Mark Fowler in 2026.

== Early life ==
Aaron-Sipple was born Stephen Martin Sipple in December 1987 in Waltham Forest, London.

== Career ==
Sipple had various jobs and trained as a firefighter prior to acting, before studying at The International School Of Screen Acting. He went on to appear in short films including Light of the World (2012), Ring Ring (2014), Watch Over Me (2014) and Killer Bird (2015). In 2014, he appeared in the music video for the One Direction song "Night Changes".Aaron-Sipple has a daughter, born in 2015. His television credits include Cuckoo (2019), Glow & Darkness (2021), The Outlaws (2024), Silo (2025) and The Witcher (2025). He appeared in the web series Horizon as Cross in 2017, and the short film Liam in 2019, as well as playing a delivery driver in the BBC soap opera EastEnders in 2020. His film credits include Crying Wolf (2015), Creatures (2020), 57A (2020), Wolfshead (2021), Card Dead (2021), Cam Girls (2021) and Revolution X (2023). Between 2023 and 2025, he appeared in the Danish crime drama series Oxen as John Taylor. The drama subsequently began airing on Channel 4 from November 2024.

In January 2026, Aaron-Sipple appeared in EastEnders again in a flashforward episode set on New Year's Day 2027 in which he was simply credited as "Man". Later that month, it was announced he would be joining the cast, taking over the role of as Mark Fowler, last played by Ned Porteous ten years prior. Upon joining the soap, Aaron-Sipple said "Having grown up in East London, EastEnders has been in my life since childhood". He added that he was "excited to be joining not one, but two iconic Albert Square families and was looking forward to viewers seeing why Mark is back, and what Walford has in store for him."

== Filmography ==
Year	Title	Role	Notes
2012	Light of the World	2nd King	Short film
2014	Ring Ring	Martin	Short film
2014	Watch Over Me	Thug	Short film
2015	Killer Bird	Warren	Short film
2015	Cry Wolf 3D	Werewolf	Film
2017	Cute Little Buggers	Brian	Film
2017	The Holly Kane Experiment	Snatch Team	Film
2017	My Online Nightmare	Mark Twitchell	1 episode
2017, 2019	Horizon	Cross	Recurring role
2017	Apocalypse	Dave the Camereman	Film
2018	The First Detectives	Detective Williams	Film
2018	Could You Patent the Sun?	Henchman One	Short film
2019	Cuckoo	Tigran	Episode: "Ivy Arrives"
2019	Liam	Trevor	Short film
2019	The Road to Nowhere	Shaun	Short film
2019	Card Dead	Billy Seage	Short film
2020	One-way Glass	Tom	Short film
2020	57A	Jack	Short film
2020	EastEnders	Delivery Guy	Guest role
2021	Cam Girls	Steven	Short film
2021	Glow & Darkness	Gabriel	1 episode
2021	Wolfshead	Robin	Short film
2021	Creatures	Christopher Hall	Film
2022	Jungle	PC James	Episode: "Go. Going. Gone."
2022	Revolution X	Vex	Film
2023	Trust	Mikel Ivanov	Episode: "Trust: Renegade"
2023	Sky Monster	Karl	Film
2023–2025	Oxen	John Taylor	Recurring role
2024	The Outlaws	Rani's Lover	1 episode
2025	Silo	Supervising Raider Dan	Episode: "Into the Fire"
2025	The Witcher	General Gregor	Episode: "A Sermon of Survival"
2026–present	EastEnders	Mark Fowler	Regular role

=== Music videos ===
Year	Song	Artist	Ref.
2014	"Night Changes"	One Direction	
