= Totally Tom =

- Education: Eton College
- Notable work: Live at the Electric

Comedy career
- Years active: 2010–present
- Medium: Stand up, television
- Members: Tom Stourton; Tom Palmer

Totally Tom are a British comedy duo consisting of Tom Stourton and Tom Palmer.

== Background ==
Stourton and Palmer first met as housemates at Eton College. Their public school education became a major subject in their comedy and spoofs, focusing on the perceived "posh" stereotypes associated with those educated at British public schools.

After Eton, Stourton, the second son of former BBC journalist Edward Stourton, studied art history at the University of Bristol, while Palmer pursued history at the University of Oxford. They later reunited after university and decided to pursue comedy full-time.

== Career ==
Totally Tom first started performing together in 2010, conducting a UK university tour and launching their short online film High Renaissance Man.

During 2011 the duo performed at the Edinburgh Festival Fringe's Underbelly, in which they were nominated for the Best Newcomer Award. In the same year the also made their television debut on Channel 4's Comedy Lab.

The duo returned to the Edinburgh Fringe Festival in 2012, the same year, they appeared on BBC Three's Comedy Marathon.

From 2012 to 2014 the duo appeared as the backstage crew in the BBC Three stand-up/sketch series Live at the Electric.
