= Ned Porteous =

British actor (born 1994)

- Born: Edward Graham Porteous; 7 July 1994 (age 32); High Wycombe, Buckinghamshire, England
- Education: Guildford School of Acting
- Years active: 2015–present

Edward Graham Porteous (born 7 July 1994) is an English actor. He is known for his roles as Mark Fowler in the BBC soap opera EastEnders (2016) and Joe Tate in the ITV soap opera Emmerdale (2017–2018, 2024–present).

== Early life and education ==
Porteous is from Buckinghamshire. He enrolled at Tring Park School for the Performing Arts before going on to graduate with a Bachelor of Arts in Acting from Guildford School of Acting in 2015.

== Career ==
Porteous made his acting debut during an episode of the BBC medical drama Holby City as Rufus Lucas on 15 September 2015. He then featured in a 13 episode stint of the BBC soap opera EastEnders as Mark Fowler between 11 August and 9 September 2016. Despite Mark having been born and brought up in the United States, Porteous did not use an American accent for the role.

On 13 September 2017, he first appeared in the ITV soap opera Emmerdale as young businessman Tom Waterhouse, a name that turned out to be an alias, the character's real name being Joseph Tate. He received nominations at the National Television Awards and the British Soap Awards. Porteous exited Emmerdale in October 2018. That same year, he made his feature film debut in the horror film Astral.

Porteous played Lord Wetherby, Henry Granville's (Julian Ovenden) lover, in the first season of the 2020 Netflix period drama Bridgerton. Porteous subsequently portrayed Luke in the Disney+ series Extraordinary. In December 2024, Porteous reprised his role as Joe in Emmerdale. In 2025, he appeared in an episode of Grantchester as Harvey Baron.

== Filmography ==
| Year | Title | Role | Notes |
|---|---|---|---|
| 2015 | Holby City | Rufus Lucas | Episode: "Shockwaves" |
| 2016 | EastEnders | Mark Fowler | 13 episodes |
| 2016 | Suspects | Luke Drummond | Episode: "The Enemy Within: Part 6" |
| 2016 | Delicious | Will | Episode: "Episode 1" |
| 2017–2018, 2024–present | Emmerdale | Joe Tate | Regular role |
| 2018 | Astral | Ben Lawrence | |
| 2020 | Bridgerton | Lord Wetherby | 3 episodes |
| 2023 | Extraordinary | Luke | |
| 2023 | Doctor Who | Zogroth | Voice role |
| 2024 | Here We Go | Ugly Chris | 1 episode |
| 2025 | Grantchester | Harvey Baron | 1 episode |

== Awards and nominations ==
| Year | Ceremony | Category | Nominated work | Result | Ref. |
|---|---|---|---|---|---|
| 2018 | 23rd National Television Awards | Newcomer | Emmerdale | Nominated | |
| 2018 | British Soap Awards | Best On-Screen Partnership (with Andrew Scarborough) | Emmerdale | Nominated | |
| 2018 | Inside Soap Awards | Best Bad Boy | Emmerdale | Shortlisted | |
| 2018 | TV Choice Awards | Best Soap Newcomer | Emmerdale | Won | |
| 2019 | Inside Soap Awards | Best Exit | Emmerdale | Nominated | |
| 2025 | British Soap Awards | Villain of the Year | Emmerdale | Nominated | |
