= Danny Hatchard =

English actor (born 1991)

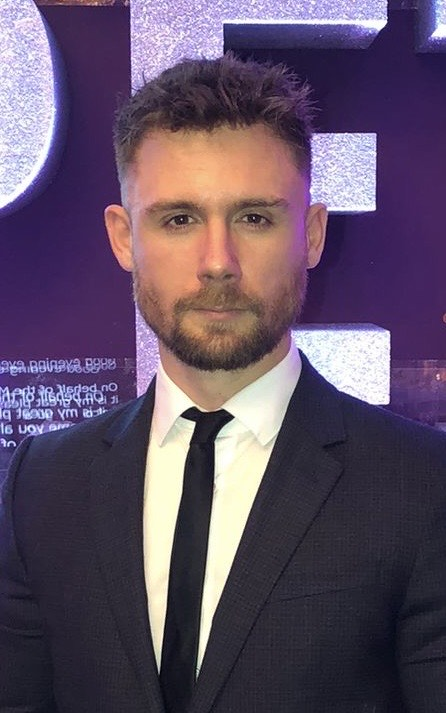
- Hatchard in 2021
- Born: Danny-Boy Hatchard; 26 July 1991 (age 35); London, United Kingdom
- Occupation: Actor
- Years active: 2006–present
- Television: EastEnders (2014–2017, 2019–2020, 2024, 2026); Our Girl (2020); Ridley Road (2021)

Danny-Boy Hatchard (born 26 July 1991) is a British actor from London, known for playing Lee Carter in the BBC soap opera EastEnders. Hatchard's other credits include Aaron in the 2014 film We Still Kill the Old Way and Steven Pierce in the 20th anniversary production of Beautiful Thing. In July 2019, it was announced that he will play Private Rhett Charlton in the fourth series of Our Girl.

== Career ==
On 21 January 2014, Hatchard was cast in the role of Lee Carter in the BBC soap opera EastEnders. He began filming his first scenes in February. It was announced in 2016 that Hatchard would leave EastEnders in 2017. He returned temporarily in late 2019 for a short stint, and again in December 2020. Hatchard once again reprised the role of Lee on 16 December 2024 for one episode. In 2020, Hatchard joined the cast of the BBC military drama Our Girl as Private Rhett Charlton, while he appeared as Lee in 2021's Ridley Road. In 2025, he appeared in series 4, episode 6 of Five's The Madame Blanc Mysteries as Jovan.

In August 2026 it was announced that Hatchard would be returning to EastEnders later that year for a short stint.
