= Denise Welch =

English actress and television personality (born 1958)

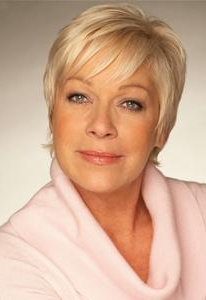
- Welch in 2011
- Born: Jacqueline Denise Welch; 22 May 1958 (age 68); Tynemouth, England
- Occupations: Actress; television personality; writer
- Years active: 1981–present
- Employers: ITV; BBC; Channel 4
- Spouses: David Easter (m. 1983; div. 1988) Tim Healy (m. 1988; div. 2012) Lincoln Townley (m. 2013)
- Children: 2, including Matty Healy

Jacqueline Denise Welch (born 22 May 1958) is an English actress, television personality, writer and broadcaster. Her roles include Natalie Barnes in the ITV soap opera Coronation Street (1997–2000), Steph Haydock in Waterloo Road (2006–2010, 2026), and Trish Minniver in Hollyoaks (2021–2022). Welch also appeared as a regular panellist on the ITV chat show Loose Women (2005–2013, 2018–2026).

Welch's other acting roles include the television dramas Spender (1991–1993), Soldier Soldier (1993–1995), and Down to Earth (2004–2005). In 2011, she was a contestant on the sixth series of Dancing on Ice, where she was partnered with professional skater Matt Evers. In 2012, Welch won the ninth series of Celebrity Big Brother.

== Early life ==
Jacqueline Denise Welch was born in Tynemouth on 22 May 1958 to a family of confectioners. She has a younger sister, Debbie. Welch attended Bygate School in Whitley Bay, and La Sagesse School in Newcastle upon Tyne, before moving to Ebchester, County Durham at the age of 13, where she attended Blackfyne Grammar School in Consett and passed five GCE exams. She developed a penchant for acting at the age of 14 after being cast in a school production of Finian's Rainbow. At the age of 17, she contemplated going to a teacher training college in Crewe; however, her father and her drama teacher suggested she apply for the Mountview Academy of Theatre Arts in London. Welch was successful in her application, and graduated in 1979, gaining her Equity card while teaching dance at the Watford Palace Theatre.

== Career ==
=== Acting ===
Welch became an actress straight after leaving school, aged 12. She was formally trained at Mountview Theatre School between 1976 and 1979.

She performed on stage in London in Yakkety-Yak with the McGann brothers at the Astoria Theatre in 1983, and later joined the Live Theatre Company, Newcastle, where she featured in many productions, including There's a Girl in My Soup, and an Alan Ayckbourn quartet of plays, including Bedroom Farce. She also played the role of Sandy in the musical Grease at the Haymarket Theatre, Leicester, in 1983.

Her first television appearance was in the Tyne Tees Television production Barriers in 1981. A few years later, she appeared in ITV's hit drama Auf Wiedersehen, Pet (1986), following this with roles in the children's television show Byker Grove (1990–1991), A Kind of Living (1988), the Catherine Cookson adaptation The Glass Virgin (1995), and appearing opposite Jimmy Nail in BBC's Spender (1991–1993).

In 1993, Welch became a household name when she was cast as Marsha Stubbs in ITV's drama series Soldier Soldier. Owing to her success in the series, she released a double-A side single in 1995, coupling "You Don't Have to Say You Love Me" (a cover of the Dusty Springfield hit) with "Cry Me a River" (a standard popularised by Julie London), which reached number 23 in the UK Singles Chart.

Welch gained even wider notability in 1997, when she was cast as Natalie Horrocks in the long-running ITV soap opera Coronation Street. Natalie was introduced as a divorcee who soon became the mistress of Kevin Webster (played by Michael Le Vell), the husband of Sally Webster. Kevin and Sally were one of the show's longest-running couples, and had two children. Originally portrayed as a femme fatale, Natalie rose to respectability by becoming landlady of the soap's famous public house, The Rovers Return. In 2000, the Coronation Street producers wanted Welch to perform a storyline involving Natalie having a miscarriage, but she refused, saying that the character had already lost her husband and son. However, Welch, who was expecting a baby the same year, decided to leave the serial. At the time, Welch commented, "I am looking forward to being a mum again and spending some time with my baby and am relishing the prospect of new challenges in my career." A spokesperson for Granada TV commented, "The character [Natalie] will be gone as she moves to somewhere new, we wish Denise well both for the birth of her baby and for her future career."

In 2002, Welch guest-starred in ITV's Where the Heart Is, and the BBC's hospital drama Holby City, playing risk manager Pam McGrath, who conducted an on-screen relationship with the character Mubbs Hussein (played by Ian Aspinall). She guest-starred twice in ITV's long-running police drama The Bill (in 1997 and 2006), and has also appeared in the BBC's Doctors (2004), Down to Earth (2004–2005) and Born and Bred (2002–2003). Welch starred (with second billing) in the British feature film The Jealous God (2005) and Hollyoaks: In the City (2006), amongst other appearances. From 2006 to 2010, she appeared as French teacher Steph Haydock in the successful BBC One school-based drama series Waterloo Road, and played Janet "Goldie" Gold in an episode called "Rogue" of the long-running medical drama series, Casualty, which aired on 2 July 2011.

Welch originally won the role of Frances Myers in Bad Girls, but ended up declining it owing to illness at the time; her future Waterloo Road co-star Eva Pope received the part instead. Welch left Waterloo Road without intending to return for Series six, but eventually decided to come back for episodes nine and ten. Welch is set to reprise her role of Steph Haydock for the Series 17 of Waterloo Road in 2026.

Via the BenidormTweets Twitter feed, it was revealed that Welch would have a part in Series 4 of Benidorm. She played the part of 'Scary' Mary, alongside her then-husband, Tim Healy. In the episode of Benidorm, she ends up engaging in a fight with Sheila Reid's Madge.

In 2010, along with other members of the show Loose Women, she performed Girls Aloud's hit song "The Promise" for Children in Need under the name Nanas Aloud. The performance helped contribute to the total sum that year of £18.2 million.

In 2012, Welch played Truvy in the touring production of Steel Magnolias. The following year, she played the part of Catherine Robinson in Richard Bean's Smack Family Robinson at the Rose Theatre in Kingston.

On 25 March 2016, it was announced that Welch would guest star in EastEnders as Alison Slater, the estranged mother of Kyle Slater (Riley Carter Millington) and secret stepmother of Stacey Slater (Lacey Turner). Of her casting, Welch stated: "I'm so thrilled to be part of such an iconic show; it's so exciting! I have several friends on the show and it's a great crowd so I can't wait to get started. It's a short stint but such a powerful role and I'm thrilled to be taking this on." Welch made her initial appearance as Alison on 3 May 2016, with fans praising her performance and insisting she was given a permanent role in the soap.

In 2017, Welch appeared as Valerie in the romantic comedy film Finding Fatimah. Welch starred in Black Eyed Susan, alongside son Louis, a short film which details Welch's own experience with depression. The film won the Best Drama Award at that year's Silicon Beach Film Awards.

In January 2018, it was announced that Welch would play Celia in the UK touring production of Calendar Girls: The Musical.

In May 2020, Welch appeared as Doll Belvedere in the online series Dun Breedin, written by and starring Julie Graham alongside Angela Griffin, Alison Newman, Tracy-Ann Oberman and Tamzin Outhwaite in leading roles. Due to the lockdown imposed because of the COVID-19 pandemic, Welch's scenes were filmed in her own home, and the series also starred her husband, Lincoln Townley, as Doll's husband Zoot.

In 2023, Welch played the late Queen Elizabeth II in Diana: The Musical.

=== Music ===
Owing to Welsh's success in the Soldier Soldier series, she released a double-A side single in 1995, coupling "You Don't Have to Say You Love Me" (a cover of the Dusty Springfield hit) with "Cry Me a River" (a standard popularised by Julie London), which reached number 23 in the UK Singles Chart.

On 23 November 2025, Welch released the single "Slayy Bells", a track she co-wrote, as a contender for that year's Christmas number one.

=== Presenting and personal appearances ===
Welch has presented numerous television shows, and also appeared in a series of SCS adverts promoting soft furnishings. She hosted her own DIY series The Real DIY Show in 2000 and Soap Fever for ITV2. In 2001, she appeared on Lily Savage's Blankety Blank. Since 2005, she has been a regular panellist on ITV's topical lunchtime chat show Loose Women. In 1999, she appeared as Petula Clark in ITV's celebrity singing contest Stars in Their Eyes.

She was the subject of This Is Your Life in 1999, when she was surprised by Michael Aspel at Piccadilly Station in Manchester.

In 2008, Welch appeared on a celebrity version of Who Wants to be a Millionaire along with Falklands War hero Simon Weston. In 2009, Welch took over as narrator of the revamped series of 10 Years Younger, for Channel 4. She also participated in Playing the Part, a documentary on BBC One on 21 May 2009, in which she went back to her old secondary school, Consett Community Sports College, and taught there for a week.

Welch shows her support for the children's charity, Children North East which is based in Newcastle, by making appearances at events and supporting community-based projects. In April 2010, Welch appeared with her husband Tim on ITV's All Star Mr & Mrs and donated their runner-up prize of £5,000 to Children North East. She has also appeared in the biannual benefit concert Sunday for Sammy, parodying the show Loose Women as "Slack Lasses".

Welch guest presented the ITV Breakfast programme Lorraine in November 2010. Beginning on 9 January 2011, Welch participated in the sixth series of Dancing on Ice on ITV with her skating partner, American professional ice skater Matt Evers, who partnered Zoe Salmon and Heather Mills in previous series. On the eighth week of the show, which was broadcast on 6 March 2011, she and Evers were the seventh couple to be voted out of the competition after losing the skate-off to army soldier, Johnson Beharry.

In January 2012, Welch was a housemate in Celebrity Big Brother on Channel 5 in the UK. She went on to win the series, beating Frankie Cocozza in the final.

In 2013, she participated in the ITV dancing show Stepping Out with husband Lincoln Townley.

It is believed that Welch "walked out" of Loose Women in October 2013 due to differences with the new director of ITV, Helen Warner. Welch returned to the show in June 2018.

She appeared on the 2013 Christmas special of Through the Keyhole, hosted by Keith Lemon.

In early September 2020, Welch appeared on This Morning claiming in her interview with Eamonn Holmes and Ruth Langsford that the media and the authorities are "fear-mongering" over the COVID-19 pandemic. She had a disagreement on Twitter with Piers Morgan over COVID-19 infection rates. Morgan called her "deluded" and "dangerous" after her appearance on This Morning.

== Personal life ==
Welch resides in Wilmslow, Cheshire. Her first marriage was to actor David Easter, lasting from 1983 until their divorce in 1988; Welch has since gone public with her belief that he committed adultery. Welch met Tim Healy while they were working together for Newcastle's Live Theatre Company. They married in Haringey, London, on 18 October 1988 and have two sons: Matty Healy (b. 8 April 1989, Hendon, London), who is a member of the alternative rock band The 1975, and Louis Vincent (b. 2 March 2001, Salford), who is an actor.

Welch announced, live on Loose Women on 6 February 2012, that she and Healy were separated and that they had been for a long time. Shortly after that, Welch announced that she was dating her PR manager, Lincoln Townley. In August 2012, it was revealed that she and Townley were engaged. On 13 July 2013, they married at the Vale do Lobo resort, near Almancil, on the Algarve in Portugal.

Welch said that her marriage was nearly ruined because of her mental illness, as well as an affair she had during her depression. With the help of her former Coronation Street co-star Kevin Kennedy, she attended Alcoholics Anonymous and suggests this helped her end her dependency on alcohol. In April 2010, her 320-page autobiography Pulling Myself Together was published, in which she describes how she overcame her problems with alcohol, drugs and depression.

In a February 2015 interview, she said that she felt "freer from my mental health issues in my 50s than I did in my 30s and 40s".

== Filmography ==
Film
Year	Title	Role	Notes
2005	The Jealous God	Maureen	Supporting role
2008	Sunday for Sammy	Slack Lass	Supporting role
2009	A Bit of Tom Jones?	Delilah	Supporting role
2013	It’s a Lot	Ms. Anne	Supporting role
2017	Finding Fatimah	Valerie	Main role
2017	Black Eyed Susan	The Woman	Short film
2019	Burning Men	Julie	Supporting role
2020	Love Sarah	Elizabeth	Main role

Television
Year	Title	Role	Notes
1982	Barriers	Janet Tompkinson	Series 2: Episode 4
1986	Auf Wiedersehen, Pet	Jean	Episode: "Marjorie Doesn't Live Here Anymore"
1988	A Kind of Living	Jane	Series 2: Episode 6
1989	And a Nightingale Sang	Girl at Dance	Television film
1990–1991	Byker Grove	Polly Bell	Recurring role; 7 episodes
1991	New Voices	Unknown	Episode: "The Godmother"
1991–1993	Spender	Frances Spender	Main role; 14 episodes
1993	Harry	Valerie	Series 1: Episode 4
1993	Come Snow, Come Blow	Unknown	Television film
1993–1995	Soldier Soldier	Marsha Stubbs	Main role; 26 episodes
1995	The Glass Virgin	Jessie	Miniseries; 2 episodes
1997	The Bill	Sheila Hayman	Episode: "Breaking Up"
1997	See You Friday	Vanessa	All 6 episodes
1997–2000	Coronation Street	Natalie Barnes	Regular role; 489 episodes
2002	The Vice	Clara King	Episode: "No Man's Land"
2002	Breeze Block	Policewoman	Episode: "Saturday, Sinday"
2002	Holby City	Pam McGrath	Recurring role; 5 episodes
2002	Where the Heart Is	Linda Sargent	Episode: "Extra Time"
2002–2003	Born and Bred	Edie McClure	Episodes: "Nothing Like the Son" and "Fertility Rites"
2003	The Afternoon Play	Carol Haye	Episode: "Turkish Delight"
2004	Doctors	Jane Howard	Episodes: "Two Can Play: Parts 1 & 2"
2004–2005	Down to Earth	Jackie Murphy	Main role; 18 episodes
2006	The Bill	Elaine Wallace	Episode: "Better the Devil You Know"
2006	Hollyoaks: In the City	DCI Fisher	2 episodes
2006–2010, 2026	Waterloo Road	Steph Haydock	Regular role; 79 episodes
2011	Benidorm	Scary Mary	Series 4: Episode 1
2011	Casualty	Janet "Goldie" Gold	Episode: "Rogue"
2011	Bloody Norah	Mum	Television film
2012	Loserville	Susan Lewis	Television film
2015	Doctors	Judith Whitney	Episode: "Oh What a Tangled Web..."
2015	Inspector George Gently	Susan	Episode: "Gently with the Women"
2015–2016	Boy Meets Girl	Pam McDonald	All 12 episodes
2015–2016	Holby City	Linda Bradshaw	Episodes: "Cover Story" and "A Friend in Need"
2016	EastEnders	Alison Slater	Episode 5276
2016	Doctors	Denise Brown	Episode: "A Christmas Treat"
2018	Different for Girls	Maeve	Episode: "The whole story"
2020	Class Dismissed	Pam Travers	Episodes: "Snake!" and "Key Stage 3 Rules"
2020	Dun Breedin	Doll Belvedere	Online series; all 9 webisodes
2021–2022	Hollyoaks	Trish Minniver	Regular role; 95 episodes
2022	Dead Canny	Angela	Episode: "Pilot"
2024	Emmerdale	Heidi	Guest role; 3 episodes
2026	Tip Toe	Diane Vazey	Episode: #1.3
2026	Benidorm Is Murder	Ziggy	Episode: "Die Laughing"
2026	Forever Home	Moira Crottie	Six-part drama

As herself
Year	Title	Role	Notes
1999	Celebrity Stars in Their Eyes	Herself	Contestant
1999	Soap Fever	Herself	Presenter
2000	The Real DIY Show	Herself	Presenter
2000–2002, 2005–2013, 2018–2026	Loose Women	Regular panellist	Guest (2000); Guest panellist (2001–2002); Relief presenter (2006–2010, 2012, 2024)
2008	Who Wants to be a Millionaire	Herself	Contestant
2009	10 Years Younger	Herself	Narrator
2009	Playing the Part	Herself	Participant
2010	All Star Mr & Mrs	Herself	Contestant
2010	Lorraine	Herself	Guest presenter
2011	Dancing on Ice	Herself	Contestant
2012	Celebrity Big Brother	Housemate	Winner
2012	Piers Morgan's Life Stories	Herself	Guest
2012	The Chase: Celebrity Special	Herself	Contestant
2013	Tipping Point: Lucky Stars	Herself	Contestant
2013	Stepping Out	Herself	Contestant
2013	Through the Christmas Keyhole	Herself	Celebrity Homeowner
2013	The Cube: Celebrity Special	Herself	Contestant

== Theatre credits ==
Year	Title	Role	Notes
1983	Yakkety-Yak	Rita	Astoria Theatre
1984	Grease	Sandy	Haymarket Theatre
1984	Gas Light	Bella Manningham	Nightingale Theatre, Brighton
1985	There's a Girl in My Soup	Claire	Live Theatre, Newcastle
1986	Bedroom Farce	Delia	Live Theatre, Newcastle
1995	Shooting the Legend	Various	Theatre Royal, Newcastle
2001–2002	Jack and the Beanstalk	Fairy	Theatre Royal, Newcastle
2004	The Rise and Fall of Little Voice	Mari	Royal Exchange, Manchester
2004–2005	Snow White and the Seven Dwarfs	Wicked Queen	Stockport Plaza
2006–2007	Cinderella	Fairy	Darlington Civic
2012	Steel Magnolias	Truvy	UK Tour
2012–2013	Cinderella	Fairy	Royal & Derngate, Northampton
2013	Smack Family Robinson	Catherine Robinson	Rose Theatre Kingston
2015	The Ancient Secret of Youth and the Five Tibetans	Penny	Octagon Theatre, Bolton
2017	The Wind in the Willows	Mrs Otter	London Palladium
2017–2018	Jack and the Beanstalk	Fairy	Times Square, Newcastle
2018–2019	Calendar Girls	Celia	UK tour
2023	Diana: The Musical	Queen Elizabeth II	Hammersmith Apollo
2024	The Gap	Corral	Hope Mill Theatre

== Written works ==
=== Memoirs ===
- Pulling Myself Together (Pan, 2010) ISBN 9780330513012
- Starting Over (Pan, 2012) ISBN 9781447222484
- The Unwelcome Visitor (Hodder and Stoughton, 2020) ISBN 9780330513012

=== Novels ===
- If They Could See Me Now (Sphere, 2016) ISBN 9780751562323
- The Mother's Bond (Sphere, 2018) ISBN 9780751562378

== See also ==
- List of Celebrity Big Brother (British TV series) housemates
- List of Dancing on Ice contestants

Preceded by Paddy Doherty	Celebrity Big Brother UK Winner; Series 9 (2012)	Succeeded by Julian Clary
