= Episode 5276 =

- EastEnders episode
- Alison Slater meets her transgender son Kyle Slater and Stacey Branning.
- Episode no.: Episode 5276
- Directed by: Sophie Lifschutz
- Written by: Daran Little
- Original air date: 3 May 2016
- Running time: 30 minutes

Episode chronology
← Previous; Episode 5275	Next → Episode 5277

Episode 5276 of the BBC soap opera EastEnders was broadcast in the United Kingdom on BBC One on 3 May 2016, between 7:30 pm and 8:00 pm. It was written by Daran Little, directed by Sophie Lifschutz, and executively produced by Dominic Treadwell-Collins. The episode features the only appearance of the character Alison Slater, played by Denise Welch. The episode focuses on Alison meeting her transgender son Kyle Slater (Riley Carter Millington) for the first time since he transitioned from female to male, though Alison ultimately rejects her son. It also includes a "heartbreaking" scene between Sonia Fowler (Natalie Cassidy) and Dot Branning (June Brown) about the possibility of Sonia having breast cancer, which was praised as "fantastic" by Inside Soap. The episode received a total viewership of 7,250,000 in the United Kingdom.

== Plot ==
Kyle Slater (Riley Carter Millington) is happy that his mother Alison Slater (Denise Welch) is visiting him, as he never thought she would want to see him since he transitioned from female to male. Kyle's half-sister Stacey Branning (Lacey Turner) has a video chat with her fiancé, Martin Fowler (James Bye), who sees Andy Flynn (Jack Derges) in the background wearing only a towel; Stacey lies that his boiler has broken (Stacey has actually discovered that Andy is homeless in episode 5273). Kyle leaves before Alison arrives, so Stacey lets her in. Their meeting is a little awkward, as Alison was in a bigamous marriage with Stacey's father, Brian Slater, and he had two families, though neither knew about the other until after Brian's death. Alison insists she thought Brian was single when she met him and found out only four months after he died. Stacey and Alison agree to be civil for Kyle's sake, but when Stacey says Kyle has missed his mother, she says she came to see her daughter, Sarah.

Kyle arrives with flowers for Alison, and she says he looks nothing like Sarah. She struggles with the meeting, insisting that she has only daughters and Sarah was beautiful. Kyle says he did not feel beautiful; he felt wrong, but now he does not. Alison says something is wrong with Kyle; he says he was born in the wrong body. Alison refuses to accept it; she had only just came to terms with Sarah being a lesbian when he announced he was transgender. Alison says it is not normal, and Stacey fails to convince her to get to know Kyle, telling her not to take Brian's actions out on Kyle. Alison says she is unable to build a relationship with Kyle, though wishes she could. She wishes him a happy life, but says he is not her Sarah. She takes Kyle's flowers, says she is glad he is not on his own, and leaves. Outside, she cries. Kyle is upset with Stacey for inviting Alison, saying he knew she would not accept him and now any hope he had has gone. Stacey says there will be another chance and apologises. Martin then returns from working away and shows Stacey the cash he has earned. When she says it does not look like much, he says there is more to come. He then tells Andy to shower somewhere else in future, and Andy says he knows Martin was fired from the job and is lying to Stacey.

Sonia Fowler (Natalie Cassidy) prepares to visit a doctor after finding a lump in her breast. She is accompanied by her girlfriend Tina Carter (Luisa Bradshaw-White), and the doctor refers Sonia for further tests. Back at home, Sonia tells her step-grandmother Dot Branning (June Brown) that she could have cancer and cries in Dot's arms. She admits she is also worried that Tina will no longer love her if she loses her breasts. Dot tells her to be strong and fight it. Sonia then tells Tina that she will have a double mastectomy, regardless of the results.

Masood Ahmed (Nitin Ganatra) admits to Carmel Kazemi (Bonnie Langford) that the date he had the night before was a scam and he was mugged. She tells him that he is charming and he will find someone genuine. Masood later buys her chocolates but she tells Denise Fox (Diane Parish) in front of Masood that her son Shakil Kazemi (Shaheen Jafargholi) has told her that he overheard her former husband Umar (Selva Rasalingam) saying he regrets leaving her and wants to reunite.

== Cast and characters ==
- Natalie Cassidy as Sonia Fowler
- Luisa Bradshaw-White as Tina Carter
- Jasmine Armfield as Bex Fowler
- Nitin Ganatra as Masood Ahmed
- Bonnie Langford as Carmel Kazemi
- Diane Parish as Denise Fox
- Danny Dyer as Mick Carter
- Kellie Bright as Linda Carter
- June Brown as Dot Branning
- Lacey Turner as Stacey Branning
- James Bye as Martin Fowler
- Riley Carter Millington as Kyle Slater
- Jack Derges as Andy Flynn
- Arian Chikhlia as Kamil Masood
- Denise Welch as Alison Slater
- Rachel Bavidge as Dr. Natasha Black
- Clive Hayward as Marc Zuccaroli

== Background ==
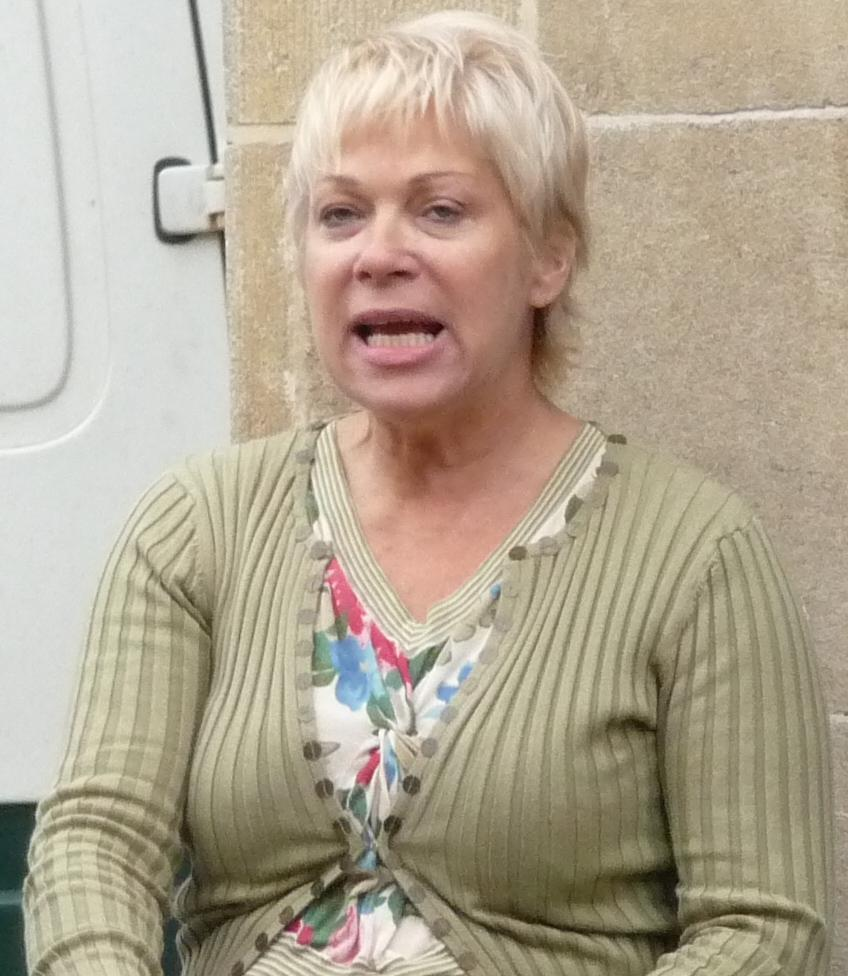
Denise Welch (pictured) was cast as Alison Slater for the episode, but dyed her hair brown for the role.

The episode was written by Daran Little, directed by Sophie Lifschutz, and executively produced by Dominic Treadwell-Collins. Denise Welch was cast as Alison Slater for a one-episode stint. Her casting was announced on 24 March 2016. Welch said of her casting, "It's a short stint but such a powerful role and I'm thrilled to be taking it on." Alison is the mother of transgender character Kyle Slater (Riley Carter Millington), though they have not seen each other since Kyle's transition from female to male. An EastEnders source said, "Alison is finding it difficult to accept her daughter is now her son and the storyline will follow her meeting Kyle for the first time. It will deal with very sensitive issues." Welsh had previously played the mother of a character who was dating a transgender character in Boy Meets Girl, so was "fascinated" about the EastEnders role, which she said "represents a different attitude" to her Boy Meets Girl character. She said she was "very proud and honoured to now be part of this storyline in EastEnders" and found filming on the Albert Square set "bizarre" and "exciting" because she had been watching EastEnders for many years. Welsh said the episode was a "wonderful episode, brilliantly written by Daran Little" and said that her part in it is "a storyline that happens very quickly. This has got a beginning, a middle and an end in this episode". Welch's hair was dyed brown for the episode, which Welch said was because she wanted "a change" and she did not want to wear a wig, and she spent an hour in the make-up department in preparation for filming the episode.

Welch said her scenes are "dramatic" and "upsetting", and explained that the reasons for Alison's arrival are because Kyle's half-sister Stacey is "a little bit worried about him" and "can see how much he needs his family so makes the decision to call Alison. Alison hasn't seen Kyle since he transitioned, and she's never met Stacey so this is a massive deal for all of them." She added that the meeting is "awkward" for everyone involved, due to Kyle's transition and Alison being the woman that Stacey's father was bigamously married to, but explained that "Alison is straight to the point and jumps right in and talks to Stacey about it. I think they both know deep down it's neither of their faults, but that doesn't stop the uncomfortableness of it all!" Welch said the meeting is "very difficult" between Alison and Kyle, as well as "very emotional" and "brief". Speaking of Alison's reunion with her estranged son, Welch said, "They're still mother and child, and Kyle needs his mum" and added, "I think he's hopeful Alison will return and open her arms to Kyle but it's just not as simple as that. I don't think Alison really knows what to expect. She knows what's happened and the choices Kyle has made, but when Alison last saw him, he was Sarah. I think she's very nervous about seeing him. This is a big deal for both of them." David Brown from Radio Times said that Kyle "will be thrown into a tailspin" by Alison's arrival, and that "tensions are running high" between them. Adam Miller from the Daily Express said that Alison's arrival causes "havoc" in the show, while Lucia Binding from the International Business Times said Alison's arrival would be "controversial" and Deepika Rajani from OK! said that the reunion between Alison and Kyle would not be a "heartwarming" one. Inside Soap said Alison's arrival was "set to cause fireworks" and Danny Walker from the Daily Mirror said that Kyle's past "will come back to haunt him" with Alison's arrival. Welsh appeared on This Morning to promote the episode.

The scenes involving Sonia, Tina and Dot are part of a wider storyline in which Sonia discovers she is carrying a mutated BRCA2 gene, inherited from her mother, Carol Jackson (Lindsey Coulson), putting her at a higher risk of breast cancer, and follow on from scenes in the previous episode where Sonia discovers Tina has cheated on her with Kyle's friend, Sophie Dodd (Poppy Rush). An EastEnders source said, "Tina is being amazing [in supporting Sonia], but Sonia needs another shoulder to cry on." Of the scenes between Sonia and Dot, the source said, "Together they talk about how worried [Sonia] is, and how she fears this anxiety will never end. Even if the lump isn't cancer, she's still carrying the BRCA2 gene and could get it at any time. The fear is overwhelming and Sonia doesn't know how to cope with it. She's got some major decisions to make." Carl Greenwood from the Daily Mirror said that "Although [Carol] beat the disease, Sonia is understandably at her wits' end with worry about her own fate and turns to Dot Branning (June Brown) to help her through it."

On Carmel's scenes in the episode, Kate White from Inside Soap reported that Carmel has a "big shock" when Shakil tells her that her former husband wants her back, as Carmel has "spent a long time coming to terms with Umar's decision to leave her for another woman, and the pain of their separation remains hard to bear", and said that "Carmel is stunned to hear of his romantic intentions." An EastEnders source said that Carmel "found it hard to let him go, even as Umar didn't seem to give her a second thought." The scenes in this episode set up scenes for the following episode where Carmel prepares to meet Umar. Although Shakil does not appear in this episode, the scenes also lead to his introduction in the following episode, which reveals that Shakil has lied in this episode. On Carmel's relationship with Masood, White said that Carmel is "smarting over seeing former lover Masood enjoying a date with another woman at the pub" because "there was a time when Carmel believed Masood could be her future". On Martin and Andy's scenes, Inside Soap reported that Martin's firing is "a bitter blow" as he has "been struggling to make the rent" and has "added pressure of his upcoming wedding". They said that Stacey does not realise Martin has lost his job "mainly because he's still bringing some money to the table". Andy works out that Martin has lost his job in the episode, and the scenes are a lead-up to the following episodes, where Andy tells Stacey that Martin has lost his job and Martin confesses to Stacey when she confronts him.

== Reception ==
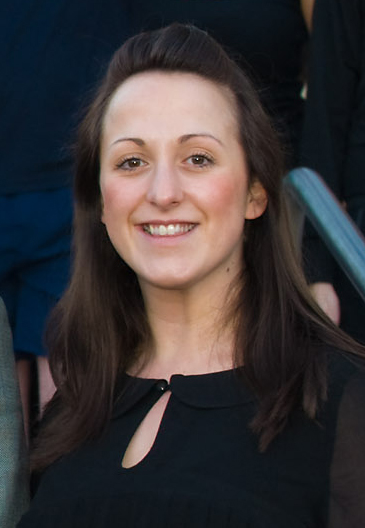
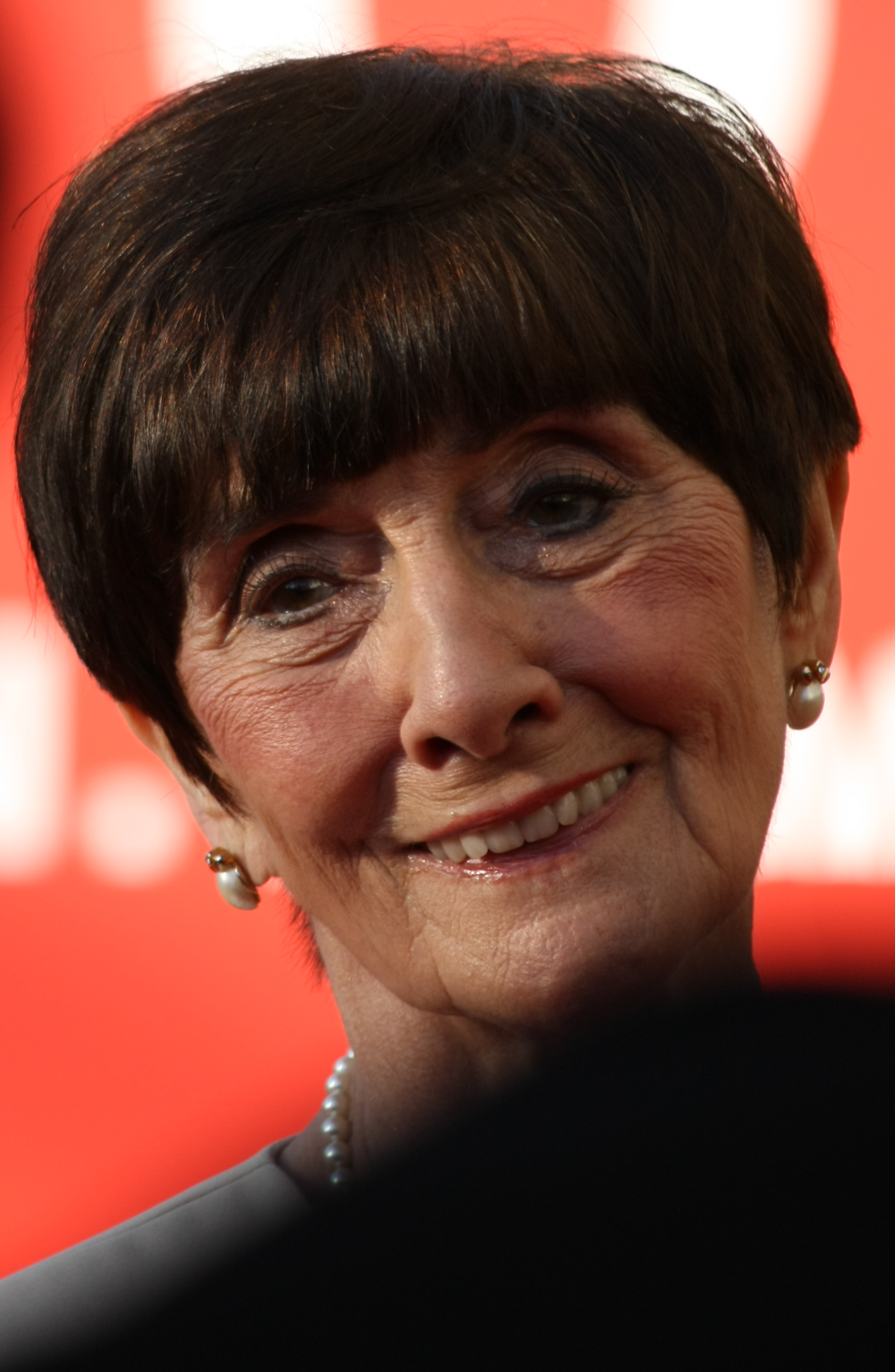
A scene between Natalie Cassidy (left) and June Brown (right) was praised as "heartbreaking" and "fantastic".

After seven days of the episode being shown on BBC One, it had been watched by 7.04 million people, including streaming through BBC iPlayer, and after 28 days, the number had risen to 7.147 million. It was the second most-watched TV episode of the week, after Britain's Got Talent on ITV. A same-day repeat of the episode on W was watched by 100,000 people within seven days and 103,000 people within 28 days. This gave the episode a total viewership of 7.25 million. Ultimately, it was the 71st most watched episode of EastEnders in 2016, out of 210 episodes.

Digital Spy polled its readers on what they thought would be the best soap storyline in the upcoming week of 2 May 2016 out of a choice of five. Welch's guest appearance as Alison was voted first with 37%, compared to storylines from Hollyoaks (29%), Emmerdale (18%), Coronation Street (11%) and Doctors (5%). Welch's performance in the episode was praised by viewers on social media, with some viewers calling for Welsh to be given a more permanent role in the show following what some viewers called a "flawless" and "powerful" performance.

Daniel Kilkelly from Digital Spy said the scenes of Alison rejecting Kyle were "heartbreaking" and "tear-jerking", and "packed a real emotional punch". Neela Debnath from the Daily Express opined that Alison is "transphobic" in the episode. Ian Sandwell from Digital Spy said the scene where Sonia confides in Dot is "heartbreaking", while Inside Soap called it a "fantastic scene", adding that "Natalie Cassidy and June Brown are just brilliant together." Laura-Jayne Tyler from the same publication praised Welch's performance, writing "This wasn't just your run-of-the-mill EastEnders guest appearance. Denise Welch really earned her fee. More please!"
