= Portia Clark =

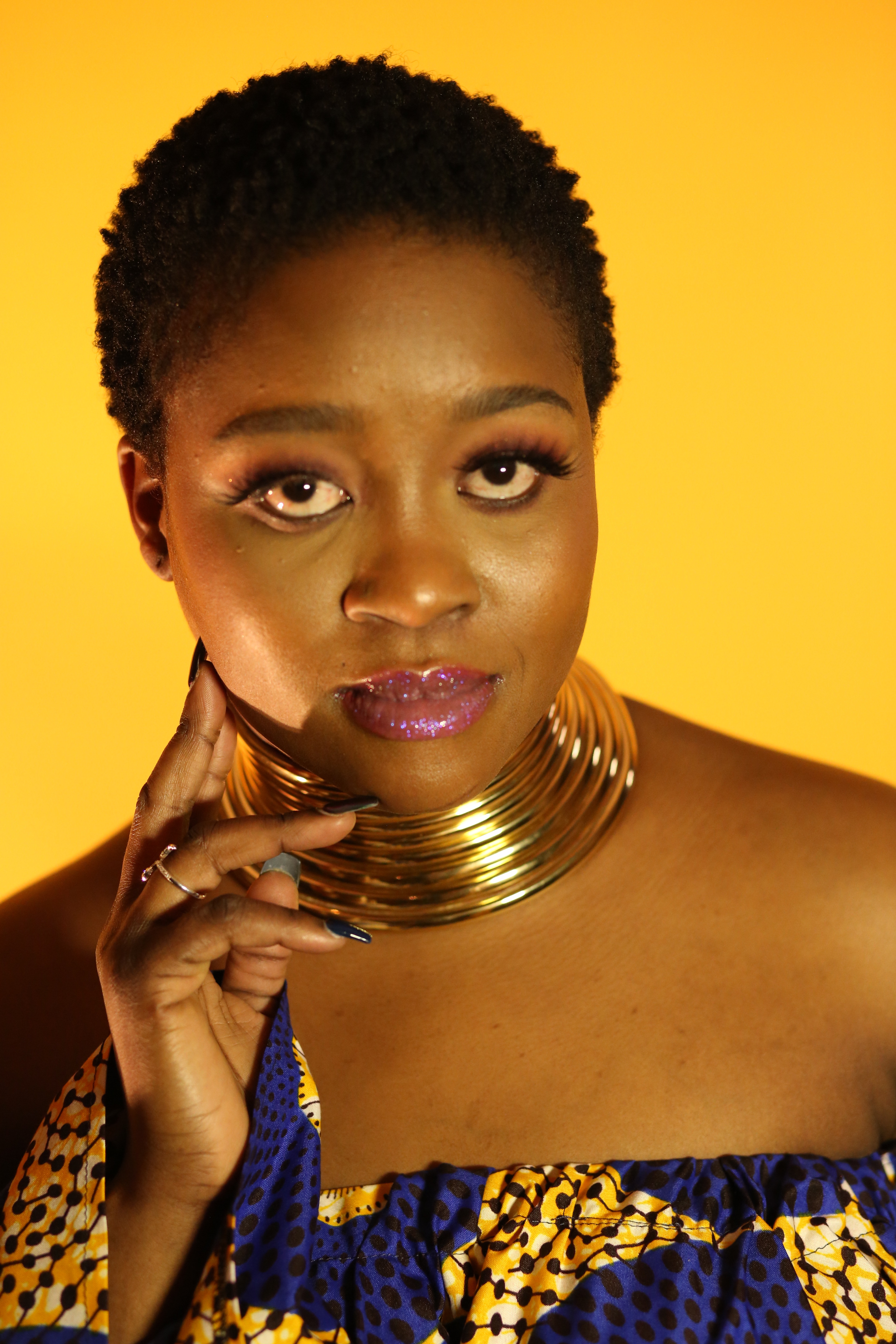
- Portia Clark

Background information
- Born: Portia Thanjekwayo; 11 July 1990 (age 36); Lusaka, Zambia
- Origin: Australia
- Genres: country soul; country music; pop music
- Occupation: Singer-songwriter
- Years active: 2014 –present
- Label: Venice Music
- Website: www.portiaclarkmusic.com

Portia Clark (born 11 July 1990) is a Zambian-born country soul, pop singer and songwriter.

== Biography ==
Portia was born in Lusaka, Zambia in 1990. Her father was a member of a South African anti-apartheid movement and was killed under unclear circumstances when she was one year old. A Zambian born Portia Thanjekwayo grew up in Lusaka, the capital and largest city of Zambia.

She started singing when she was just 8 years of age at Temple of Power Church in Livingstone, Zambia. She then joined vessels of praise at Capitol Christian Worship Centre in Lusaka at the age of 11. Her music was a dream. She dreamed singing in front of the President and many people. Lacking means to afford everyday essentials and transportation, Portia and her family walked miles at a time to attend church and school, and often went without food. She was inspired by many and believed in herself.

Determined to find an alternate creative outlet, Portia took to the streets to explore the Zambian nightlife. She discovered a boy band that held a residency at a local bar—the Vegas Lounge—and attended their nightly show time-after-time sharing her desire and plea to sing with them.

She is a Christian.

Clark was 'discovered' by her now husband Brendan Clark, the founder of charity Health Hope Zambia, in 2013 and has since migrated to Australia to progress her music career as a country soul singer and became an Australian citizen in 2021.

In 2014, she released her debut single "Hope" which she co wrote with Zambian Gospel artist Mutamula Mwale.

She nominated for best Zambian representative at the Born and Bred video awards.

Portia and Brendan Clark were married In 2017 at a ceremony officiated by Gene Simmons of KISS.

In 2019, Clark recorded her debut album in Nashville Tennessee, which features Darius Rucker.

Clark is currently the Zambian Ambassador for Health Hope Zambia which is an organisation that works to reduce the mortality rate at Zambia's largest malnutrition facility.

In February 2026, Portia Clark and her husband Brendan were involved in a public dispute after allegations surfaced that their 72 foot yacht Enigma was speeding through Perth's Swan River. The incident allegedly generated large waves that damaged moored vessels, jetties, and snapped piles across multiple local yacht clubs. The Clarks faced scrutiny from the Perth Flying Squadron Yacht Club regarding speed limit complaints. In response, he took legal action against the club in the Supreme Court of Western Australia, alleging the unauthorised release of CCTV footage of his vessel however Justice Craig Bydder dismissed the pre-action discovery application in August 2026 due to a lack of objective evidence supporting the claim.

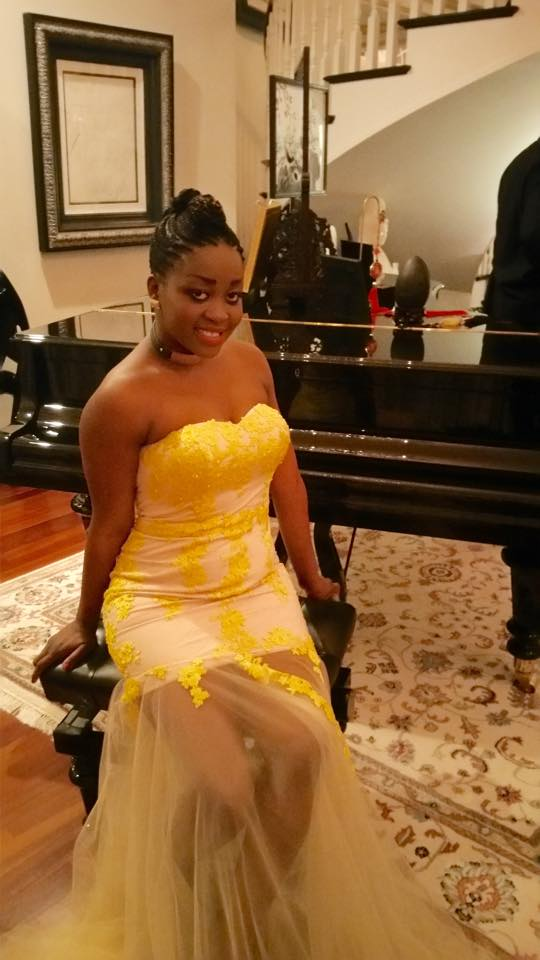
Clark in 2015

== Sources ==
- "Portia Clark launches song of Hope".
- "Portia Clark performs with Curtis Young".
- "Portia Clark journey from Zambian Shack to Perth Penthouse".
- "Portia Clark spotted in Minneapolis with all these celebrities".
- "Portia Clark marries Perth millionaire Brendan Clark with the legendary Gene Simmons as their marriage celebrant".
- "KISS Rocker signs on as fan of WA Charity chief =".
