= Kyle Slater =

Fictional EastEnders character

- EastEnders character
- Portrayed by: Riley Carter Millington
- Duration: 2015–16
- First appearance: Episode 5164/65; 30 October 2015
- Last appearance: Episode 5391; 25 November 2016
- Created by: Dominic Treadwell-Collins
- Introduced by: Dominic Treadwell-Collins
In-universe information
- Occupation: Chef
- Family: Slater
- Father: Brian Slater
- Mother: Alison Slater
- Stepmother: Jean Slater
- Sisters: Siobhan Slater; Shannon Slater
- Half-brothers: Sean Slater
- Half-sisters: Stacey Slater
- Grandmothers: Violet Slater
- Nephews: Arthur Fowler
- Nieces: Lily Slater; Hope Fowler
- First cousins: Hayley Slater
- Other relatives: Charlie Slater; Lynne Hobbs; Kat Slater; Belinda Peacock; Little Mo Mitchell; Zoe Slater; Charli Slater

Kyle Slater is a fictional character from the BBC soap opera EastEnders, played by Riley Carter Millington. He made his first appearance on 30 October 2015. EastEnders executive producer Dominic Treadwell-Collins had previously announced in February of that year that he wanted to cast a transgender actor to play a transgender character on the soap. When Millington heard this, he wrote to EastEnders telling them about his acting and transition. He was then invited to audition for the role and received the part, with Treadwell-Collins revealing that he had believed that Millington was right for the role since his first audition. Millington's casting was announced in October 2015. Millington was happy to be cast in the role and initially signed a six-month contract, which was later doubled.

Kyle was characterised as being fresh, relatable and having a big heart. He was introduced as the mysterious man who Stacey Slater (Lacey Turner) initially believes is stalking her and was part of the mystery surrounding a key. It is later revealed that Kyle is Stacey's half-brother, as her father, Brian Slater, had a secret family. Stacey's family struggle to believe Kyle's claim due to the belief that Brian did not have another son, and Kyle is blamed for Stacey's mental health issues, which leads Kyle to reveal that he is transgender and was originally called Sarah. Stacey is accepting of Kyle and they bond, with Kyle moving into her house. Kyle gets a job as a chef and briefly has a feud with Andy Flynn (Jack Derges). Producers cast Denise Welch as Alison Slater, Kyle's mother, for an emotional episode where Alison tells her son that she cannot accept his gender identity. Another storyline saw Kyle confront Steven Beale (Aaron Sidwell) after discovering that he robbed his own restaurant. In September 2016, it was announced that Kyle would be one of several characters to depart the soap and Millington made his last appearance on 25 November of that year.

The announcement of Millington's casting received praise from critics and viewers, including transgender journalist Paris Lees, who called it the biggest thing to happen for the transgender community that decade. The casting of a transgender actor as a transgender character made EastEnders history and prompted Hollyoaks to announce their own casting of a transgender actress less than a day later. However, one newspaper reported the news of Kyle's character in a mocking tone, which was criticised by politician and former EastEnders actor Michael Cashman. Kyle's character received praise and Millington was nominated for several awards, including Best Newcomer at the 2016 TV Choice awards. The scenes where Kyle is rejected by his mother were considered emotional and praised by critics. Millington praised fans for their positive support and revealed that Kyle's storyline with Alison had managed to reconcile a viewer with her transgender son. Kyle's departure was criticised by fans and critics, with Millington himself expressing disappointment at the way that Kyle did not have further development after he came out as trans.

== Casting and creation ==
In February 2015, EastEnders executive producer Dominic Treadwell-Collins announced at National Student Pride that EastEnders was looking to cast a transgender actor for a "transgender storyline". He explained that he wanted to do research on the subject in order to tell the story "properly", which he said he "always" likes to do for the soap. At the time of his announcement, rival soap operas Coronation Street and Hollyoaks had had transgender characters played by non-transgender actors. Treadwell-Collins spoke about wanting to cast a transgender actor, explaining, "you have to cast a trans actor, but you also don't want to mess up the story because EastEnders reaches so many people and a lot of our audience are quite traditional. The power of EastEnders is we can change the world a little. You can change it gently and influence people who would be maybe quite bigoted". EastEnders worked with groups in the transgender community and held workshops to find an actor for the role before creating and developing the character.

On 9 October of that year, it was announced that 21-year-old transgender actor Riley Carter Millington had been cast in the role of Kyle. It was Carter Millington's first acting role, and he was excited to be joining the soap, saying, "I can honestly say that I have now fulfilled my two biggest dreams - to be living my life as a man and to be an actor". He added that he could not wait to "get stuck in with filming" and was looking forward to what was in store for Kyle. Not much was revealed about the character, but it was reported that he would move in briefly later that month and then be a "new permanent resident" by the end of 2015. It was also revealed that Kyle has "secrets" and would be " thrown right into one of [the soap's] biggest stories". Speaking of the casting, Treadwell-Collins revealed that he made sure to cast the right actor for the role after being very moved by the life stories of the transgender actors who auditioned. He explained, "The people we met showed us a strength and bravery that took our breath away. To go through as much as they have while maintaining humour and a positive view on the world is testament to what special people we met". He also believed that EastEnders was well-known for "pushing boundaries with stories", such as the HIV diagnosis of Mark Fowler (Todd Carty) and the first gay kiss on a British soap opera, adding that the soap has "always led the way in changing audience perceptions about 'difference'". He believed that it was the "duty" big shows like EastEnders to tell stories about transgender people, saying, "I think people aren't as forward-thinking as we'd like to think they are. The more we can show the trans community on the television, the more people will understand."

"Kyle is a good Blackpool lad with a heart of gold. He's an optimist who brings out the best in others and is someone to depend on for solid advice. Kyle may not be the first on the dancefloor at a party but he is the person folk gravitate to for deep and meaningful chats in the kitchen at 2am."

— The BBC on Kyle's personality

Treadwell-Collins revealed that the EastEnders story team had worked with Millington to make Kyle "fresh and relatable" and hoped that fans would quickly take him "to their hearts". The producer also stressed that casting Millington was not an act of tokenism, calling the actor an "inspirational young man whose warmth immediately comes through the screen" in addition to a "talented" actor. EastEnders casting a transgender actor to play a transgender character made British soap opera history, and EastEnders bosses described it as a landmark moment. One of Millington's former tutors at Eccles College told Manchester Evening News that she always knew that Millington was "very talented" and would succeed, adding, "Everyone one at Eccles Sixth Form Centre is very proud of him". Days after the announcement, Millington was pictured filming with Lacey Turner, who portrays Stacey Slater, in what was thought to be a Christmas episode, which suggested that Kyle and Stacey would strike up a friendship. Millington initially signed a six month contract, and this was later extended to twelve. Kyle made his appearance on 30 October 2015. Kyle's official BBC profile called Kyle a "big-hearted optimist finding his way in the world", and questioned whether Walford would force him to "toughen up". It also revealed that Kyle's struggle to live as the person he felt he was inside "has given him a determination to achieve his dreams and make his life a happy one that was worth the fight".

At the same time that Kyle's character was announced, Channel 4 soap opera Hollyoaks had already cast transgender actress Annie Wallace as Sally St. Claire, which was announced less than a day after Millington's casting announcement. Wallace revealed that the announcement of Kyle changed the announcement of her casting, explaining, "Hollyoaks originally wanted to just bring me in as a teacher and let people go, 'Is she trans or isn't she?', because I look a certain way and it's fine. But what happened was that EastEnders put out their big press release about Riley Millington. It was the week before my press release was about to be released, so our press office went, 'We better make sure people know about Annie as well'. We announced it within 24 hours of each other". As Sally debuted before Kyle, Wallace became the first transgender person to play a transgender character in a British soap opera.

Millington told Sarah Morris from The Independent that he had read about Treadwell-Collins's intention to introduce a transgender actor and character in an OK! magazine, which prompted him to write to the soap opera telling him that he was transgender and training to be an actor and at university, in addition to briefly outlining his transition. Millington then "completely forgot" about it, but that June he was invited to the EastEnders studio. Treadwell-Collins revealed that he knew from the first audition that Millington was the right actor for the role, explaining, "We saw Riley and we said that's him. One, because he was a brilliant actor. And two, there's a warmth in him that just comes through. I defy someone not to fall in love a little bit with Riley." Reflecting on the role in 2022, Carter Millington explained that he had initially lived a stealth life until he joined the soap, explaining, "When I got the role on EastEnders people knew, suddenly, who I was, my identity. They had those questions in their mind regarding my body. It was, at times, quite intrusive."

== Development ==
=== Introduction and family ===
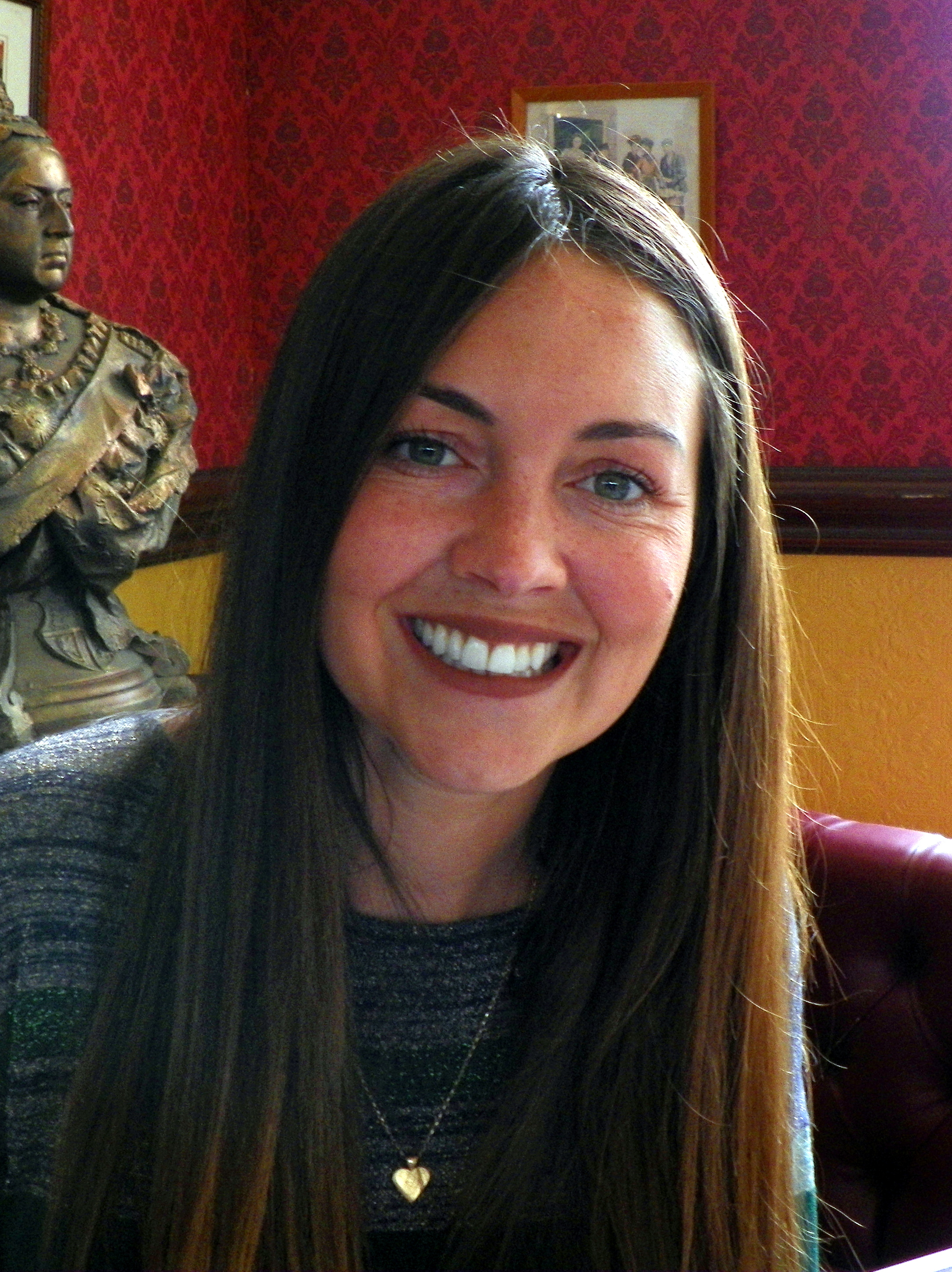
Lacey Turner portrays Stacey, Kyle's half-sister.

Kyle is introduced in mysterious circumstances and is connected to the mystery of Stacey Slater (Lacey Turner)'s secret key, which had been a mystery on EastEnders since March 2014. Kyle begins stalking and reveals to her that he is her paternal half-brother, but Stacey's dying great uncle, Charlie Slater (Derek Martin) says that Stacey's father, Brian Slater, only had daughters (in addition to Sean Slater (Robert Kazinsky)). However, EastEnders bosses confirmed that Kyle is Stacey's brother and was assigned female at birth. Kyle is thought to be Stacey's stalker and is blamed for the deterioration of her mental health. Kyle repeatedly tries to get Stacey to believe that they have the same father and tells her that she does need to be scared of him. He then comes out to her as transgender, revealing that he used to be called Sarah. Stacey is accepting of Kyle and they begin to bond, and Kyle later moves in with Stacey and her family. Kyle reveals to Stacey that his mother never accepted him as a man and he struggled to live as the person he had always felt he was on the inside.

In March 2016, it was announced that Denise Welch had been cast as Kyle's mother, Alison Slater, who would debut later that year for a short stint in an episode that would focus on the character. Welch was excited to join the soap and called the role "powerful", and it was reported that she had dyed her hair brown for the role. Welch's stint revealed Alison's struggle to accept her son's transition, and the episode dealt with "very sensitive issues" as Alison meets Kyle for the first time since he has transitioned. Welch had previously starred in the sitcom Boy Meets Girl and had spoken about how she was overjoyed that the show had helped people in the transgender community. In the episode, Stacey attempts to get Alison and Kyle to reconcile, but is unsuccessful. Alison is depicted as struggling to accept that Kyle is transgender and has transitioned. In the episode, Stacey invites Alison over and tries to get her to reconcile with her son, but her efforts backfire when Alison says she cannot accept her son as he is not her "Sarah" anymore, though she says that she is happy that he is not alone. Alison's firm refusal to spend more time getting to know Kyle leaves him "distraught and wishing she'd never visited at all", but Stacey suggests that there is hope as Alison had taken the flowers that Kyle bought for her. Alison's stint aired in Episode 5276, originally broadcast on 3 May 2016. Welch later said that she would not rule out a return as it was possible that Alison could come back if Kyle stayed on the soap. Months later, Alison (offscreen) acknowledges Kyle as a man.

Millington praised EastEnders fans for the "overwhelmingly positive" reception that they have given him and spoke about how his life had changed since joining the soap, commenting that it is "weird to have people following me around in shops!" Millington commented on how the role was increasing understanding about the transgender community; he told Radio Times that he had received a letter from a trans man telling him that he had been disowned by his mother, but they had known reconciled due to seeing the similar storyline regarding Kyle. Millington added that he was very happy being on EastEnders and that his character's story "has a lot to give". Millington revealed that people asked him if Kyle would get together with gay character Ben Mitchell (Harry Reid), commenting, "People think gender is the same as sexuality [...] but Kyle's not gay". Millington believed that it would be interesting to see Kyle dating women.

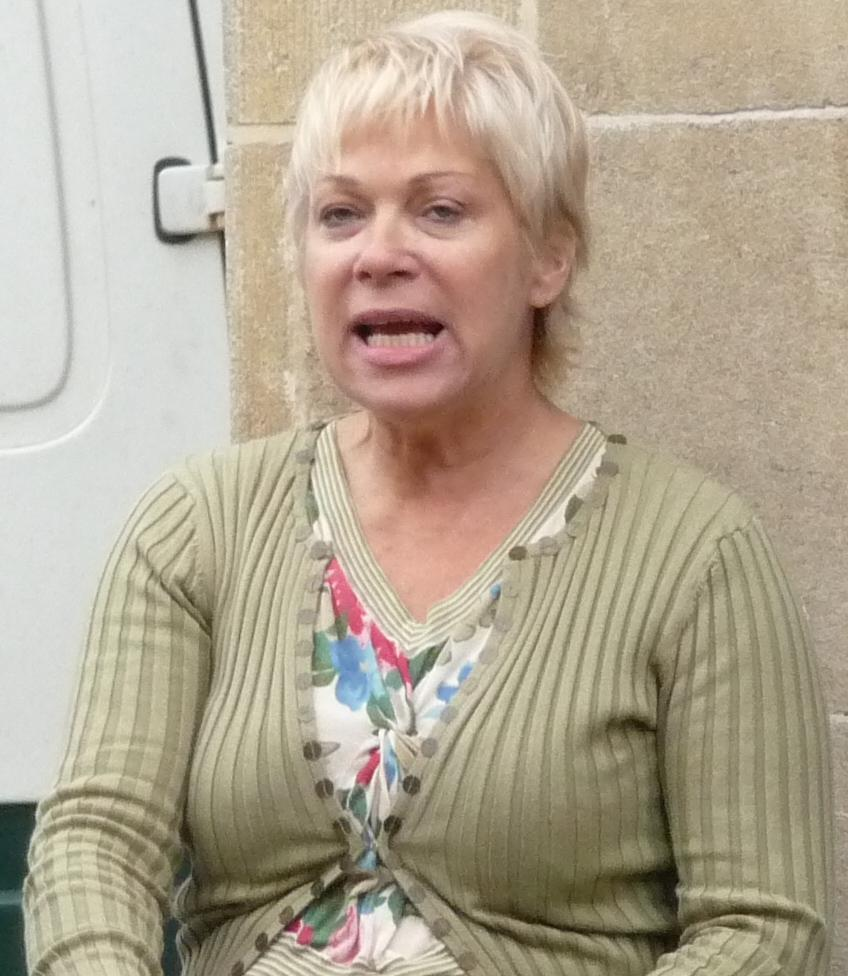
ActressDenise Welch was cast as Kyle's mother, Alison Slater.

Many of Kyle's storylines have revolved around his and Stacey's family connections. Kyle begins working as a chef for Ian Beale (Adam Woodyatt). Kyle's official BBC character profile revealed that Kyle's aspiration is to be a "top chef", having previously run the kitchen at Alison's Bed and breakfast in Blackpool. The profile revealed that kitchen is "Kyle's domain – he can express himself creatively and control his environment."

=== Andy and Steven's secrets ===
Another storyline involved Kyle in the mystery of new character Andy Flynn (Jack Derges) after Kyle finds a picture of Andy with Danielle Jones (Lauren Crace), who was close friends with Stacey before her death. Kyle finds "incriminating evidence" of Andy's "dark" secret – a folder full of pictures of Danielle and her mother, Ronnie Mitchell (Samantha Womack) – and asks later Andy about it, who snaps at Kyle and shuts him down, which takes Kyle aback. Kyle later reluctantly tells Ronnie about the concerning folders that he found of Danielle, which leads to Ronnie finding out Andy's true identity.

Kyle later finds out that Steven Beale (Aaron Sidwell) was behind the robbery at their restaurant when someone arrives to complain about the kitchen equipment that Steven had sold them. Kyle confronts Steven about it, who manages to buy his "silence" by sending Kyle off to an expensive cooking course with a celebrity chef. Life for Kyle becomes "unbearable" at his house due to overcrowding and financial issues and he becomes uncomfortable that Stacey is struggling to make ends meet, so he asks Steven for a pay rise. Steven rejects him due to his family's own financial difficulties, so Kyle "bites back" and blackmails him, implying that he reveal the truth about the robbery if Steven does not reconsider, leaving Steven "firmly on the back foot". Daniel Kilkelly from Digital Spy teased the storyline by writing "No more Mr Nice Guy..." and questioned whether Steven had met his match or if Kyle would be forced to back down.

=== Departure ===
"I will always be so grateful to the BBC for creating a landmark moment in history by casting me as the first trans actor to play a transgender role in UK soap history. It's pretty special, right? The BBC not only gave me a chance, and hope for my career, it provided the UK and the world a symbol of hope by representating more people from our diverse culture. It also opened up the possibilities for many others."

— Millington on his gratitude to the BBC (2022)

On 14 September 2016, it was announced that Millington would be departing EastEnders as Kyle, having been let go by new producer Sean O'Connor. Speaking about his exit, Millington said, "When I landed a 6 month contract at 'EastEnders' it was a dream come true. For that to be extended to a year was something I never expected. However, as the time comes for Kyle to depart Walford I am looking forward to taking on new roles and who knows, Kyle may find his way back to Walford one day." Kyle's exit was announced at the same time that a number of other characters were also announced to depart, including Ronnie Mitchell (Samantha Womack), Roxy Mitchell (Rita Simons), Pam Coker (Lin Blakley), Les Coker (Roger Sloman), Babe Smith (Annette Badland) and Claudette Hubbard (Ellen Thomas), among others. An EastEnders inside told Metro that "Kyle's storylines on the show came to a natural end for now", whilst an EastEnders spokesperson confirmed that Millington would be departing and wished him "all the best for the future". Kyle's exit storyline was not revealed, but it was expected that the door would remain "open" for the character to return. Duncan Lindsay from Metro teased that Kyle was "armed with the knowledge" of Steven being behind the robbery, but did not confirm if that would lead to his departure.

In Kyle's final months on the soap, he looks out for Stacey as she does her best to look out for her family. Kyle considers moving out when Martin's daughter, Bex Fowler (Jasmine Armfield), moves in and there is not enough room for everyone, but Stacey stops him as it is the "last thing she wants" and she decides to get a bigger house for them. Kyle is later offered a job abroad, but due to the household struggling financially, he tells Stacey that he will be turning it down. Due to Millington's departure, a writer from Soaplife speculated that Kyle would change his mind and questioned how Stacey's family would be able to afford the rent after his departure. Kyle cooks a lasagne for his family and then leaves for Marseille, France. Millington's last episode as Kyle aired on 25 November 2016.

In 2017, Millington criticised EastEnders for writing him out, and said that he was disappointed that Kyle was not shown as having a normal life. Millington added that Kyle "had the big coming-out story and it was dramatic and emotional, but we didn't get to see a happy ending, like a relationship of any sort other than the reunion with his half-sister, Stacey. It was frustrating". Millington felt that he had let himself and fans down for not "pushing" for something better, commenting that it a "shame to have gay characters and then you have to say goodbye". Millington also criticised creators for not expanding on Kyle's character after he came out.

== Storylines ==
Kyle arrives in Walford and watches Stacey Slater (Lacey Turner) from afar. He briefly attends her Halloween party, and when he leaves it is revealed that he has a similar key around his neck that Stacey used to have. Kyle sits behind Stacey at a Church service and she asks him if she knows him, but he leaves when she notices him. Stacey tells her boyfriend Martin Fowler (James Bye) and her mother Jean Slater (Gillian Wright) that she is being stalked, and Jean discloses that she was visited by someone. Jean eventually reveals that Stacey's father, Brian Slater, had another family, and Stacey realises that Kyle is her half-brother. Kyle tries to reveal himself to Stacey and comes to Walford with his close friends Sophie Dodd (Poppy Rush) and Ricksy Hicks (Joel Phillimore) as support. Kyle tells Stacey that he is her half-brother and they talk about their father. Kyle tells Stacey about his sisters, Siobhan and Shannon, and gives Stacey envelopes that were in Brian's safety deposit box for her and her brother Sean (Robert Kazinsky). Stacey realises that Kyle is the only one of Brian's children whose name does not begin with an S. They agree to stay in touch, and Kyle tells Sophie that he does not want Stacey to know his secret.

When Stacey has a mental breakdown, she runs away from Walford with her baby Arthur Fowler and calls Kyle, feeling he is the only one she can trust. Kyle takes Stacey to a café and calls Martin, who calls Kyle a fraud due to finding out that Brian only had daughters with his other family. When Martin tells Stacey that Kyle is not her brother, she believes that he is the Devil and runs away. Kyle is warned off by Martin and Kush Kazemi (Davood Ghadami). Kyle then returns at Charlie Slater's (Derek Martin) funeral, which causes Stacey to freak out and flee with Arthur. Kyle returns a month later to give Stacey a box from Brian's safety deposit box. Martin blames Kyle for Stacey's Postpartum psychosis and being sectioned and warns him away from Walford. Kyle later visits Stacey during her home visit and explains to her that he is transgender and used to be called Sarah. Stacey is accepting and allows Kyle to move in. Stacey arranges a lunch with Kyle and her family, where Kyle reveals that he is trans after Jean refuses to believe him. Stacey is angry at Jean for her prejudice towards Kyle. Kyle later gets a job as a chef in Ian Beale's (Adam Woodyatt) restaurant.

Kyle briefly feuds with Andy Flynn (Jack Derges) when he appears to be flirting with Stacey despite her engagement to Martin. Kyle tries to shake Andy off the ladder but stops after Stacey reminds him that that is how Brian died. Kyle is disappointed when Walford residents start to realise that he is trans but they are accepting. Stacey, having been told by Kyle that his mother, Alison Slater (Denise Welch), never accepted him as a man, invites Alison over and tries to get them to reconcile. Alison tells Kyle that she cannot accept him as he is not Sarah and leaves, though she tells him that she is glad that he is not alone. This devastates Kyle, but Stacey tells him that there is hope. Kyle is happy when Stacey and Martin get married. Kyle finds Andy's file filled with photos and newspaper clips of Ronnie Mitchell (Samantha Womack), and when he asks Andy he tells him that it is not his business.

The restaurant that Kyle is working at is robbed, and Kyle later finds out that Steven Beale (Aaron Sidwell) was behind the robbery when someone arrives to complain about the dodgy kitchen equipment Steven sold them. Kyle keeps quiet after Steven pays for Kyle to attend an expensive cooking course with a celebrity chef. The Slater household begins to get crowded and the bills become worse, so Kyle asks Steven for a pay rise. When Steven says no, Kyle threatens to tell the truth about the robbery. Following the cooking course, Kyle is featured in a magazine and is headhunted for a job in France. Kyle wants to take the job but does not want to worsen Stacey and Martin's financial problems. However, Stacey, Martin and Ian encourage Kyle to take the job and follow his dreams. Kyle's confidence is boosted when Alison phones him and calls him Kyle for the first time. Kyle then cooks a final time for his family and leaves.

== Reception ==
Following the news of Millington's casting, transgender actress Bethany Black, who had previously auditioned for EastEnders, praised the decision to introduce a transgender actor, saying, "It's about time we saw more trans roles on television. Being trans is like being gay was in the late 90s - it's a cool thing, so people are saying, 'Let's go and do this as a storyline'. As we progress we're going to see more of these roles. It's democratising the whole process." Transgender journalist and presenter Paris Lees also praised the decision to introduce Kyle, calling it the "biggest thing to happen" for the transgender community in Britain that decade. She added, "I didn't think Dominic Treadwell-Collins could top bringing Kathy back - but he's managed it! As a pop culture moment this is massive and a sign of the times."

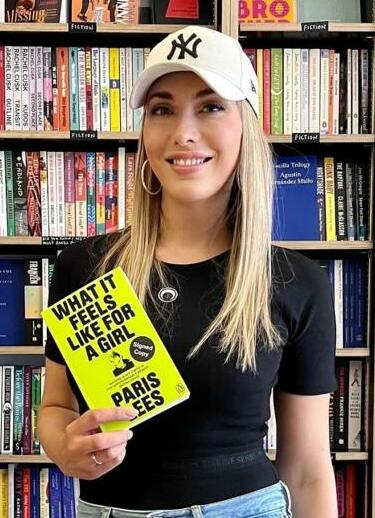
Paris Lee praised the decision to introduce a transgender actor on EastEnders

The reception was not all positive; Meka Beresford from PinkNews reported how the soap was "barraged with transphobic abuse" when Kyle's character was announced. The Yorkshire Post reported mocked the character by reporting the announcement of his character with the headline "It's a gender-bender EastEnder!" Responding to this, LGBT politician Lord Michael Cashman, who had appeared in EastEnders as Colin Russell and took part in the soap's first same sex kiss, told PinkNews, "The BBC's courage and determination in reflecting the world in which we live honestly is to be applauded. The negative headlines of 'gender bender' and the negative backlash on some aspects of social media, should encourage the BBC that they are doing absolutely the right thing to tackle homophobia and transphobia by showing the lives of people within our communities, who would otherwise be overlooked and misrepresented." The headline was later amended without mention of the original title.

For his role as Kyle, Millington was nominated for "Best Soap Newcomer" at the 2016 TV Choice awards. Kyle's debut was nominated for "LGBT+ Media moment" at the 2016 British LGBT Awards. For his role as Kyle, Millington was placed first on the 2015 Rainbow List, with Sarah Morrison writing "The 21-year-old is the first trans man to top the Rainbow List. After decades of directors arguing that there were not any transgender actors to cast in high-profile roles, Millington is proving them wrong. Our judges felt his decision to play the character Kyle in EastEnders could help trans people – even save lives – and represents a landmark cultural moment." Morrison also called the decision to introduce Kyle a "trailblazing move". Millington was also nominated for "Inspirational Role Model Of The Year" at the 2016 European Diversity Awards. Daniel Kilkelly from Digital Spy called Kyle "Stacey's kind-hearted" brother. He questioned whether Kyle would expose Steven and hoped that he would not make the same mistake that he did with Andy by not telling people for weeks. Kilkelly wrote "hurrah!" when it was suggested that Kyle would show his "no-nonsense Slater side" and called blackmailing Steven a "bold" move. The writer also described the scenes where Alison rejects Kyle as "tear-jerking" and "[h]eartbreaking", adding that whilst he knew that Alison would "cause a stir" in the soap, but her scenes "packed a real emotional punch" when she "harshly" rejected Kyle. Kilkelly also placed Millington on his list of the top 10 "rising stars" in British and Australian soap operas, writing:

"Let's be honest – after nearly two years of hype surrounding Stacey's mystery key, the 'big reveal' that it unlocked the secret of a long-lost brother could have been a real dud on paper. (To be honest, we were hoping it would somehow unlock a Sean Slater return – never mind!). But we'll forgive EastEnders for dragging out the secret, as the arrival of down-to-earth Kyle has been a welcome move for his on-screen family this year. With Kyle, Stacey, Martin, Lily and Belinda now a strong unit, there's a new family group on the Square that we can really root for. We also saw that new recruit Riley can excel in the emotional scenes too, when Kyle was rejected by his mum Alison for being transgender. Things have maybe been a little too quiet for Kyle since then, so let's hope he gets another chance to shine again soon."

A writer from BBC Bitesize included Kyle joining the soap as one of EastEnders's "Memorable LGBTQ moments" in its history, calling Kyle a "historic role" and a "landmark moment" for EastEnders. A writer from Irish Independent believed that "Transgender actors are beginning to make an impact on television", citing Millington, Rebecca Root and Annie Wallace. The Daily Mirror called Kyle a "mystery newbie" and reported how fans were "baffled" when Kyle told Stacey that he was her brother despite Charlie saying that Brian did not another son, with some questioning who Kyle was. Danny Walker from the same website called the scenes where Kyle comes as transgender to Stacey as "emotional" and reported how it had shocked some viewers, but also noted how some fans had already predicted it. Francescsa Battson from Closer Online reported how Kyle had "acclaim from fans and critics alike", particularly in the scenes with Alison. Battson also congratulated Millington for his TV Choice Awards nomination and wrote, "We've loved seeing Kyle's story develop since his arrival on Albert Square and can’t wait to see what else is in store for the character". Battson also noted how viewers had seen Kyle's "battle" for acceptance from some characters.

Speaking about the announcement of Kyle's exit, Rachel McGrath from HuffPost wrote that "mass exodus is continuing" and joked that "Albert Square is going to be pretty empty at this rate". A writer from Hello! reported how fans were left "baffled" and shocked by the news of Kyle's departure after the announcement of several other upcoming exits, with fans writing their shock and disappointment over the "countless" cast departures. The writer observed that there "must be something in the water" at EastEnders due to "yet another cast member" announcing their exit. Duncan Lindsay from Metro wrote that Kyle was introduced in "mysterious circumstances" but had since "put roots down in Albert Square". Lindsay reported how viewers had praised the episode which introduced Kyle's mother and that Millington had "won acclaim" from fans for his performance as Kyle on the soap. Angie Quinn from MyLondon wrote that despite building a relationship with Stacey, "life in Walford wasn't meant to be for Kyle" due to his departure. A writer from Soaplife worried that Kyle's exit could cause Stacey "a lot of grief" due to Stacey having come to depend on Kyle "for his cool head – and his hot stuff in the kitchen". Laura-Jayne Tyler from Inside Soap thought that it was a shame that Kyle would no longer be appearing. Áine Toner Women's Way from believed that Kyle "deserved better" in reference to his exit and Millington's 2017 comments over his disappointment over how the character was written out. In 2018, Kerry Barrett from Soaplife wrote about Kyle possibly returning, explaining that "Kyle left the Square just as we were getting to know him, but we liked him a lot", and suggested that Kyle could return with his sisters Shannon and Siobhan "in tow".

== See also ==
- List of LGBT characters in soap operas
- List of transgender characters in television
