= Lincoln Townley =

English painter (born 1972)

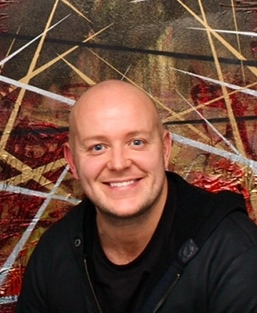
- Born: Lincoln Townley; 27 December 1972 (age 53); London, England
- Known for: PR, Contemporary art, painting
- Notable work: Hell collection, ICONS collection
- Movement: Outsider art
- Spouses: Beverley Scales (m. 1992; div. 2007); Denise Welch (m. 2013)
- Children: 1
- Website: lincolntownley.com

Lincoln Townley (born 27 December 1972) is an English self-taught painter who paints portraits of celebrities. He lives in Cheshire and in London.

== Career ==
Before turning to art as a career in his 40s, Townley was a celebrity publicist and PR manager. A significant collector of his work is David Sullivan.

From 2015 to 2017, Townley was artist in residence at Marriott Canary Wharf. Townley's work has been featured in the Sir Hugh Casson room of The Royal Academy of Arts in 2015 and 2016. He has been commissioned to paint the world's biggest icons by Mastercard and commissioned by The British Academy of Film and Television Arts Los Angeles to paint celebrities in 2016 and 2017. His painting of boxer Muhammad Ali sold for $623,000 in 2017.

== Personal life ==
Townley married Beverley Scales in 1992, with whom he has a son. He married actress Denise Welch in 2013. He appeared as her dancing partner on Stepping Out on ITV in 2013 shortly after their marriage.
