= List of Born and Bred episodes =

This is a list of episodes for the light-hearted British period drama Born and Bred, set in the 1950s. It aired from 21 April 2002 to 3 August 2005. There are 36 episodes in total: 35 in all 4 series including 1 Christmas special. Series 1, Series 2, the Christmas Special and Series 3 were shown on Sundays, while Series 4 was shown on Wednesdays.

Born and Bred cast members include: James Bolam (Dr. Arthur Gilder), Michael French (Dr. Tom Gilder), Jenna Russell (Deborah Gilder), Maggie Steed (Phyllis Woolf), John Henshaw (Wilf Bradshaw), Naomi Radcliffe (Jean Bradshaw), Charlotte Salt (Helen Gilder), Clive Swift (Rev. Eustacius Brewer), Samuel J. Hudson (Eddie Mills), Ross Little (Michael Gilder), Polly Thompson (Catherine Gilder), Peter Gunn (PC Lennard Cosgrove), Tracey Childs (Linda Cosgrove), Donald Gee (Horace Boynton), Richard Wilson (Dr. Donald Newman), Oliver Milburn (Dr. Nick Logan) and Kelly Harrison (Nancy Brisley).

== Series overview ==
Series	Episodes	Originally released	
Series	Episodes	First released	Last released
1	6	21 April 2002	26 May 2002
2	10	20 April 2003	29 June 2003
Special		21 December 2003	
3	9	29 February 2004	25 April 2004
4	10	1 June 2005	3 August 2005

== Episodes ==
=== Series 1 (2002) ===
Episode Number	Title	Airdate	Overview (Ratings)
1 (1-1)	"The Best Man"	21 April 2002	First ever episode. Dr Tom Gilder and his family leave Manchester to attend a wedding (7.27m)
2 (1-2)	"Nothing Like the Son"	28 April 2002	Edie has a heart condition (7.96m)
3 (1-3)	"The Inspector Calls"	5 May 2002	The villagers rally around to get the cottage hospital up to scratch before the NHS inspector arrives (6.98m)
4 (1-4)	"Buried Treasure"	12 May 2002	Tom is puzzled by carpenter Bert Cartwright and Annie, Bert’s wife falls ill. Meanwhile, Wilf finds an unexploded World War II bomb (7.53m)
5 (1-5)	"Brother in Arms"	19 May 2002	Len Cosgrove’s brother Frank injures himself while riding a train (8.28m)
6 (1-6)	"Judgement Day"	26 May 2002	Neville Manley, the NHS inspector declares the cottage hospital annexe to Rattenbury General (7.51m)

=== Series 2 (2003) ===
Episode Number	Title	Airdate	Overview (Ratings)
7 (2-1)	"Lost Souls"	20 April 2003	Alec suffers a heart attack (5.88m)
8 (2-2)	"Home to Roost"	27 April 2003	Deborah’s mother Dora arrives unannounced (6.57m)
9 (2-3)	"Blood Relations"	11 May 2003	Eddie’s uncle, Fred, the drayman, suffers from severe leukaemia (6.27m)
10 (2-4)	"Fertility Rites"	18 May 2003	Edie McClure’s eldest daughter Joanne announces pregnancy and the water supplies run dry (6.45m)
11 (2-5)	"His Brother's Keeper"	25 May 2003	German Hans Gothard comes to Ormston to tell Wilf about the war and Arthur injures his ankle (6.46m)
12 (2-6)	"Old Flames"	1 June 2003	Deborah’s mother Dora and her groom Derek arrive in Ormston for the wedding (6.94m)
13 (2-7)	"The Miracle of Ormston"	8 June 2003	Amy Faulkner’s wheelchair-using son, Stuart contracts tuberculosis (6.94m)
14 (2-8)	"The Magnificent Colin"	15 June 2003	A fortune-teller comes to Ormston (5.88m)
15 (2-9)	"The Last Hurrah (Part 1)"	22 June 2003	Tory MP Eugenia Maddox arrives to inspect the hospital (6.59m)
16 (2-10)	"The Last Hurrah (Part 2)"	29 June 2003	Wilf and Jean deliver a batch of pies to the hospital (6.16m)

=== Christmas Special (2003) ===
Episode Number	Title	Airdate	Overview (Ratings)
17 (CS)	"A Very Ormston Christmas"	21 December 2003	The villagers celebrate Christmas (6.17m)

=== Series 3 (2004) ===
Episode Number	Title	Airdate	Overview (Ratings)
18 (3-1)	"A Little Touch of Harry"	29 February 2004	Deborah’s cousin Pearl gives birth to a baby (6.61m)
19 (3-2)	"No Regrets"	7 March 2004	Radio producer Clifton George is auditioning a role of Tiny Terry for a children’s hour programme and Helen starts work as a nurse (5.96m)
20 (3-3)	"A Small Flourish"	14 March 2004	Dennis Tyldesley’s arrival causes jealously from shoemaker Herbert Gough (6.70m)
21 (3-4)	"Thick as Thieves"	21 March 2004	Linda and Len become foster parents (6.11m)
22 (3-5)	"The Doctor Now Departing"	28 March 2004	Arthur decides to leave Ormston for good to take a new life in New Zealand (6.28m)
23 (3-6)	"And Is There Honey Still for Tea?"	4 April 2004	A new doctor, Donald Newman, arrives in the village (6.03m)
24 (3-7)	"More Than You Know"	11 April 2004	An emergency crisis meeting is held about a construction of a new road to be built in a village (5.18m)
25 (3-8)	"A House Divided"	18 April 2004	The inter-village pub games take place when Ormston competes with Thursvale (6.42m)
26 (3-9)	"Something Old"	25 April 2004	Despite the setbacks, Jean and Eddie finally get married in the end (6.30m)

=== Series 4 (2005) ===
Episode Number	Title	Airdate	Overview (Ratings)
27 (4-1)	"The Great Leap Forward"	1 June 2005	A new doctor, Nick Logan, arrives in the village to set up a blood donor bank and the news of Tom’s death is announced to the Gilders (4.70m)
28 (4-2)	"Flying Home"	8 June 2005	Helen and her family pay their last respects to Tom (Out of the Top 30)
29 (4-3)	"Community Spirits"	15 June 2005	Deborah’s sister, Nancy Brisley arrives in the village (3.94m)
30 (4-4)	"Never Seek to Tell"	22 June 2005	The Cosgroves prepare for the latest foster child Laura (Out of the Top 30)
31 (4-5)	"Apple Day"	29 June 2005	The apple day festival takes place (3.95m)
32 (4-6)	"The Milk of Human Kindness"	6 July 2005	Deborah arranges a lunch date with Nancy (4.20m)
33 (4-7)	"Love Is Where It Falls"	13 July 2005	Nancy and Wilf decide to change jobs (Out of the Top 30)
34 (4-8)	"The Element of Surprise"	20 July 2005	Jean invites Ruby to the Ormston Antiques Fair (3.95m)
35 (4-9)	"A Wrathful God"	27 July 2005	A local home for disadvantaged persons is forced to close down for good (3.95m)
36 (4-10)	"Someone to Watch Over Me"	3 August 2005	Last ever episode. Jean suffers from stomach pains and in the end, Wilf is arrested by the police for stealing a church chalice (3.84m)
