= Yakety Yak (disambiguation) =

"Yakety Yak" is a song written by Jerry Leiber and Mike Stoller and originally performed by the Coasters in 1958.

Yakety Yak (or similar phrases) may also refer to:

- Yakety Yak, Take It Back, a 1991 music video using a recycling-themed version of the song
- Yakkety Yak, the name of version 16.10 of the Ubuntu operating system

== See also ==
- "Yakety Sax", a pop jazz instrumental
- Yackety Yack, an Australian film
- Yackety Yak, a yearbook at the University of North Carolina at Chapel Hill
- Yakkity Yak, a Nickelodeon/Cartoon Network (Canada) animated television series
