= Riley Carter Millington =

English actor

- Born: 1993 or 1994 (age 32–33); Stretford, Greater Manchester, England
- Occupation: Actor
- Years active: 2015–present
- Known for: Portraying Kyle Slater in EastEnders (2015–2016), first transgender man to play a transgender character in British soap history

Riley Carter Millington (born June 1994) is an English actor known for playing Kyle Slater in the BBC soap opera EastEnders in 2015–2016. He was the first trans man to play a regular transgender character in British soap history. The Independent on Sunday, in its 2015 "Rainbow List", named Millington the most influential LGBTI person in the UK, making him the first trans man to top the list. The judges stated him playing Kyle "could help trans people – even save lives – and represents a landmark cultural moment."

In January 2017, Millington appeared in TLC's Celebrity Fat Fighters series. He lost 279 stone during this process.

In 2018, marking 100 years of the end of World War One, Millington appeared as Evans in the stage adaptation by of Birdsong, a novel written by Sebastian Faulks, travelling the length and breadth of the UK with Mesh Theatre Company.

Riley appeared in the 2022 channel 4 prison drama series 'screw', playing prisoner Troy Walker; before also reappearing again for series 2 in 2023.

== Early life ==
Millington, from Stretford, studied drama at Eccles Sixth Form Centre and on the BA (Hons) Acting at the University of Central Lancashire before being cast in EastEnders. His character, Kyle, is also transgender. Millington's casting was praised by presenter Paris Lees as "the biggest thing to happen for the transgender community in Britain this decade. ... As a pop culture moment, this is massive and a sign of the times."

== Personal life ==
Millington has been engaged to Carlene Holton since 2018.

== Filmography ==
=== Television ===
Date	Show	Role
2015–2016	EastEnders	Kyle Slater
2022–2023	Screw	Troy Walker
