= Jack Derges =

British actor

- Occupation: Actor
- Years active: 2007–present
- Television: EastEnders; Doctors
- Spouse: Yasmin Alamiri (m. 2023)
- Children: 2

Jack Derges is a British actor known for playing Andy Flynn in the BBC soap opera EastEnders.

== Career ==
Derges made his acting debut in the 2007 Casualty episode "Core Values" as Private Haydon; he returned to the show in 2012 as Ben Shears in the episode "Desperate Remedies". Also, in 2012, Derges appeared in the TV-movie Dungeons & Dragons 3: The Book of Vile Darkness as Grayson and in the first episode of television series Switch, as Miles. In 2013, he appeared in WPC 56 as Bill Pearson and Holby City, for one episode, as Mark Christiansen. He also appeared in the horror film Freak of Nurture, as Jed Warner. In 2015, he appeared in Cucumber as Louis Barman, during the first episode; as a character named only as Energy Drink Vendor, for one episode, in Episodes; as Roger, for one episode, in Crims; as Andy, for one episode, in The Royals and as Simon, for six episodes, in Humans.

Derges made his debut appearance in the BBC soap opera EastEnders as Andy Flynn on 17 March 2016, appearing in 35 episodes and leaving at the conclusion of the storyline. His character's last episode aired on 8 August 2016. In September 2018 he made a further guest appearance in Casualty, as Alan "Al" Marsh. In 2019, he appeared in the BBC medical soap opera Doctors, in the recurring role of Enzo D'Agostino. He appeared again in May 2023, this time in the role of Paul Lewis.

== Filmography ==
Film
| Year | Title | Role |
|---|---|---|
| 2012 | Dungeons & Dragons 3: The Book of Vile Darkness | Grayson |
| 2015 | Freak of Nurture | Jed Warner |
| 2017 | 400 Boys | DK |

Television
| Year | Title | Role | Notes |
|---|---|---|---|
| 2007 | Casualty | Private Haydon | Series 22, Episode 6: "Core Values" |
| 2009 | Skins | Mike | Series 3, Episode 5 |
| 2012 | Switch | Miles | Series 1, Episode 1 |
| 2012 | Casualty | Ben Shears | Series 26, Episode 32: "Desperate Remedies" |
| 2013 | WPC 56 | Bill Pearson | 4 episodes |
| 2014 | Holby City | Mark Christiansen | Series 16, Episode 43: "Affair of the Mind" |
| 2015 | Cucumber | Louis Barman | Series 1, Episode 1 |
| 2015 | Episodes | Energy Drink Vendor | Series 1, Episode 3 |
| 2015 | Crims | Roger | Series 1, Episode 5: "Day Eighty-Nine" |
| 2015 | The Royals | Andy Sinclair | Series 1, Episode 2: "Infants of the Spring" |
| 2015 | Humans | Simon | 7 episodes |
| 2016 | EastEnders | Andy Flynn | Series regular; 35 episodes |
| 2018 | Casualty | Alan Marsh | Series 33, Episode 4 |
| 2019 | Doctors | Enzo D'Agostino | Recurring role |
| 2020 | Get Even | Coach Creed | Recurring role |
| 2020 | In Search of Dracula | Narrator | One off documentary |
| 2023 | Doctors | Paul Lewis | Episode: "The Value of Nothing" |

Video games
| Year | Title | Role |
|---|---|---|
| 2017 | Need for Speed: Payback | Tyler Morgan |

== Stage ==
| Year | Title | Role | Notes |
|---|---|---|---|
| 2016 | The Boys in the Band | Cowboy | Park Theatre, London |
| 2021 | Adventurous | Jake | Online only presentation through Jermyn Street Theatre |

== Awards and nominations ==
| Year | Award | Category | Result | Ref. |
|---|---|---|---|---|
| 2016 | Inside Soap Awards | Best Bad Boy | Nominated | |
