= Born and Bred =

- Genre: Drama
- Created by: Chris Chibnall; Nigel McCrery
- Starring: James Bolam; Michael French; Richard Wilson; Jenna Russell; Maggie Steed; Clive Swift; John Henshaw; Naomi Radcliffe; Charlotte Salt; Oliver Milburn; Kelly Harrison; Donald Gee; Ross Little; Polly Thompson
- Theme music composer: Jim Parker
- Country of origin: United Kingdom
- Original language: English
- No. of series: 4 (inc. Christmas Special)
- No. of episodes: 36 (list of episodes)

Production
- Running time: 60 minutes
- Production company: BBC Television

Original release
- Network: BBC One
- Release: 21 April 2002 – 3 August 2005

Born and Bred is a British light-hearted 1950s-set medical drama series aired on BBC One which ran from 21 April 2002 to 3 August 2005. It was created by Chris Chibnall and Nigel McCrery. Initially the cast was led by James Bolam and Michael French as a father and son who run a cottage hospital in Ormston, a fictitious village in Lancashire, in the 1950s. Bolam's and French's characters were later replaced by characters played by Richard Wilson and Oliver Milburn.

== Cast ==
- James Bolam as Dr Arthur Gilder (series 1 to 3)
- Michael French as Dr Tom Gilder (series 1 to 3)
- Jenna Russell as Deborah Gilder, who chairs the parish council
- Charlotte Salt as Helen Gilder
- Ross Little as Michael Gilder
- Polly Thompson as Catherine Gilder
- Cameron and Jacub Earley (2002–03) and Evan Fortescue (2003–05) as Philip "Pip" Gilder
- Peter Gunn as Constable Len Cosgrove
- Tracey Childs as Nurse Linda Cosgrove
- Maggie Steed as Phyllis Woolf
- John Henshaw as Wilf Bradshaw
- Naomi Radcliffe as Jean Bradshaw (later Mills)
- Samuel J. Hudson as Eddie Mills
- Donald Gee as Horace Boynton
- Clive Swift as the Reverend Eustacius Brewer
- Shirley White and Joan Worswick as the Matthews Sisters
- Richard Wilson as Dr Donald Newman (series 3 to 4)
- Oliver Milburn as Dr Nick Logan (series 4)
- Kelly Harrison as Nancy Brisley (series 4)

== Plot ==
Born and Bred is set in the fictitious village of Ormston in Lancashire during the 1950s. The lead characters are Dr Arthur Gilder and his son Tom, who together run the cottage hospital under the National Health Service. Tom is married to Deborah, who is chairwoman of the parish council, and they have four children, Helen, Michael, Catherine and Philip. The hospital's nurse is Linda Cosgrove, who is married to the village policeman, PC Len Cosgrove. The local pub is run by Phyllis Woolf and the village shop by Horace Boynton. Other characters include the station master, Wilf Bradshaw; his daughter, Jean, who owns a scrapyard and later marries Eddie Mills, a mechanic; and the vicar, the Reverend Eustacius Brewer. Arthur and Tom depart in the third series, and are replaced by Dr Donald Newman in the episode "And Is There Still Honey For Tea?" and Dr Nick Logan in "The Great Leap Forward", plus Nancy Brisley, Deborah's sister.

== Episodes ==
Born and Bred first aired on 21 April 2002. After 4 series, 1 Christmas special and 36 regular episodes it ended on 3 August 2005. Each episode is 60 minutes long and aired on BBC One at 8 pm on Sunday. Series 1, Series 2, Series 3 and the Christmas Special were shown on Sundays, while Series 4 was shown on Wednesdays. ITV3 began broadcasting Born and Bred from April 2010. It was being broadcast on ITV3 and is currently being shown on the UK Free to Air TV Channel "True Entertainment". The series aired in Australia on 7TWO late 2011, Weekdays at 1:15pm and on UKTV Drama in July/August 2023.

== Locations ==
The exterior shots of the early series were filmed primarily in and around East Lancashire, mainly in the village of Downham, but some scenes were shot in Helmshore and others in Settle, North Yorkshire. Two railway scenes were filmed on the East Lancashire Railway, but the main railway scenes were shot on the Keighley and Worth Valley Railway. Antique shop scene is in Rawtenstall, Lancashire.

== Home releases ==
In March 2012, the entire series was re-released on DVD in the UK (Region 2) by Acorn Media UK.
